= Karl Pommerhanz =

Austrian caricaturist and comics artist (1857–1940)

Karl Pommerhanz (June 6, 1857 – c. 1940) was an Austrian cartoonist specializing in gag strips consisting of four to eight panels.

Pommerhanz studied in Prague from 1878 to 1886, where he worked as a painter. In the 1886 he moved to Munich and began to draw for the Fliegende Blätter, a German satirical magazine. In 1895 he began working for the Meggendorfer Blätter, another satirical magazine, published by fellow cartoonist and colleague from the Fliegende Blätter, Lothar Meggendorfer.

In 1906 the Chicago Tribune decided to publish a Sunday supplement in German, drafted by German draftsmen, for the large ethnic German population in Chicago at that time. Pommerhanz, along with Meggendorfer and another artist, Lyonel Feininger were chosen to participate in this experiment.

It ultimately proved unsuccessful and the supplement stopped production after only a few weeks. As a result, Pommerhanz returned to drawing for the Meggendorfer Blätter, along with other German magazines, Flips, Der gute Kamerad, and Blaubandwoche. Not much is known about him past 1930, but he is generally accepted as dying in Munich in 1940.

== Selected works ==
- Die „Herren“ Buben. Eßlingen / Munich 1902.
- O diese Buben! Enßlin & Laiblin, Reutlingen 1920.
- Pommerhanz Album. Enßlin & Laiblin, Reutlingen 1921.
- Rob und Bert. Text: Wilhelm Widmann. Leipziger Graph. Werke, Leipzig 1925.
- O diese Jugend. Enßlin & Laiblin, Reutlingen 1925.
- Ruckels Abenteuer. A. Bergmann, Leipzig 1927.
- O diese Mädchen. Enßlin & Laiblin, Reutlingen 1929.
- Wilde Buben und Mädel. Enßlin & Laiblin, Reutlingen 1930.
- O diese Bösen. Enßlin & Laiblin, Reutlingen 1962.
