= Meggendorfer =

Meggendorfer is a German surname. Notable people with the surname include:

- Friedrich Meggendorfer (1880–1953), German psychiatrist and neurologist
- Lothar Meggendorfer (1847–1925), German illustrator and cartoonist

== See also ==
- Meggendorfer-Blätter
