= Privatdozent =

Academic title at European universities

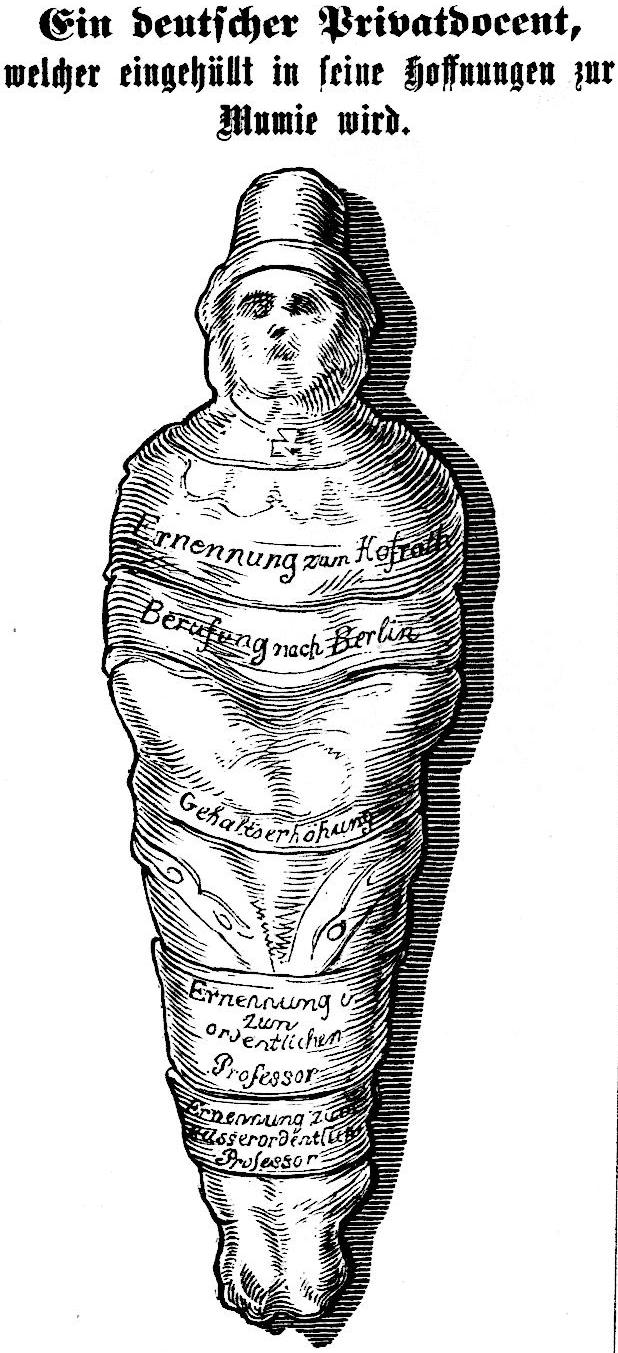
Caricature of a Privatdozent from German satirical periodical Fliegende Blätter (1848): "A German Privatdozent who, wrapped up in his hopes, turns into a mummy."

Privatdozent (for men) or Privatdozentin (for women), abbreviated PD, P.D. or Priv.-Doz., is an academic title conferred at some European universities, especially in German-speaking countries, to someone who holds certain formal qualifications that denote an ability (facultas docendi) and permission to teach (venia legendi) a designated subject at the highest level. To be granted the title Priv.-Doz. by a university, a recipient has to fulfill the criteria set by the university which usually require excellence in research, teaching, and further education.

In its modern usage, the title indicates that the holder has completed their habilitation and is therefore granted permission to teach and examine students independently without having a full professorship (chair). With respect to the level of academic achievement, the title of Privatdozent is comparable to that of an Associate Professor (United States), Senior Lecturer (United Kingdom), or maître de conférences détenteur de l'habilitation à diriger des recherches (HDR) (France). However, unlike the Associate Professors in North America, PD titles are not always linked to tenured academic positions and do not always imply the role of a Principal Investigator.

== Conferment and roles ==
A university faculty can confer the title to an academic who has a higher doctoral degree—usually in the form of a habilitation. The title, Privatdozent, as such does not imply a salaried appointment; it merely denotes permission to teach and examine independently at the conferring faculty without a professorial appointment. At German universities, some title holders are appointed as Senior Researchers or Dozent (either on a fee basis or as tenured academic employees), while others are solely supported by externally funded research projects.

Even though many title holders are not employed by the university and do not have remuneration agreements with their conferring institution, depending on local regulations, they may be required to teach in order to maintain their status as Privatdozent. In 2012 more than 5,000 honorarium Privatdozenten worked at German universities without a salary. A Privatdozent ceases to hold the title if appointed at professorial level or if discontinuing lecturing at the faculty. In Germany, the title can be revoked if the holder does not lecture for more than two consecutive semesters.

== History ==
The title has its origins in German-speaking countries in Europe before 1800. It referred to a lecturer who received fees from his students rather than a university salary.

In Prussia it started around 1810, and became established around 1860. From 1900 until 1968, most university professors who were appointed were title holders, as they obtained a habilitation and already held a teaching position.

Since the end of the 1960s, the requirement of a post-doctoral degree for a professorship in Germany has been questioned and in some cases is not necessary. In 2002, junior professorships were introduced, providing a route to a professorship without habilitation; the habilitation is no longer the gold standard against which other qualifications are measured during the appointment process. This has led to a decline in universities conferring the title Privatdozent in certain academic disciplines.
