= Franziska Schlopsnies =

German fashion, poster and graphic designer

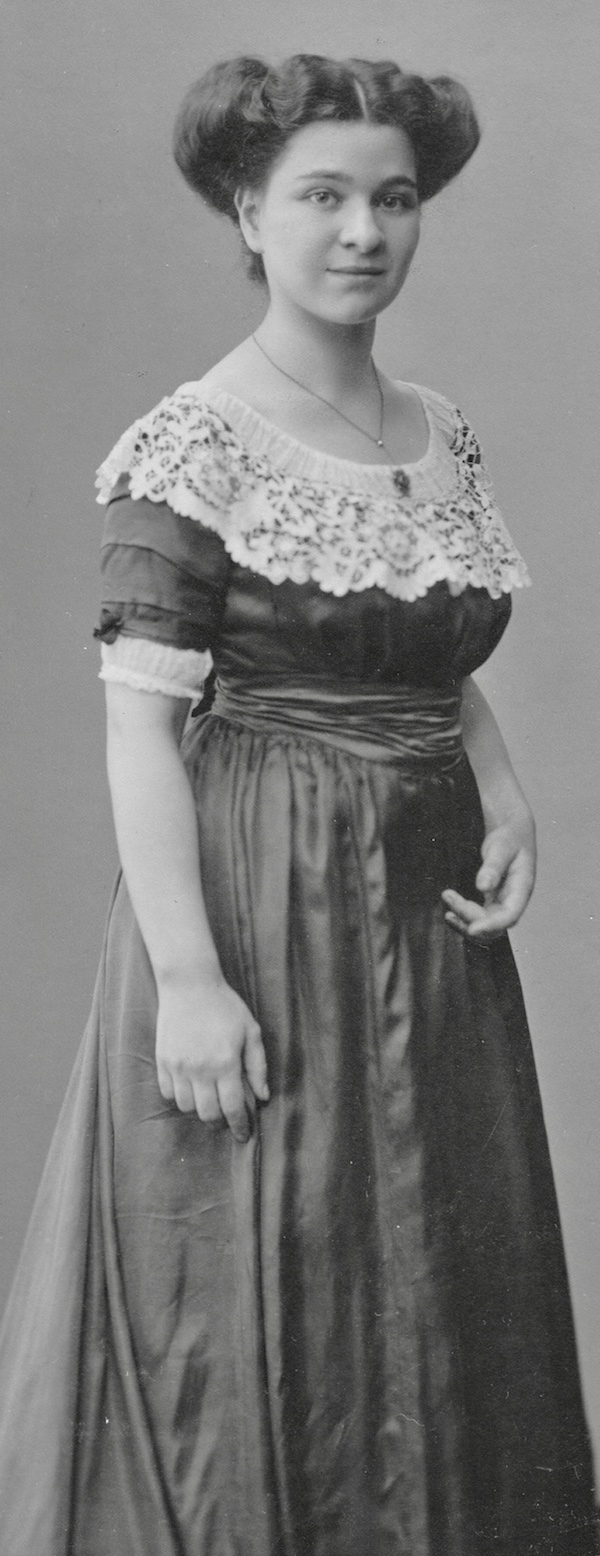
Franziska Schlopsnies (1910)

Franziska Schlopsnies, born Spangenthal (born on 1 December 1884 in Frankfurt am Main; died on 30 December 1944 in Auschwitz concentration camp) was a German fashion, poster and graphic designer. In the 1920s, her Art Deco illustrations and covers appeared in, among others, the weeklies Jugend, Simplicissimus, Meggendorfer-Blätter, and Berliner Illustrirte Zeitung.

== Biography ==
Franziska Spangenthal was born in Frankfurt am Main as the eldest of three daughters of the Jewish merchant Robert Spangenthal and his wife Henriette Klein. Her father was a wholesaler of chemical products and machine oils. Shortly after the death of her father in 1905, she met painter, puppet-maker and caricaturist Albert Schlopsnies. The son of a Protestant landowner from East Prussia, he studied at the Munich Art Academy with Gabriel von Hackl from 1903. On 15 September 1910 in Frankfurt Franziska married Albert, who was by then employed as a freelancer at Margarete Steiff GmbH, for which he designed catalogs and numerous dolls and stuffed animals. In 1913, Franziska and Albert moved to Munich and settled in the Schwabing district. In May 1915 their daughter Irmgard Erika was born.

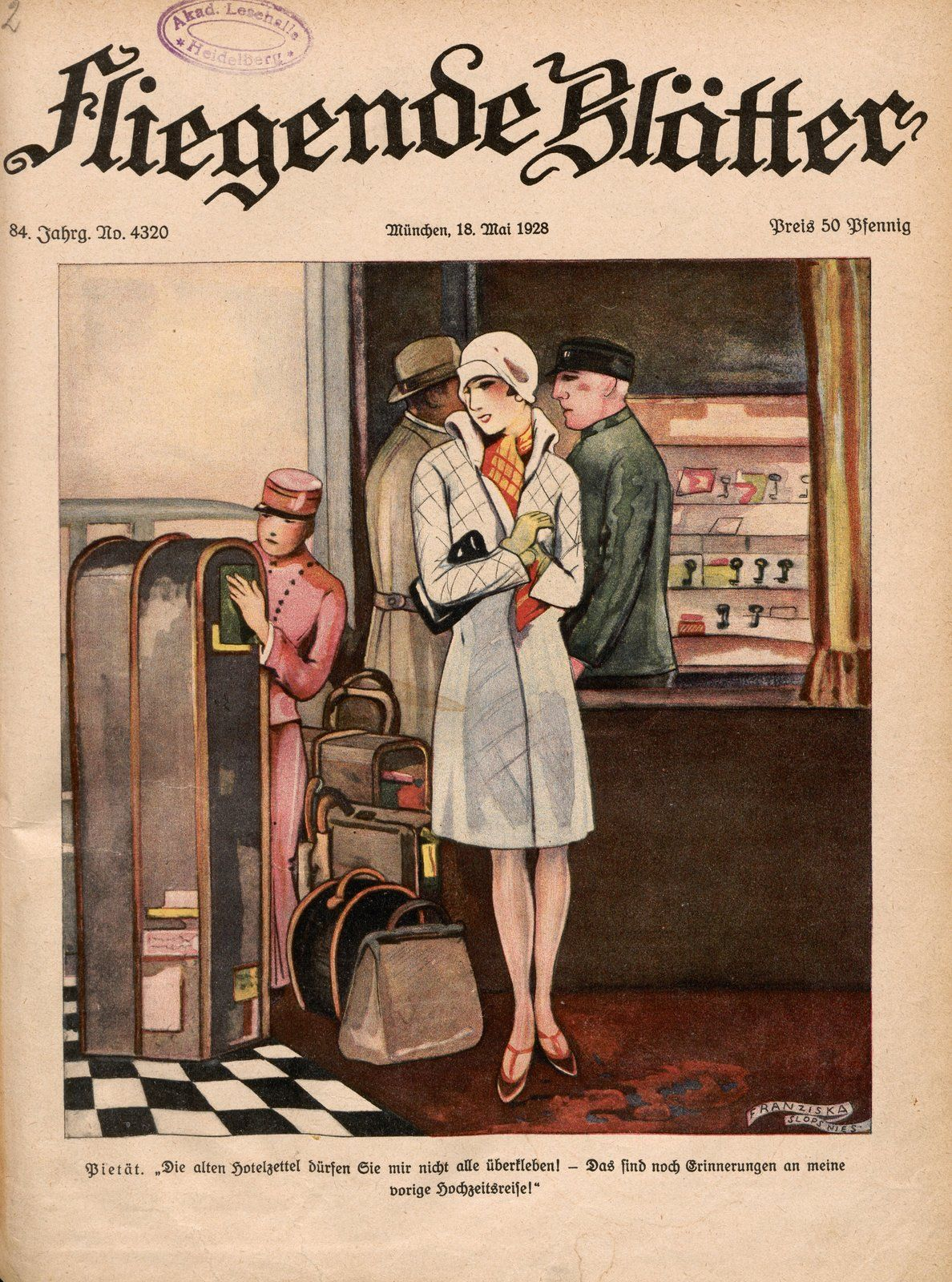
Piety : Cover of Fliegende Blätter of 18 May 1928

After World War I, Franziska Schlopsnies began designing posters for fashion shows, department stores and exhibitions. One of her earliest surviving designs was made in 1920 for the Tietz department store. After the couple's divorce on 18 December 1922 she often signed her designs with the name "Slopsnies". From the mid-1920s, she preferred to draw figurines and costumes. Along with Doris Buscher, Liliane and Margaret von Suttner she was considered among the most important fashion illustrators. Her Art Deco-inspired fashion drawings and caricatures were regularly published in magazines, such as Jugend, Simplicissimus, Eleganten Welt, Berliner Illustrirten Zeitung, Sport im Bild and the monthly Velhagen & Klasings Monatshefte. For the satirical periodicals Fliegende Blätter and Meggendorfer-Blätter, she designed numerous covers in the second half of the 1920s.

After Adolf Hitler's rise to power, she produced no known published drawings. To secure her livelihood and that of her daughter, she rented some rooms in her apartment to students. Both her sisters and her mother succeeded in emigrating, while Franziska could have been at first spared deportation because she was the mother of a daughter who, by the definition of the National Socialists, was a "Mischling [person of Jewish mixed race] of the first degree". Regarding the date of her deportation, the record is contradictory. She was deported in 1943 or January 1944 with an unknown destination. On 30 December 1944 Franziska Schlopsnies died in the concentration camp Auschwitz. Her daughter Erika survived World War II and emigrated to the United States in 1946.

== Selection of works ==
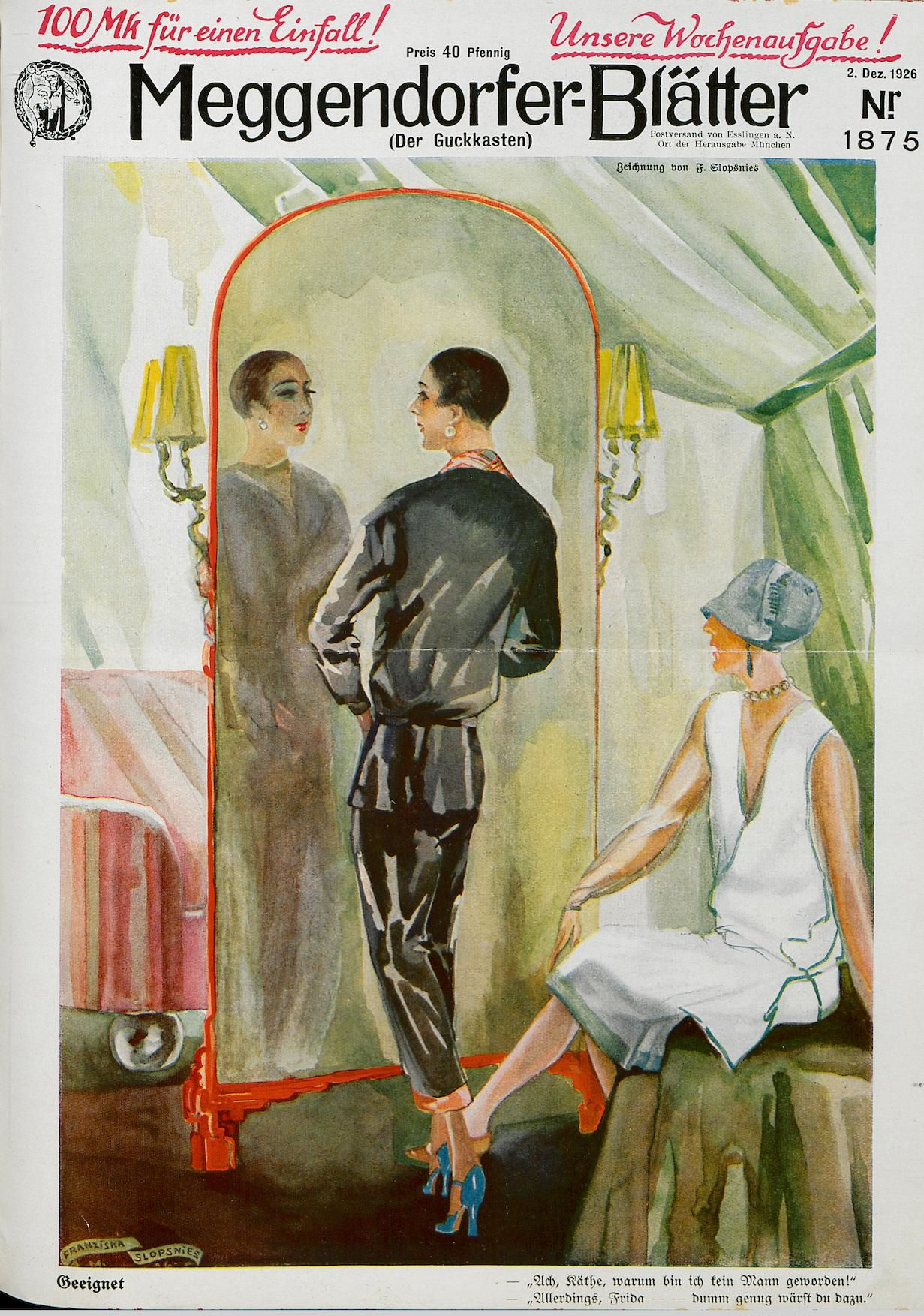
Geeignet – Cover of Meggendorfer-Blätter of 2 December 1926

- Advertisement for a fashion show in Hause Tietz, 1920
- Advertisement for Schirm Schönherr, Theatinerstraße; München 1923
- Advertisement for the exhibition Der gedeckte Tisch, München 1926
- Advertisement for the company Andreas Kaut
- Advertisement for the company Gebr. E & J Marx, München
- Die modische Linie, 1923 (Jugend Heft 22)
- An der Riviera, 1926, (Jugend Heft 36)
- Geeignet, 1926 (Meggendorfer-Blätter Nr. 1875)
- Offenherzig – Elegantes Paar im Gespräch über den Wert der Zeit des Mannes, 1927 (Meggendorfer-Blätter Nr. 1895)
- Die Spanierin, 1926 (Velhagen & Klasings Monatshefte Nr. 41 6), 1928 (Illustrirte Zeitung Nr. 4347-4359)
- Der Geschiedene, 1927 (Meggendorfer-Blätter Nr. 1890)
- Vor dem Spiegel, 1927 (Sport im Bild 1927 Nr. 2)
- Kühl, 1927, (Fliegende Blätter Nr. 4278)
- Pietät, 1928 (Fliegende Blätter Nr. 4320)
- Die prüde Gattin, 1928 (Fliegende Blätter Nr. 4328)
- Paradox, 1928 (Fliegende Blätter Nr. 4335)
- Paar beim Spaziergang mit Hund, 1928 (Fliegende Blätter. Nr. 4368)
- Fasching der eleganten Welt: auf dem Ball Pare im Deutschen Theater zu München, 1928, (Illustrirte Zeitung Nr. 4323)
- Argument, 1929 (Fliegende Blätter Nr. 4367)
- Der Tag fängt an, 1929, (Fliegende Blätter Nr. 4375)
- Eben wollt ich 'nen Kuss, Thea, 1929, (Fliegende Blätter Nr. 4379)
- Aber Meta..- mit diesen Launen quälst du dich und mich, 1931, (Fliegende Blätter Nr. 4493)
- Diese Segler sind mir zu dreist, 1932, (Fliegende Blätter Nr. 4528)
- Große Wirkungen, 1932, (Fliegende Blätter Nr. 4551)
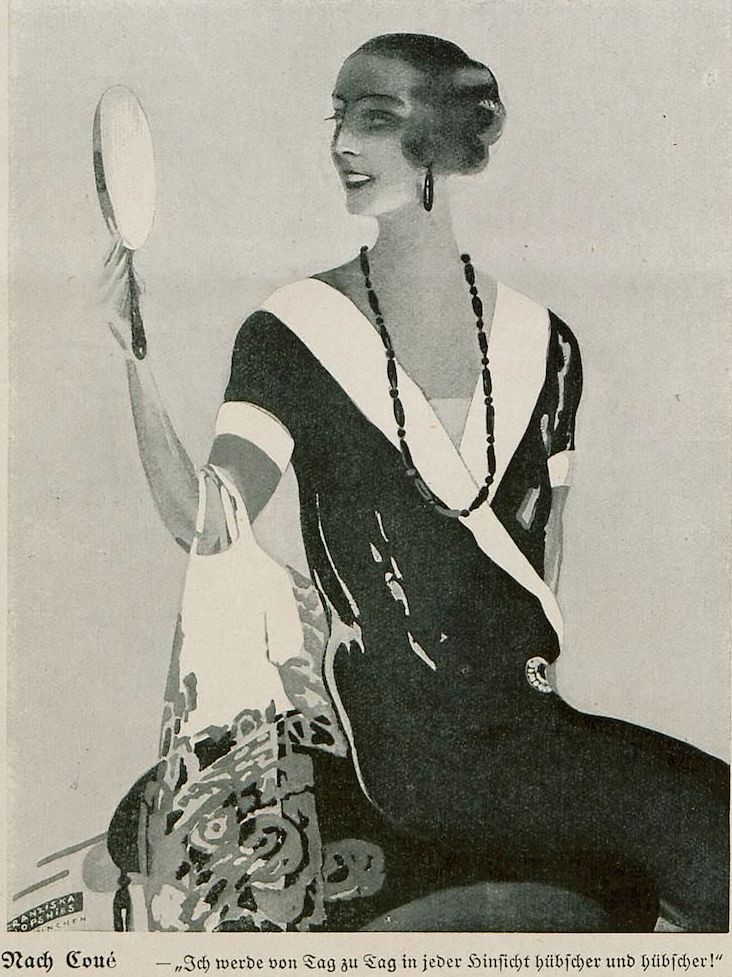
Nach Coué — "Ich werde von Tag zu Tag in jeder hinsicht hübscher und hübscher." 1922

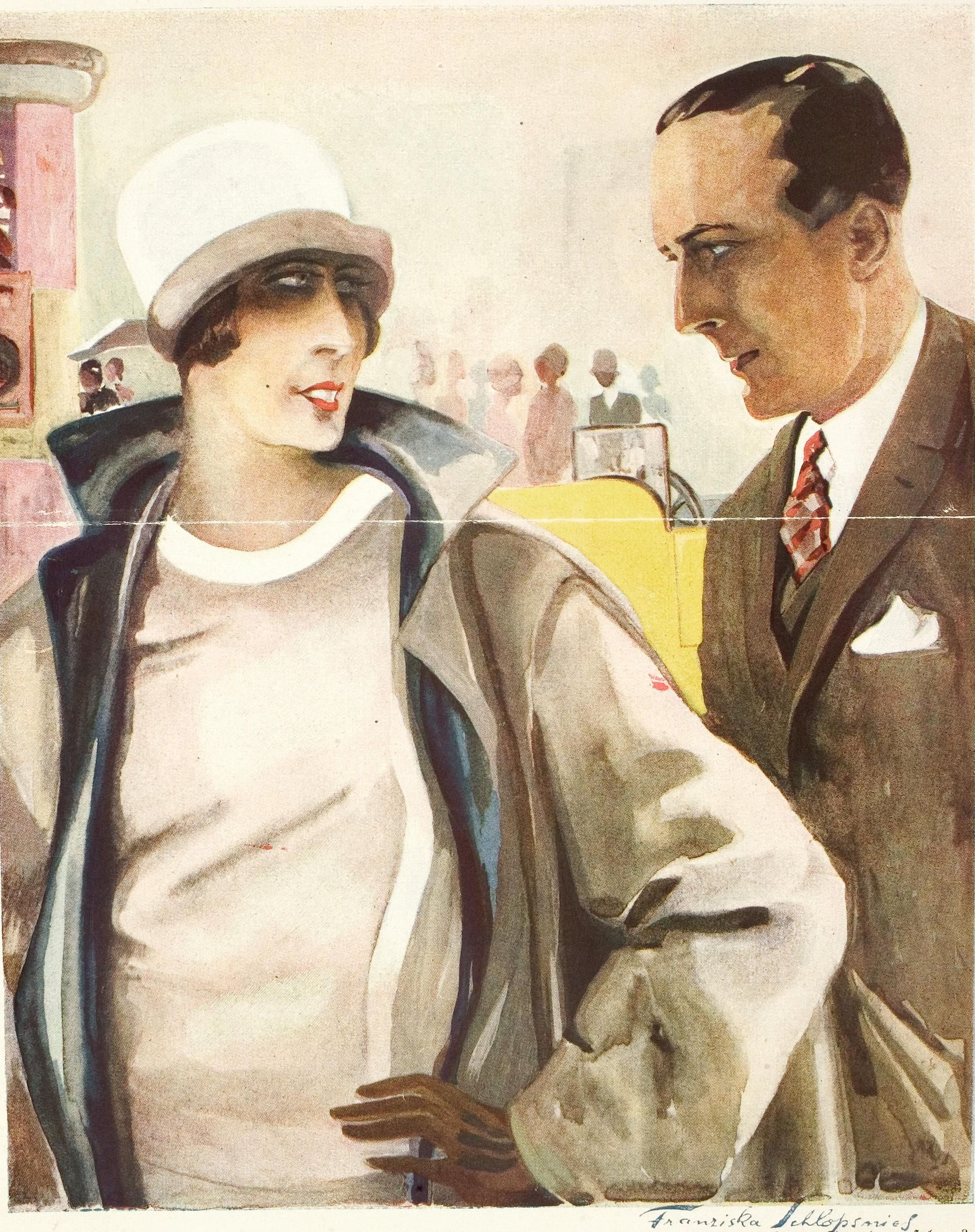
Offenherzig, 1927

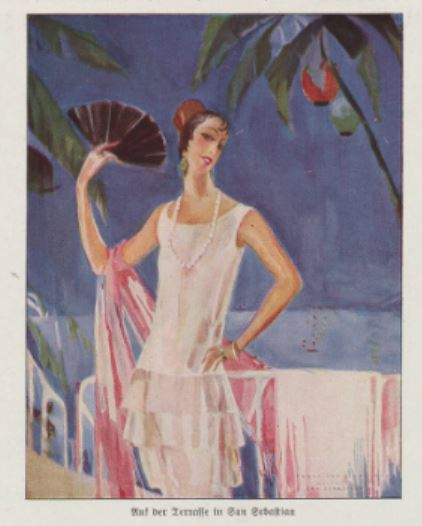
Auf der Terrasse von San Sebastian. 1927

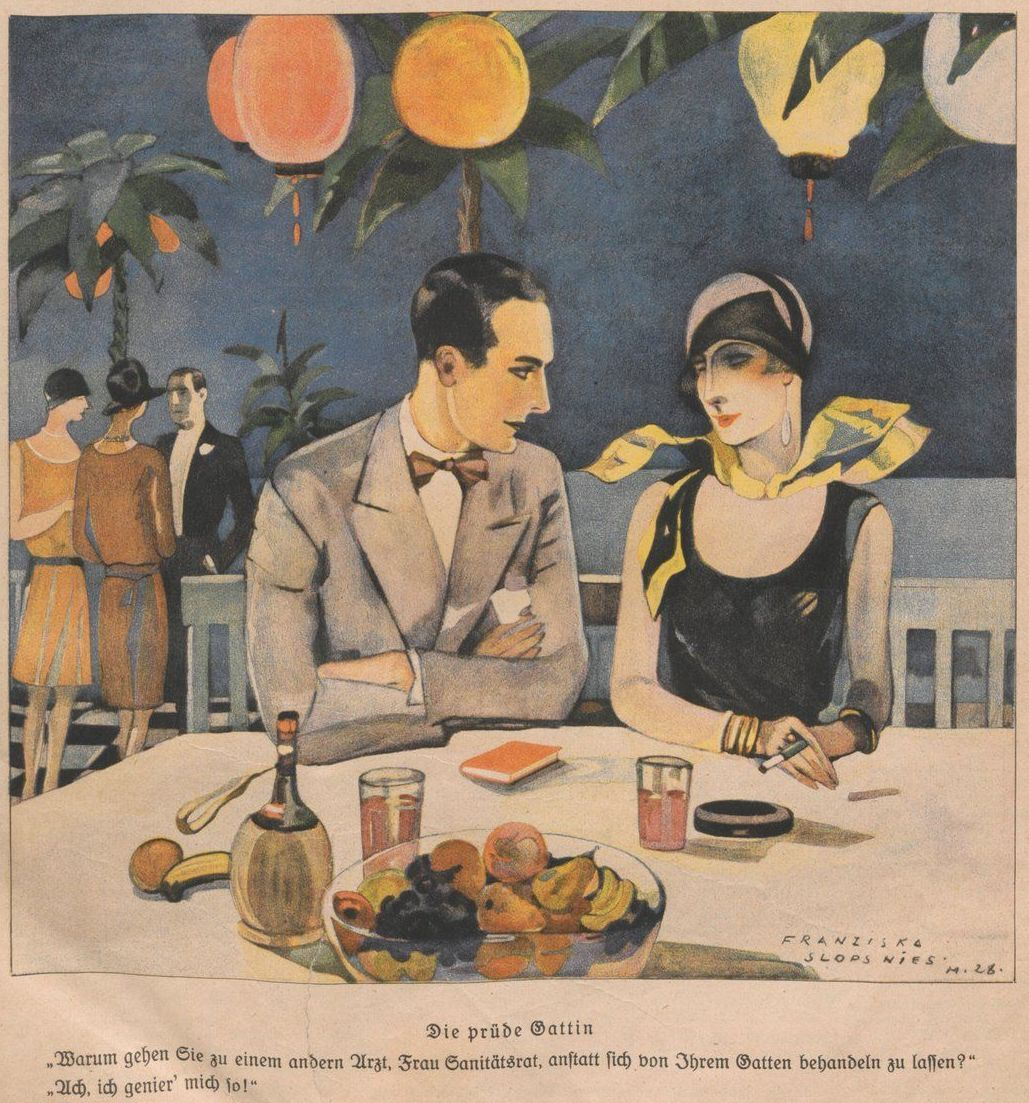
Die prüde Gattin, 1928

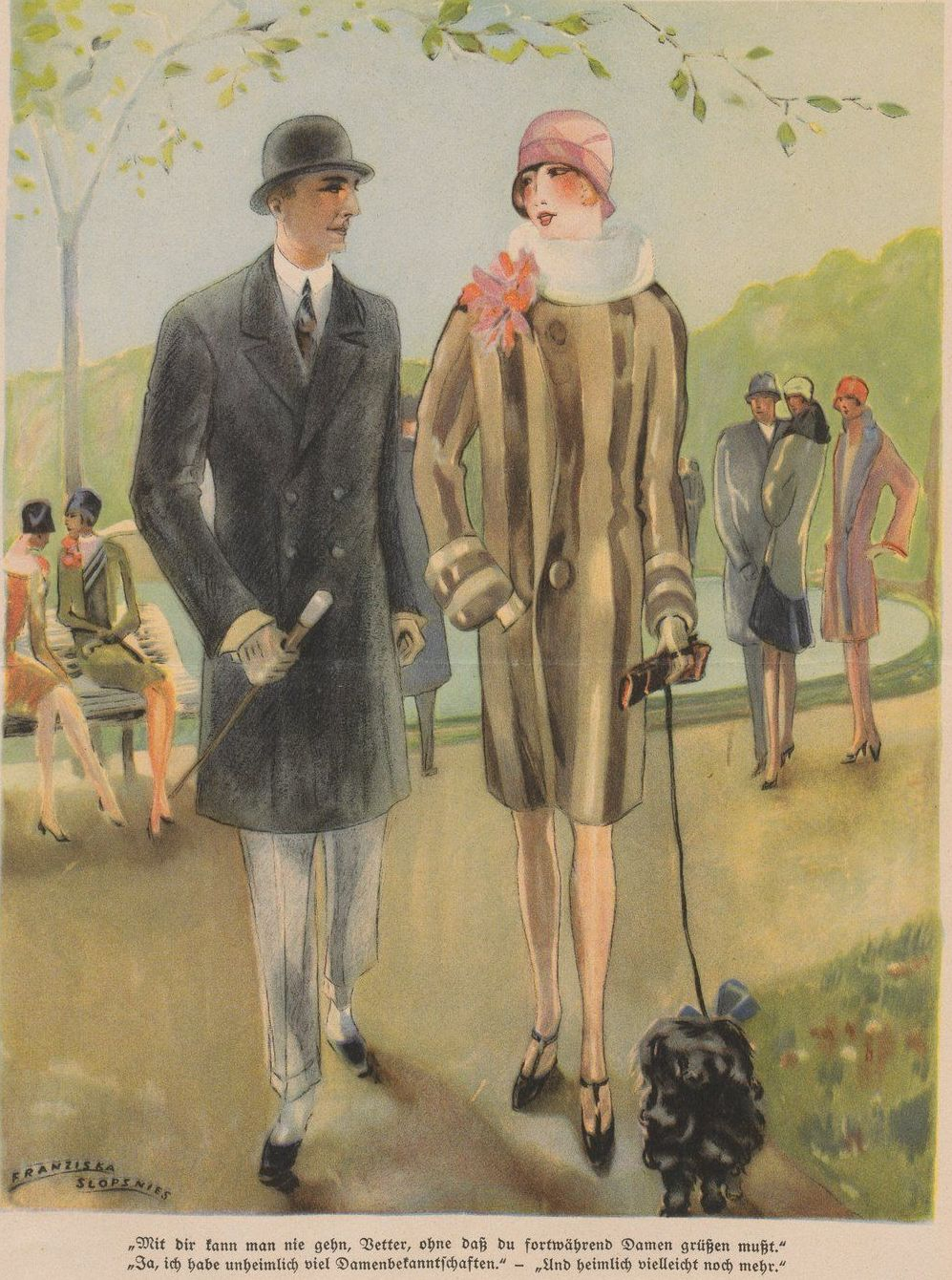
Mit Dir kann man nie gehen, Vetter.., 1929

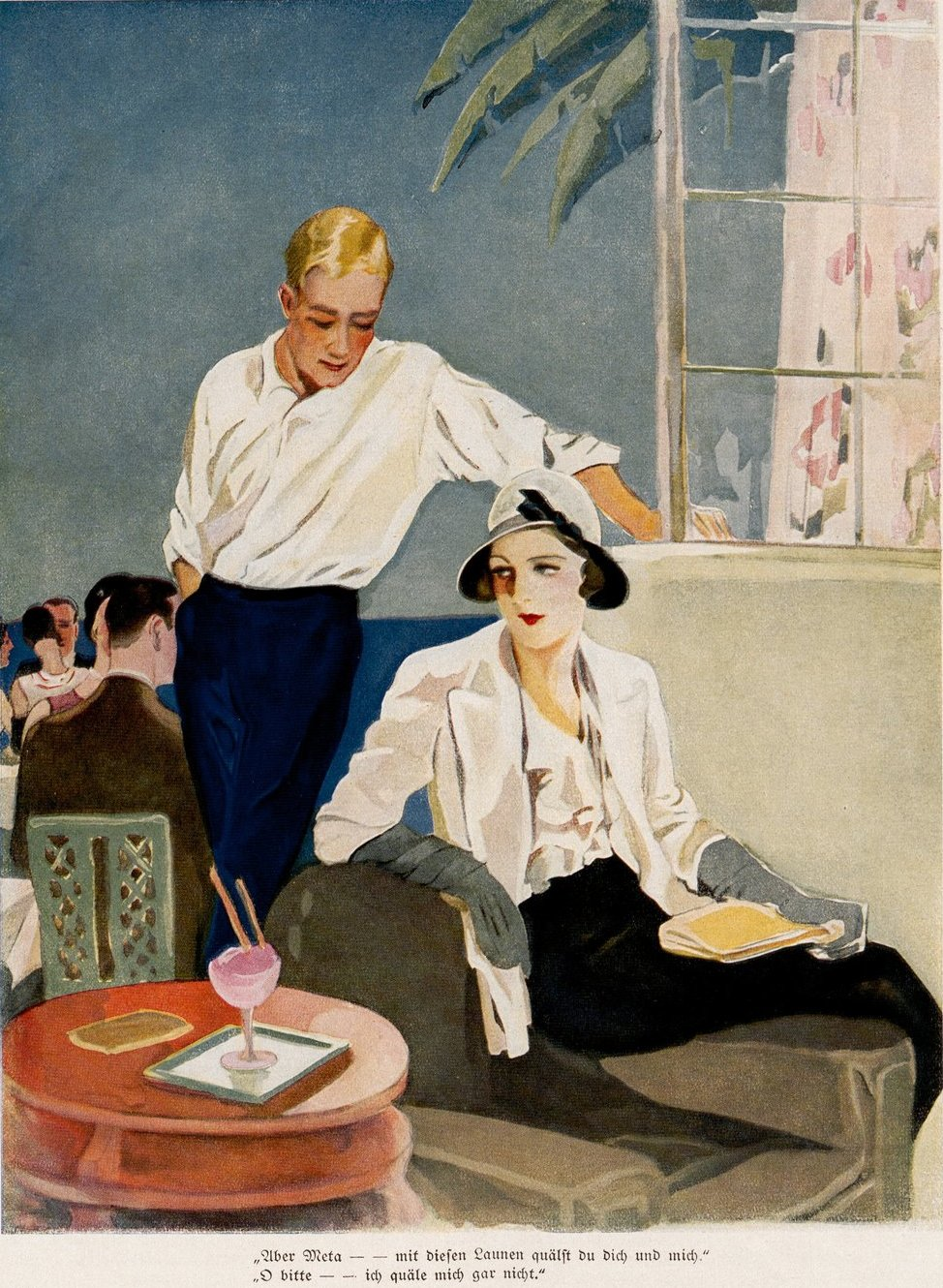
Aber Meta.., 1931

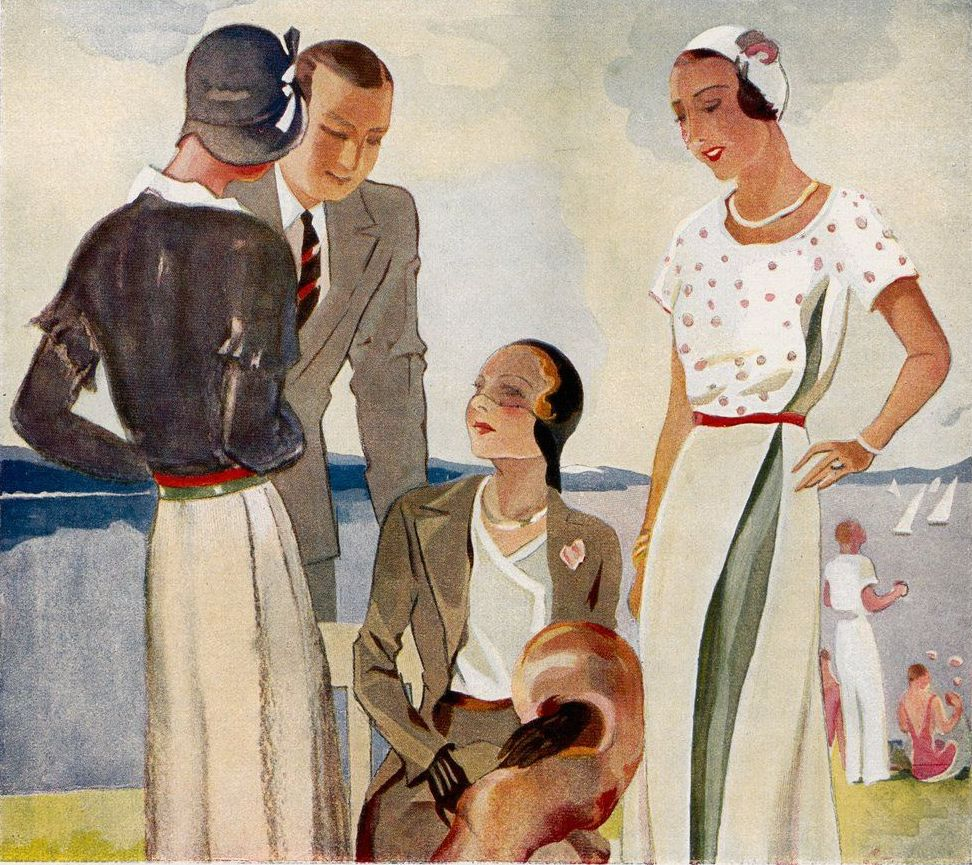
Diese Segler sind mir zu dreist, 1932
