= Lothar Meggendorfer =

German illustrator and paper engineer

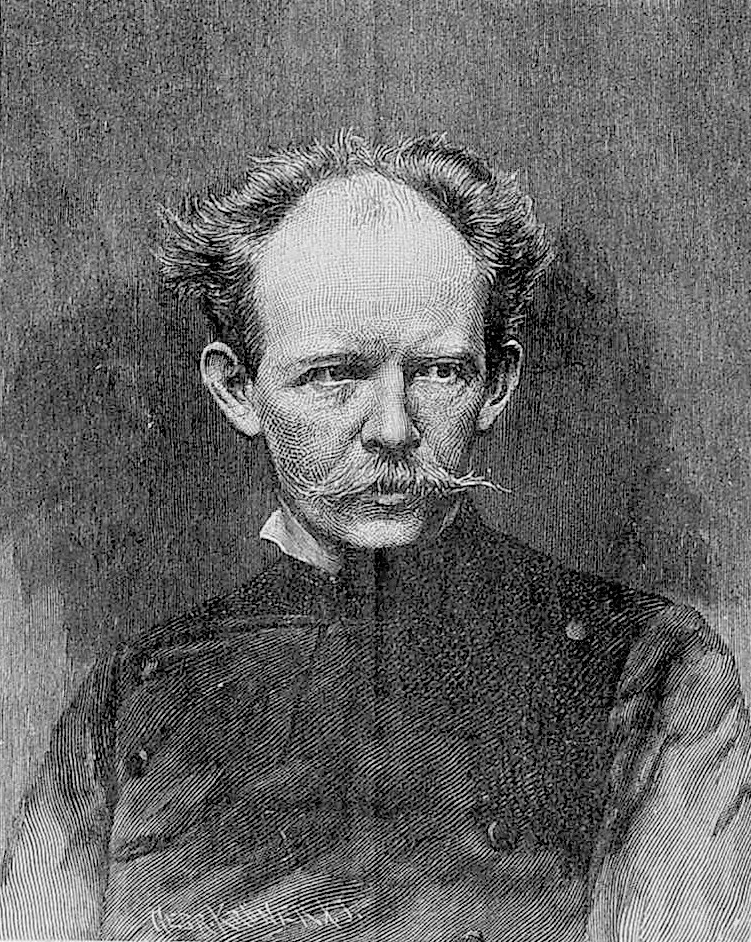
- Lothar Meggendorfer (1889)
- Born: November 6, 1847; Munich, Germany
- Died: July 7, 1925 (aged 77); Munich, Germany
- Occupations: Illustrator, paper engineer
- Spouse: Elise Roedel (m.June 23, 1873)
- Children: two sons, four daughters

Lothar Meggendorfer (6 November 1847 in Munich – 7 July 1925 in Munich) was a German illustrator and early cartoonist known for his pop-up books.

He was first published in 1862 in the Fliegende Blätter, an illustrated comic weekly, and from 1868 in the bi-weekly Münchener Bilderbogen. He was the publisher of Meggendorfer-Blätter, an art and satirical magazine, from 1888 to 1905. He also illustrated a number of books with text by Julius Beck, among them Neues Struwwelpeterbuch published by J.F. Schreiber in the 1890s, and created some 40 board games.

Every other year, the Movable Book Society awards a pop-up book prize named after Meggendorfer.

== Early life and education ==
Lothar Meggendorfer, born in 1847 to Johann Nepomuk Meggendorfer and his second wife, Karoline Sichener, was the youngest of his father’s twenty-five children. His father, Johann, died in 1860. Meggendorfer began studying art at the Academy of Arts in 1862 and earned money for his education by playing the zither.

Meggendorfer was a student of the Munich-based actor and puppeteer Joseph Schmid, who was also known as “Papa Schmid”. The puppet actions would later influence Meggendorfer’s artwork.

== Illustrator ==
Meggendorfer started working at the humor journal Fliegende Blätter (Flying Leaves), an illustrated comic weekly, in 1866. Others on staff included a former teacher, Wilhelm von Diez, and illustrators Wilhelm Busch, Caspar Braun, Max Haider, Eduard Ille, Ludwig von Negal, Adolf Oberlander, Franz von Pocci, Arpad Schmidhammer, and Moritz von Schwind.

Meggendorfer also illustrated for the bi-weekly Münchener Bilderbogen (Munich Pictures) published by Braun & Schneider.

== Paper Engineer ==
Researchers have noted that Meggendorfer explored ways to make his illustrations move. His first movable picture book, Lebende Bilder (Living Pictures), as a Christmas gift to his eldest son, Adolph. Braun & Schneider published the book in 1878.

Meggendorfer’s movable books were translated and sold not only in Germany but Belgium, Czechoslovakia, England, France, Hungary, Russia, Spain and the United States.

Movable book example by Lothar Meggendorfer

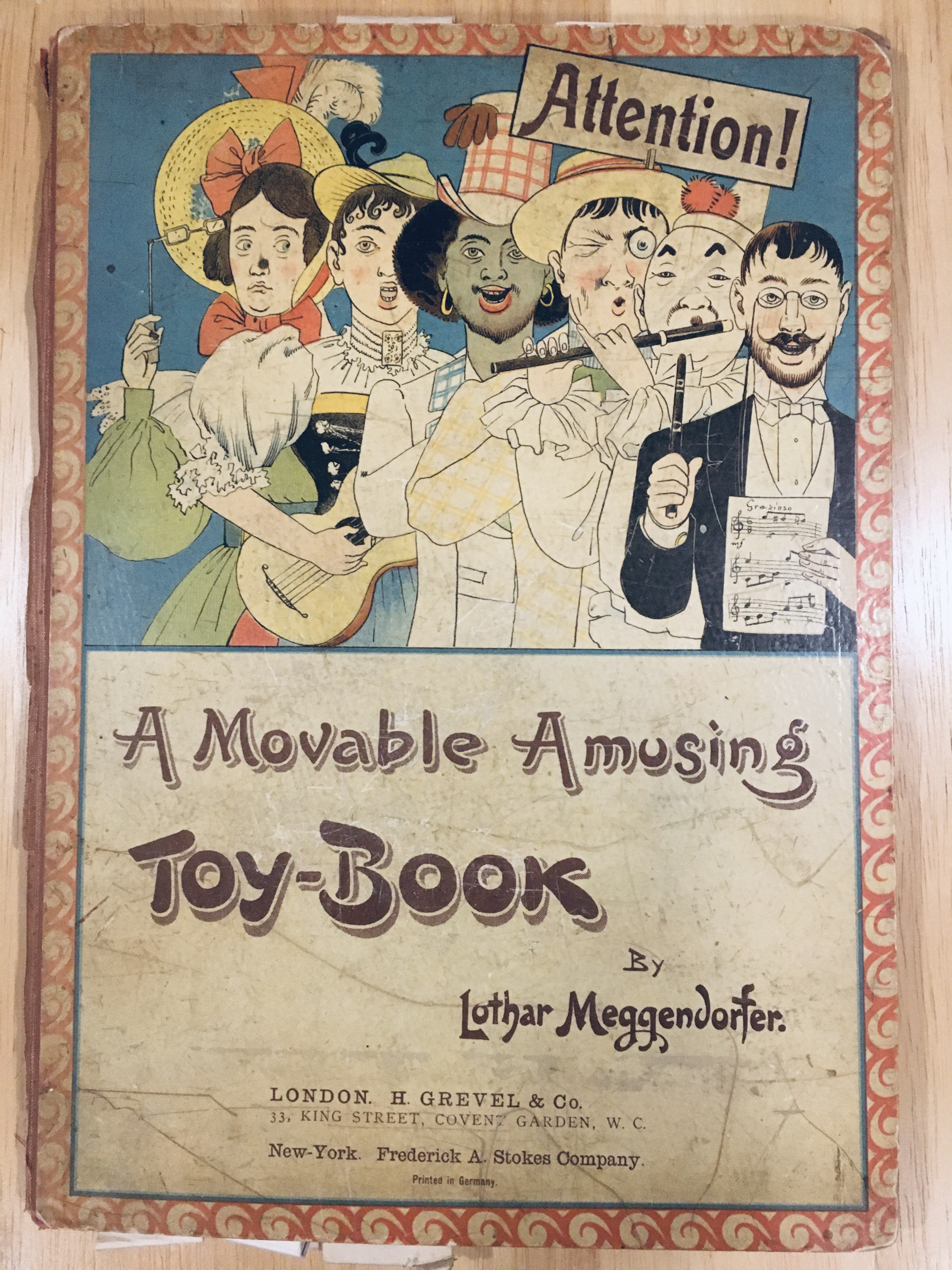
Attention! A Movable Amusing Toy-Book, 1906

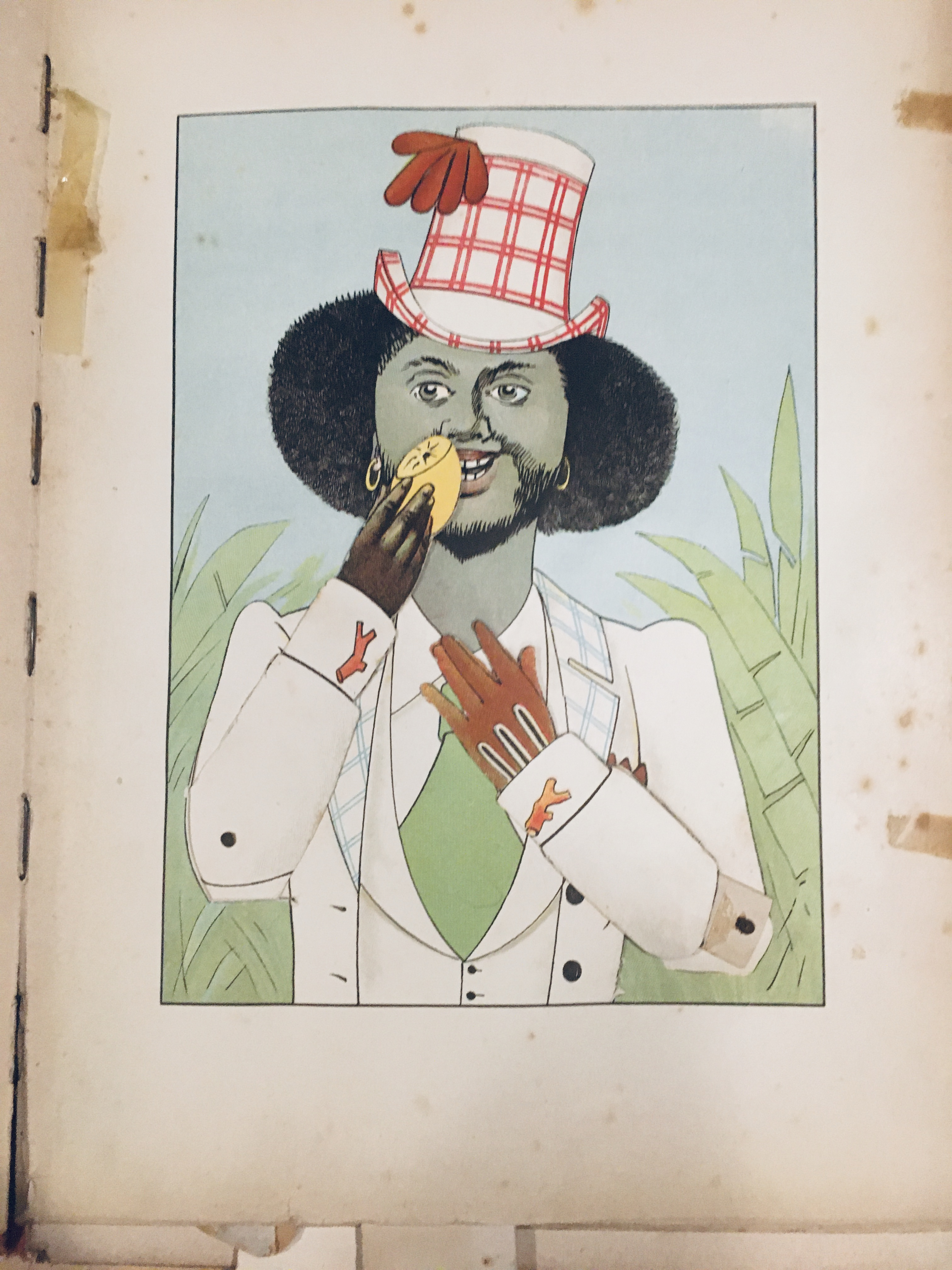
The Moor from Attention! Pull tab moves arms.

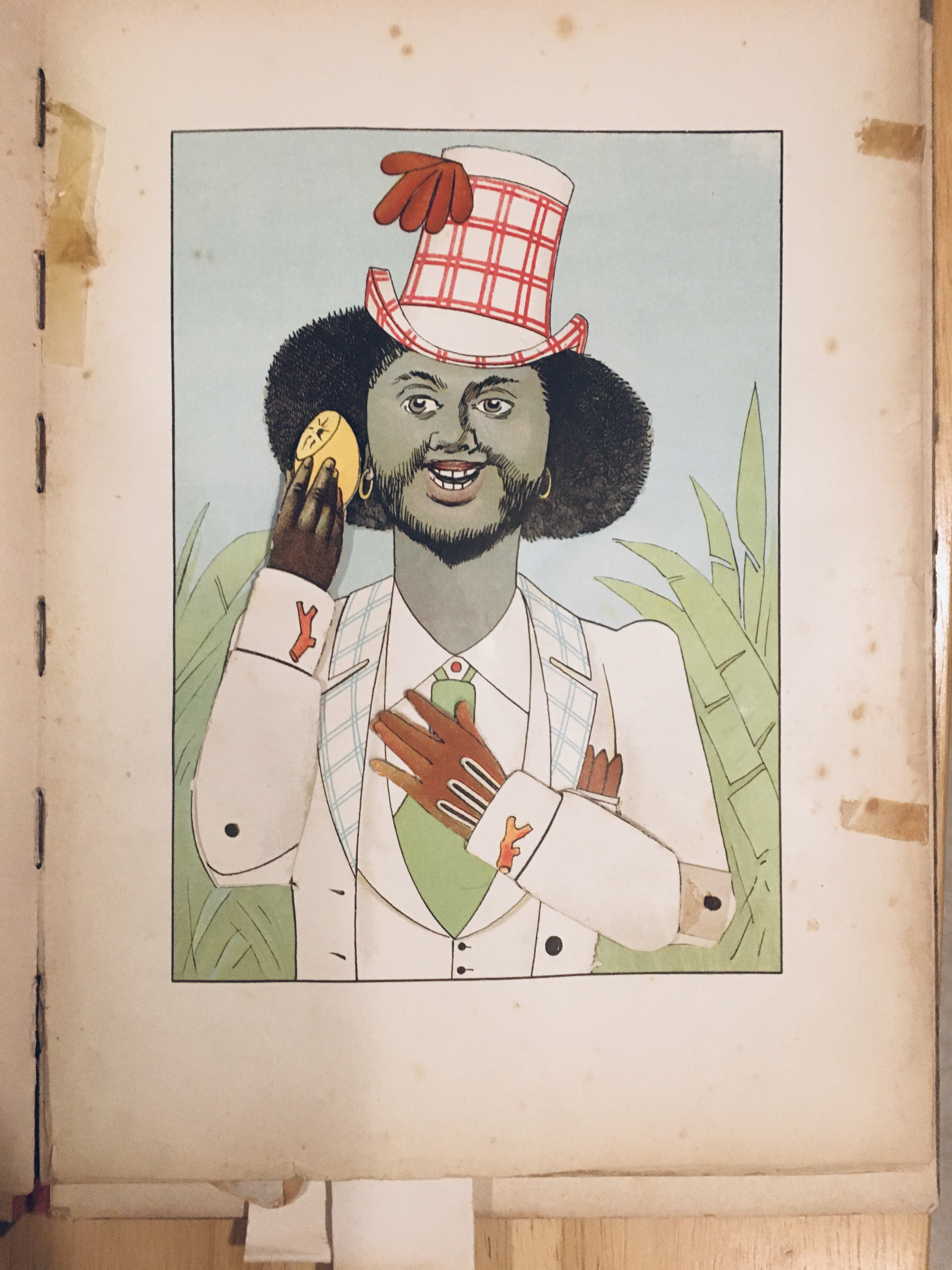
The Moor from Attention! Pull tab moves arms.

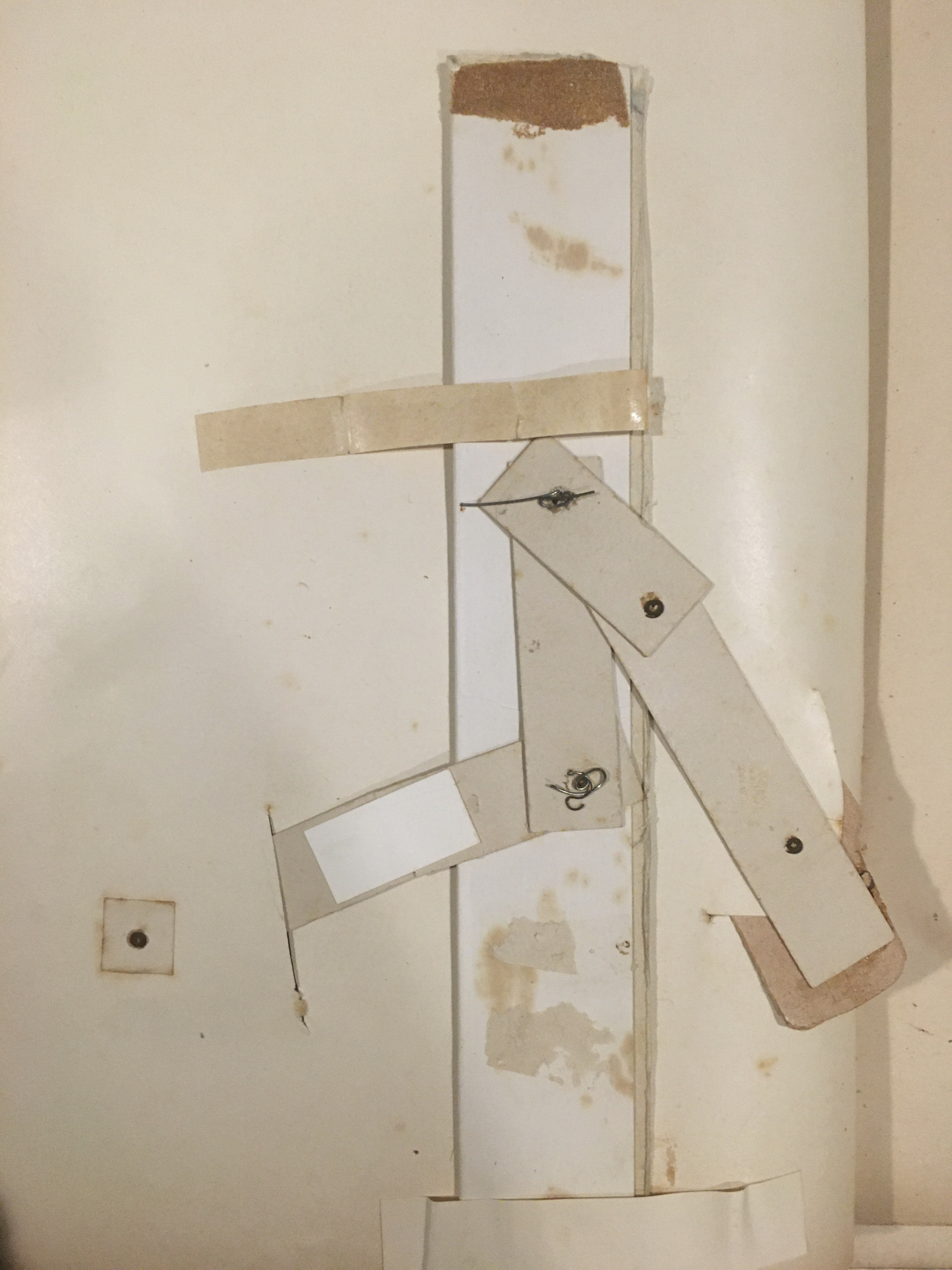
Rivets and tabs back side of The Moor from Attention!

== Family ==
Meggendorfer married Elise Roedel in 1873. They had six children, two sons and four daughters. From 1891 to 1901 the family lived on a farm on the Jägerhaus estate in Bad Kohlgrub, Upper Bavaria. The family were also musically inclined. Meggendorfer played the contra-guitar. Elise played the piano and the children various string instruments.

== Additional Reading ==
- Hildegard Krahé: Lothar Meggendorfers Spielwelt . Heinrich Hugendubel Verlag München 1983, ISBN 3-88034-201-6
- Lothar Meggendorfers Lebende Bilderbücher. Katalog zur Ausstellung des Puppentheatermuseums im Münchener Stadtmuseum 11. Dezember 1980 – 28. Februar 1981, Eigenverlag München
- Lothar Meggendorfer - Annotiertes Werkverzeichnis; Bücher und verwandte Druckwerke, Spiele, Modellierbogen; Bibliography; books and related printings, games, cut-out sheets. Bearbeitet von Georg Friedrich und Reinhilde von Katzenheim. edition comboxx, Berlin - Wien - Zürich 2012, Catalogues raisonnés, 395 pages. In German and English.
- Helmut Herbst: Die Illustrationen der "Meggendorfer Blätter. In: Oberbayrisches Archiv Band 106 Seite 7 – 228, Verlag des Historischen Vereins von Oberbayern 1982, München
- Doris von Senger: Lothar Meggendorfer und die Meggendorfer Blätter. Dissertation München 1938

== Selected works ==
Published by or including Lothar Meggendorfer

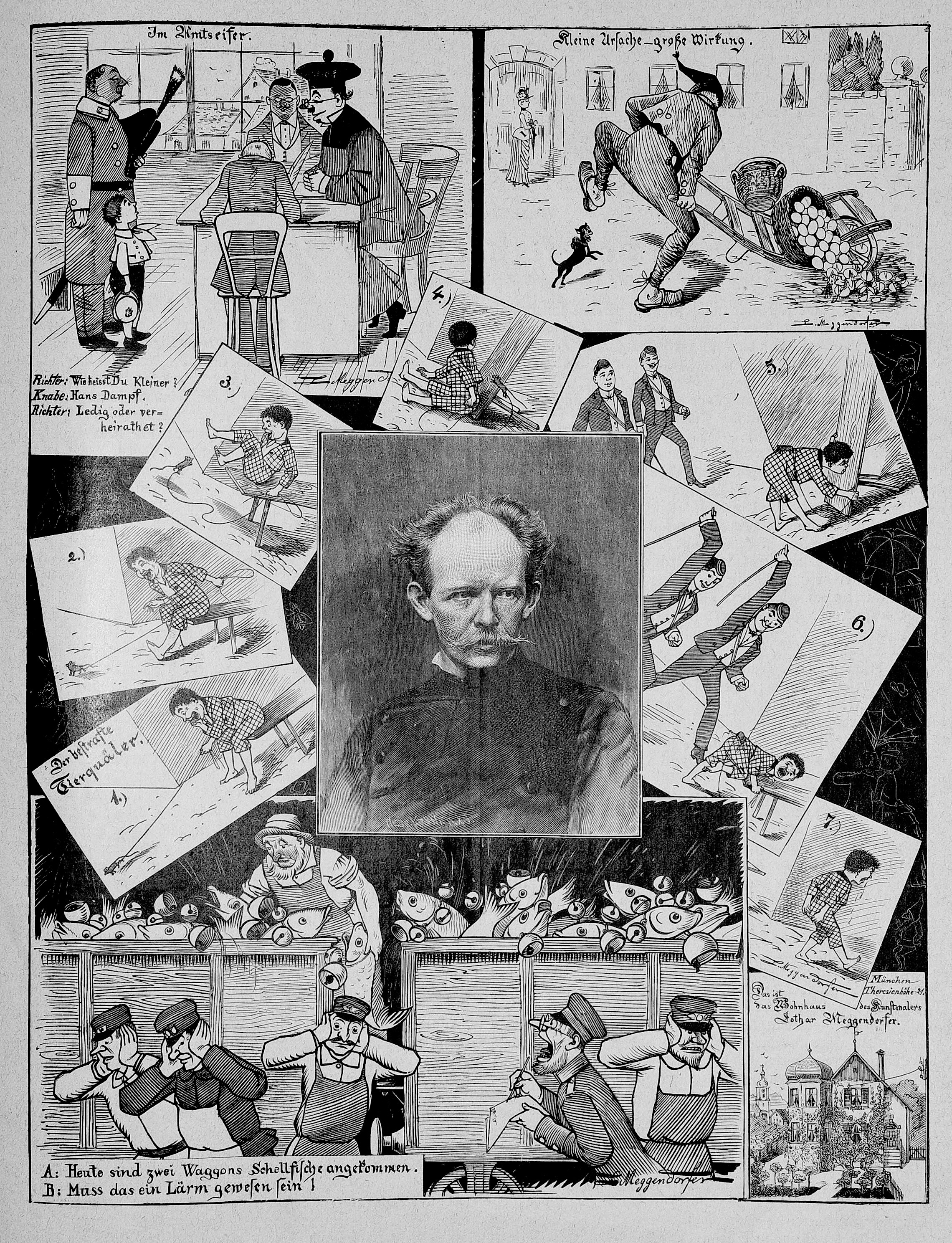
Lothar Meggendorfer and his works(1889)

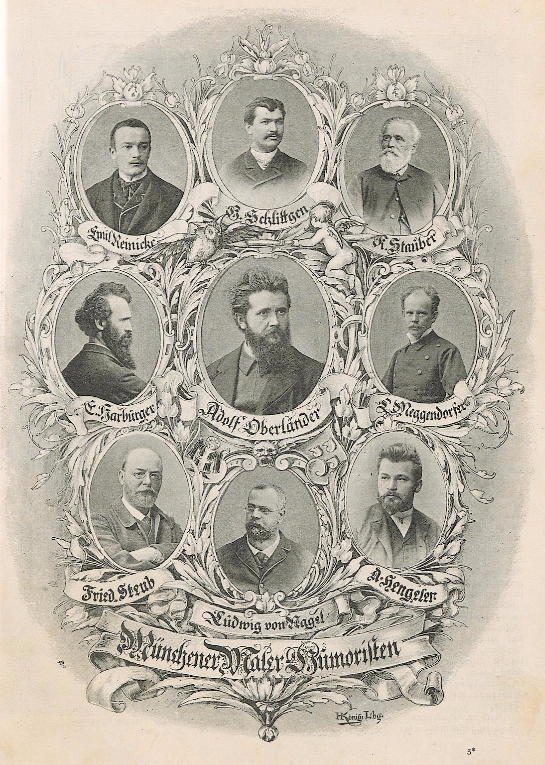
Münchener Maler-Humoristen illustrators 1890

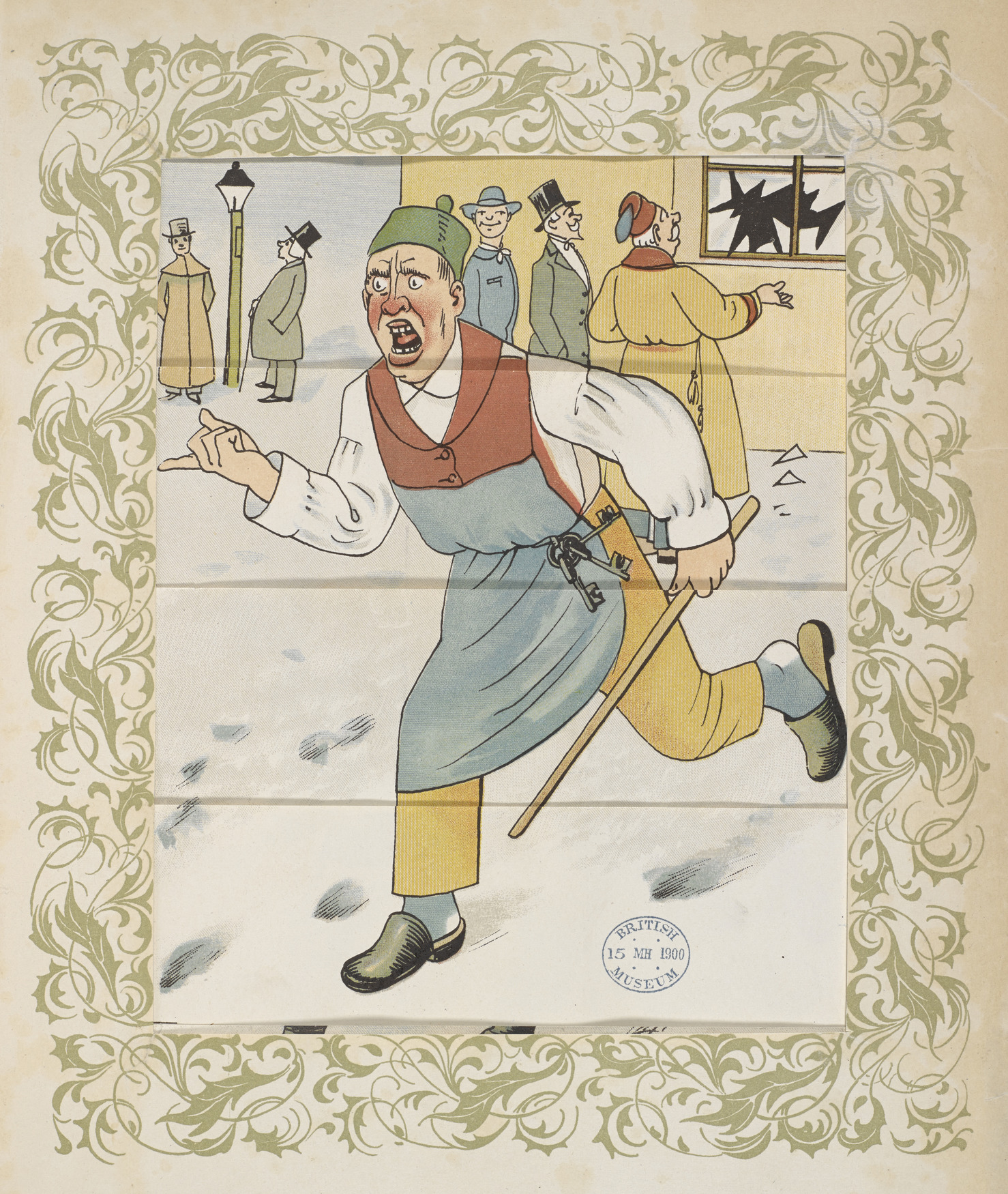
Breaking a shop window - The Tricks of Naughty Boys (1900), page 8b

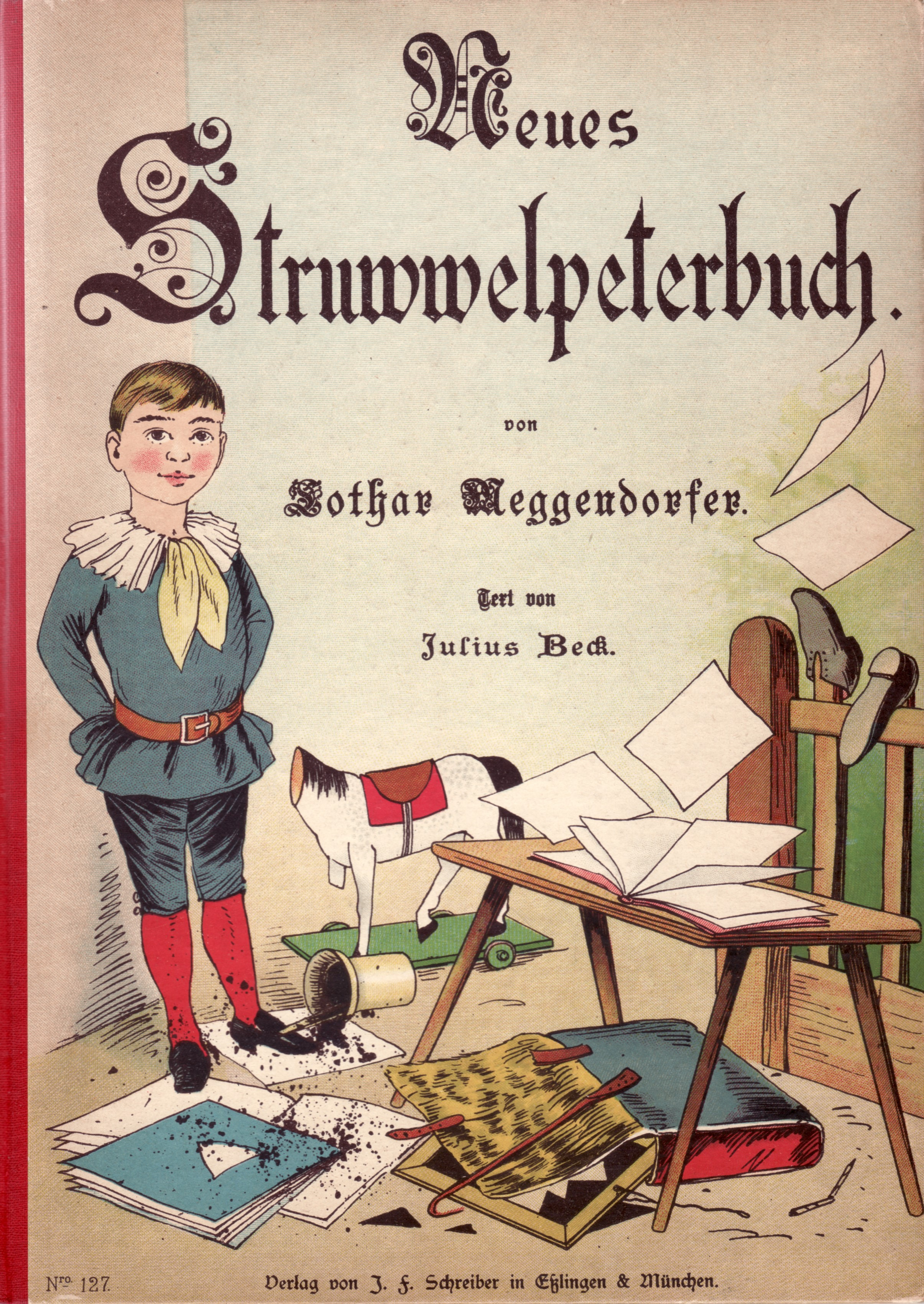
Neues Struwwelpeterbuch

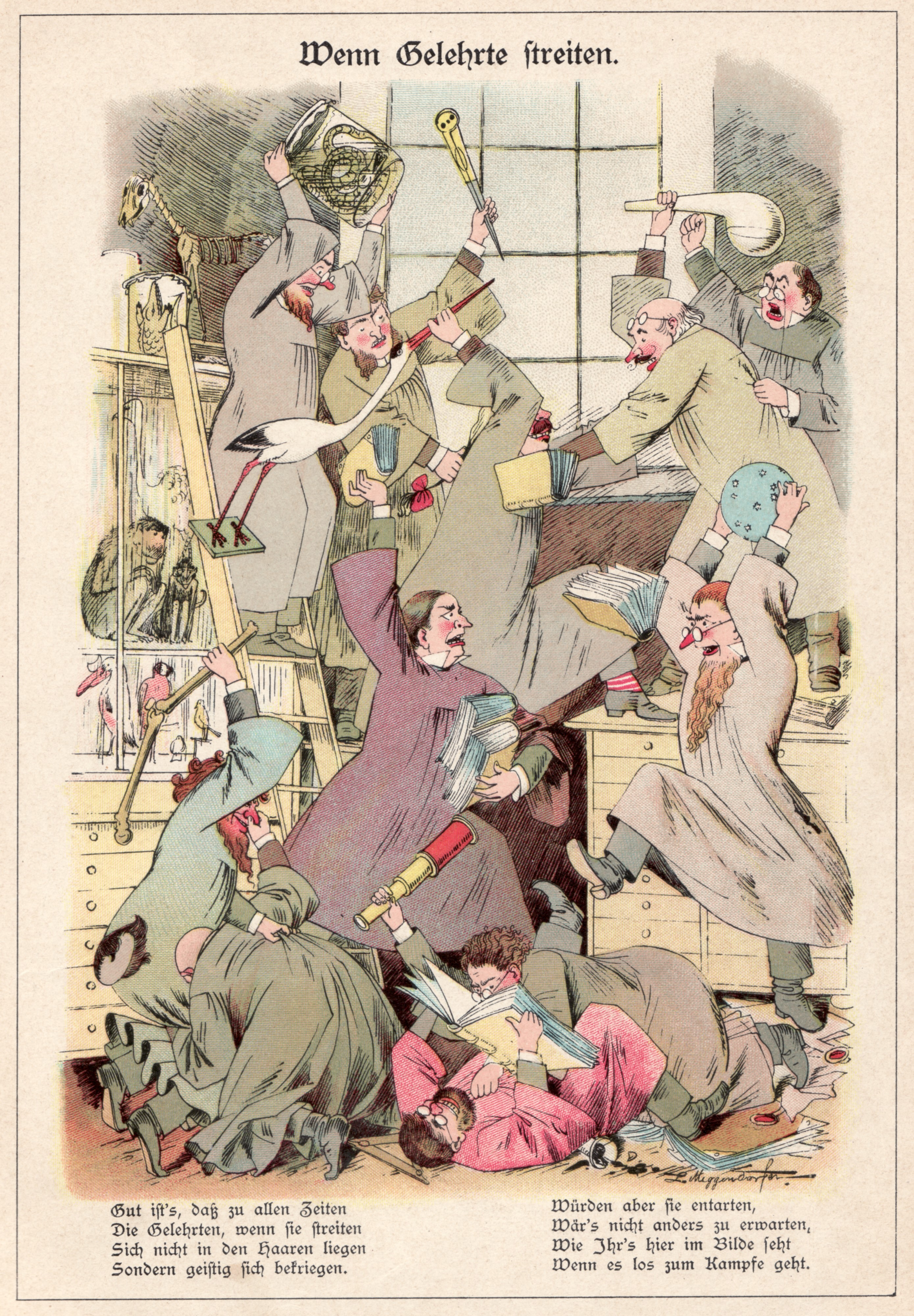
Meggendorfer’s Humoristische Blätter (1890)

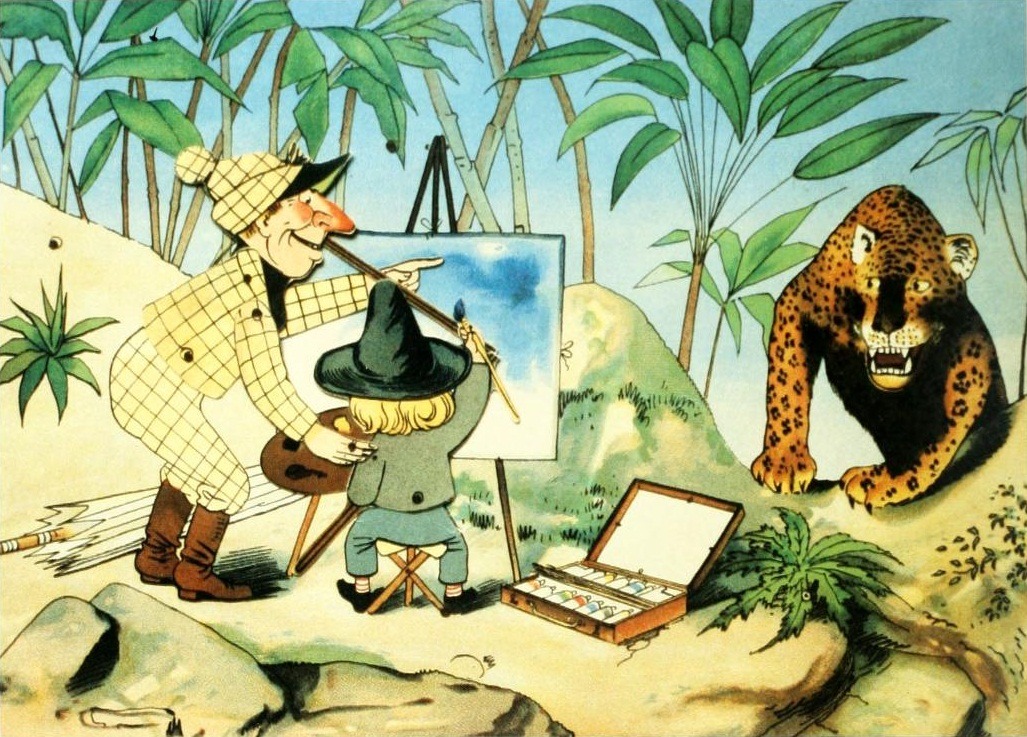
Travels of Little Lord Thumb and His Man Damien, 1891
