= Adolf Oberländer =

German artist (1845–1923)

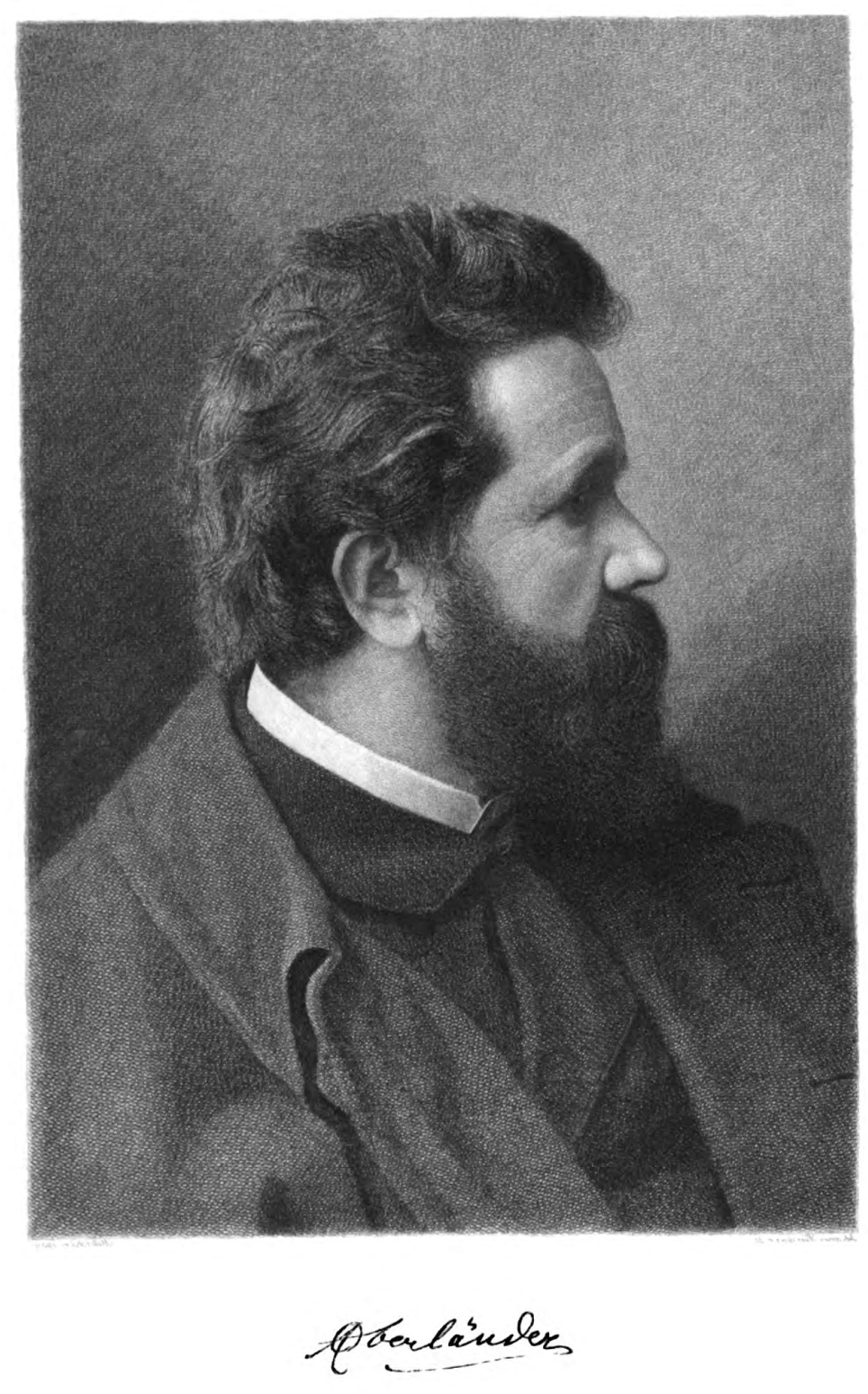
- Etching by Johann Lindner

Adam Adolf Oberländer (1 October 1845, Regensburg – 29 May 1923, Munich) was a Bavarian caricaturist, illustrator , cartoonist and early comics artist.

== Biography ==
Oberländer was born at Regensburg, but after 1847 lived in Munich. He studied painting at the Munich Academy under Karl von Piloty beginning in 1861, but found that historical painting did not suit his particular talent. He soon discovered that the true expression of his genius was in the field of caricature and comic drawings, revealed in a humorous cartoon published in 1863 in the Fliegende Blätter.

He joined the staff of the Fliegende Blätter, to which he became a constant contributor and leading artist. Unlike Wilhelm Busch, whose aim was the utmost simplicity of line, and whose drawings form a running commentary on the caption, Oberländer's work is essentially pictorial, and expressive in itself, without the extraneous aid of the written line. Among his best drawings are his parodies on the style of well-known painters, such as the Variations on the Kissing Theme. Other subjects are taken from mythology, fairy lore, fables, animal life and the customs and habits of the German middle class.

His works were collected in the Oberländer-Album, published by Braun and Schneider in Munich (1879–1901), and reprinted a number of times, most recently by Rosenheimer in 1982 (ISBN 3475523590). He was also a painter of some note, and pictures of his are in the galleries of Munich, Berlin, Dresden and other cities of Germany and in private collections.

== Selected drawings from Fliegende Blätter ==
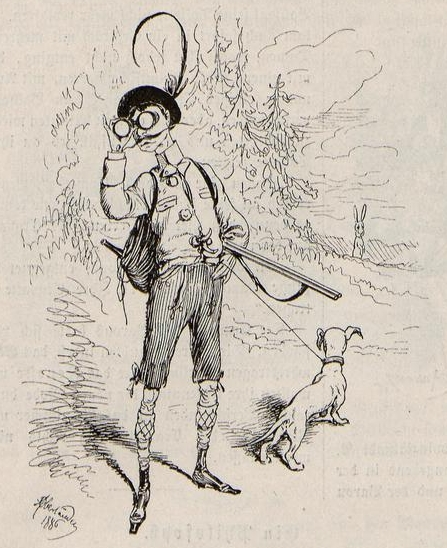

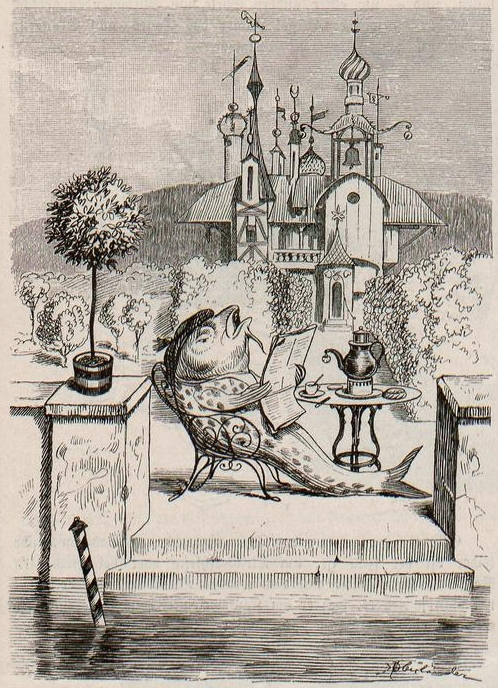

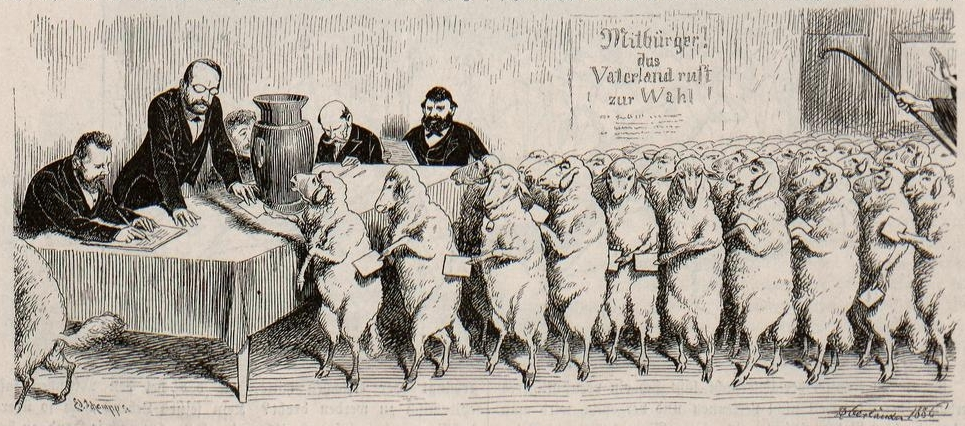

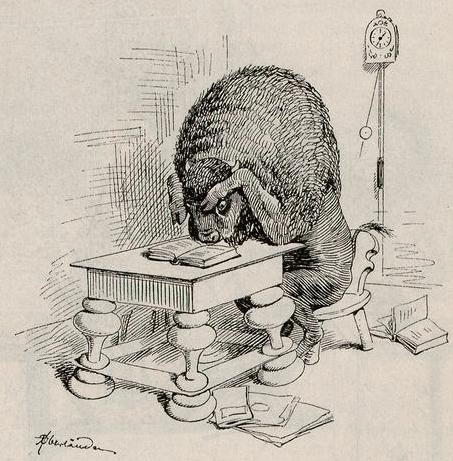
