= Julius Klinger =

Austrian painter (1876–1942)

- Born: 22 May 1876; Dornbach, Austria-Hungary
- Died: June 1942 (aged 65–66); Maly Trostenets, Reichskommissariat Ostland
- Known for: Poster artist, painter, illustrator, lithographer, designer
- Movement: Deutscher Werkbund

Julius Klinger (22 May 1876 – 1942) was an Austrian painter, draftsman, illustrator, commercial graphic artist, typographer and writer. Klinger studied at the Technologisches Gewerbemuseum HTL in Vienna.

== Career ==
=== Early works in Vienna and Munich ===
Meggendorfer-Blätter, 1930

Klinger was born in Dornbach near Vienna. In 1895, he found his first employment with the Vienna fashion magazine Wiener Mode. Here he made acquaintance with Koloman Moser, who later would be his teacher; Moser recommended him to the Meggendorfer-Blätter.

1896 saw him moving to Munich where he worked as an illustrator for the Meggendorfer-Blätter and others. From 1897 to 1902 he was a collaborator to the eponymous Jugendstil magazine Die Jugend.

=== Berlin ===
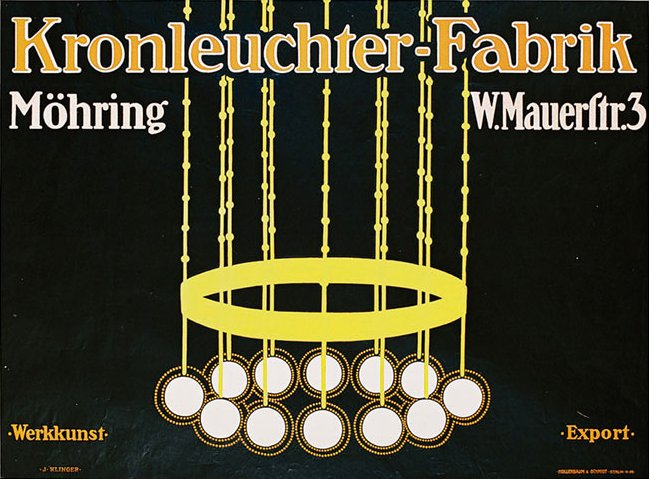
Julius Klinger: 1908, Möhring candelabra factory

In 1897 he relocated to Berlin, where he worked extensively as a commercial graphic artist until 1915. Together with the printing house Hollerbaum und Schmidt, he developed a new fashion of functional poster design that soon gained him international reputation. In 1912 he designed the poster for the Rund um Berlin air show in Johannisthal. In Berlin he also contributed to Das kleine Witzblatt, Lustige Blätter and Das Narrenschiff humorous magazines.

=== Advertising campaign for the "Tabu" company ===
Julius Klinger: firewall, ca. 1920

Beginning in 1918, Klinger designed a comprehensive and noted campaign promoting the "Tabu" company's cigarette rolling paper, that was advertised all over Vienna in 1918/19. Klinger devised a promotional strategy, spanning from small-sized newspaper advertisements to billboards and painted firewalls – construction site fences and winterized fountain paneling were used as advertising space, too.

== Nazi persecution ==
Klinger was persecuted by the National Socialists because he was Jewish. According to Viennese police records, he and his wife Emilie were registered as "Moved to Minsk" on 2 June 1942.

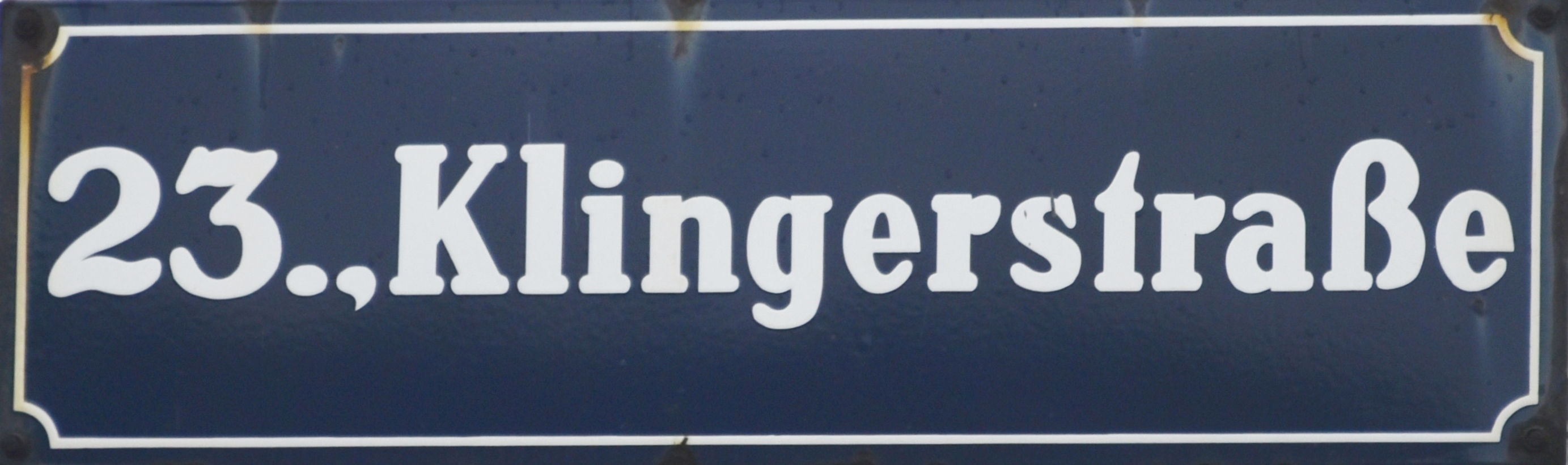
Street sign, Vienna

In 1982, Klingerstraße in Vienna-Liesing was named after him.

== Literature ==
- Anita Kühnel: Julius Klinger – Bilderheft der Staatlichen Museen zu Berlin (Catalogue of the Berlin State Museums), Gebr. Mann, Berlin, 1999

== Gallery ==
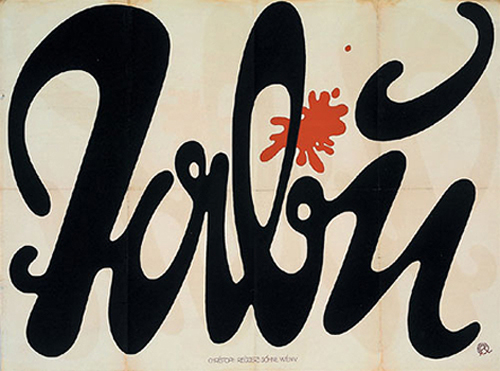
Ad for "Tabu" cigarette paper (1919)

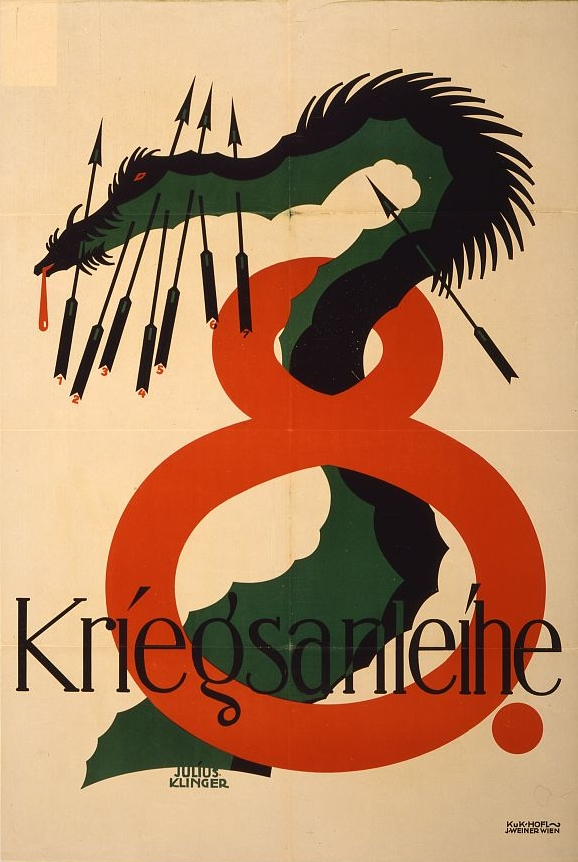
Poster for 8^{e} war loan, Austria-Hungary (1918)

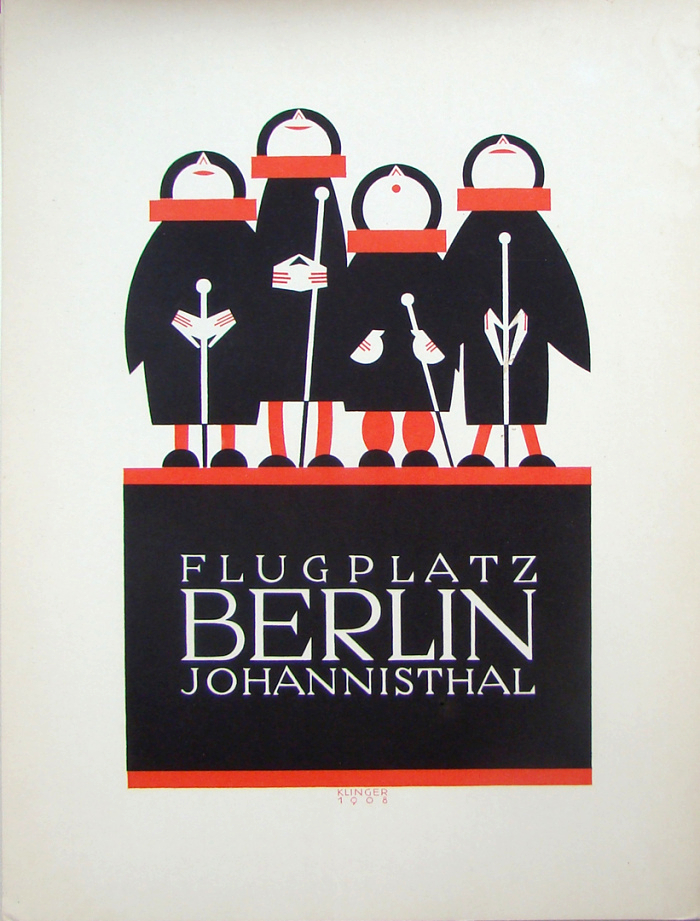
Berlin Johannisthal Airport (1908)

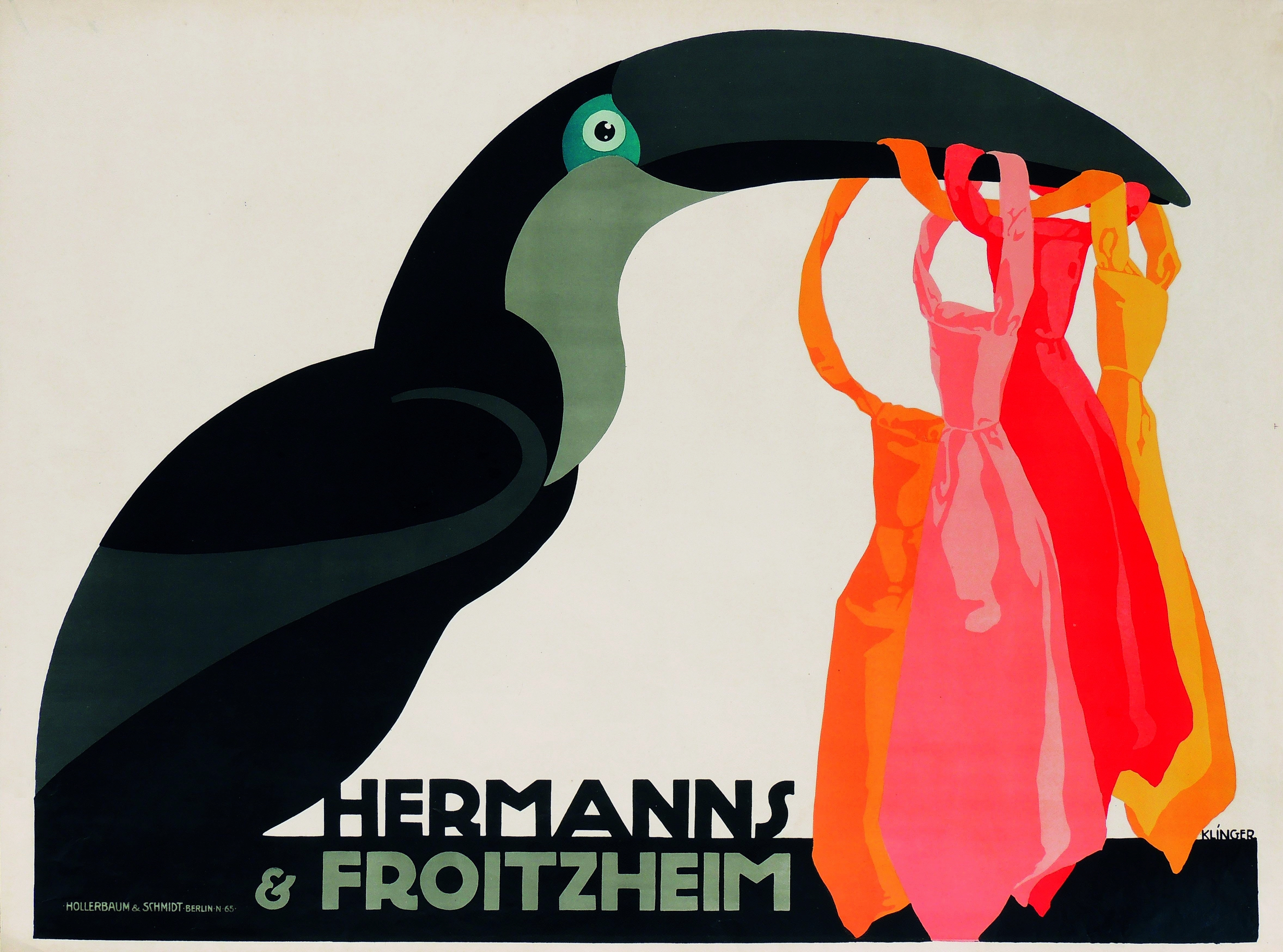
Ties Hermanns & Froitzheim (1911)

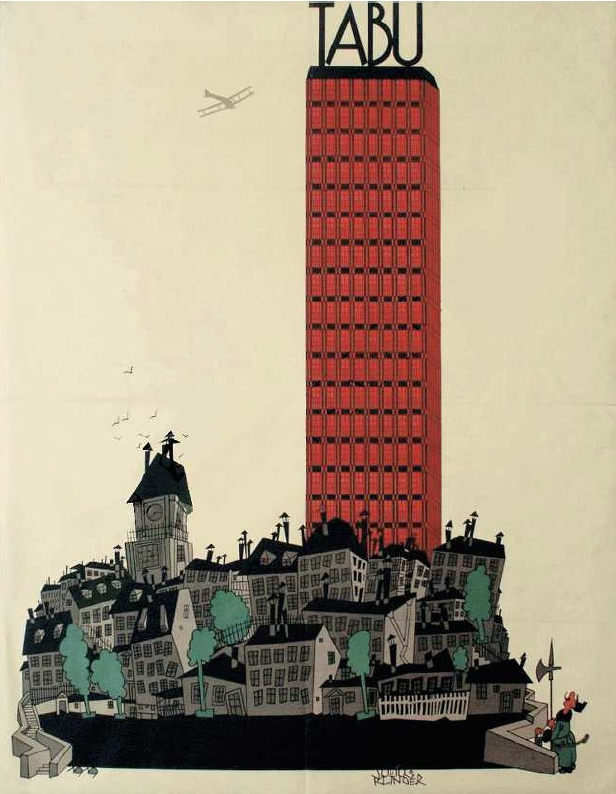
Poster for "Tabu" cigarette paper (1919)

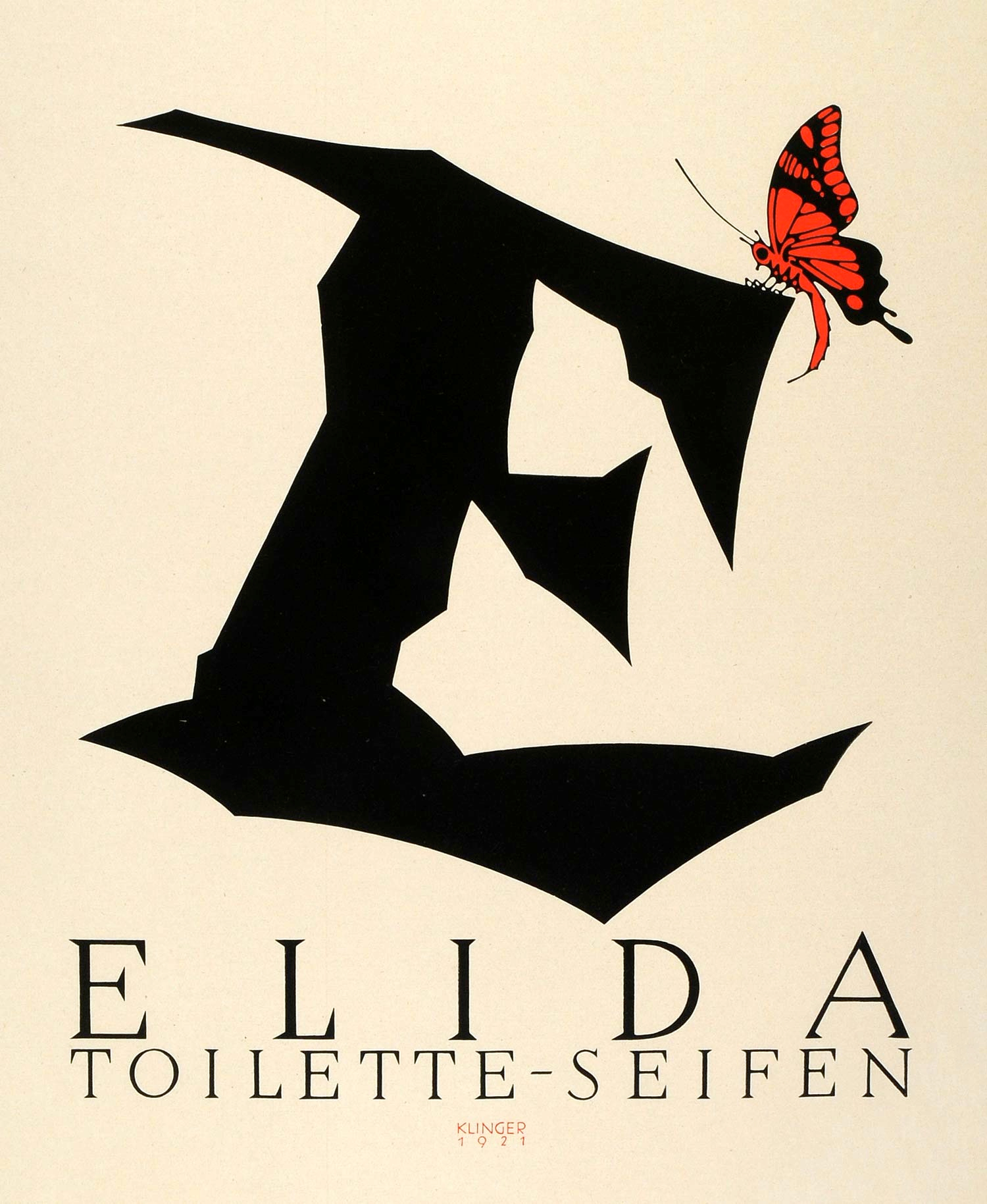
Poster for "Elida" toilet soap (1921)

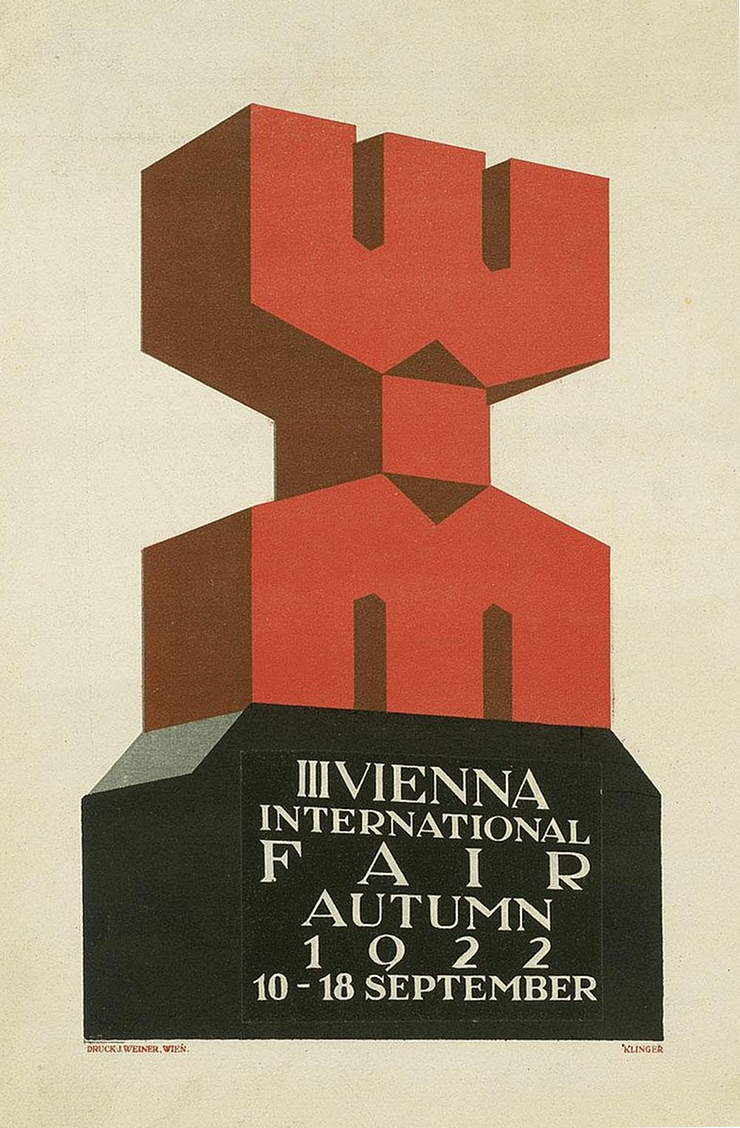
Vienna International Fair (1922)

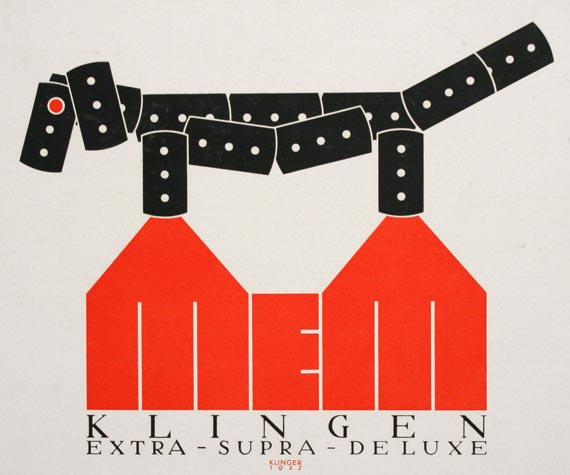
"MEM" (M. E. Mayer, Vienna) razor blades (1922)

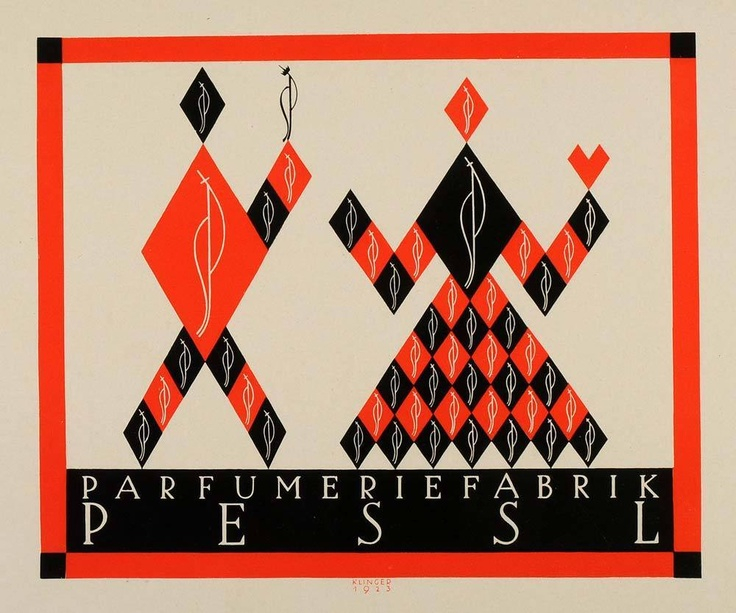
Poster of the Viennese perfume company Pessl (1923)

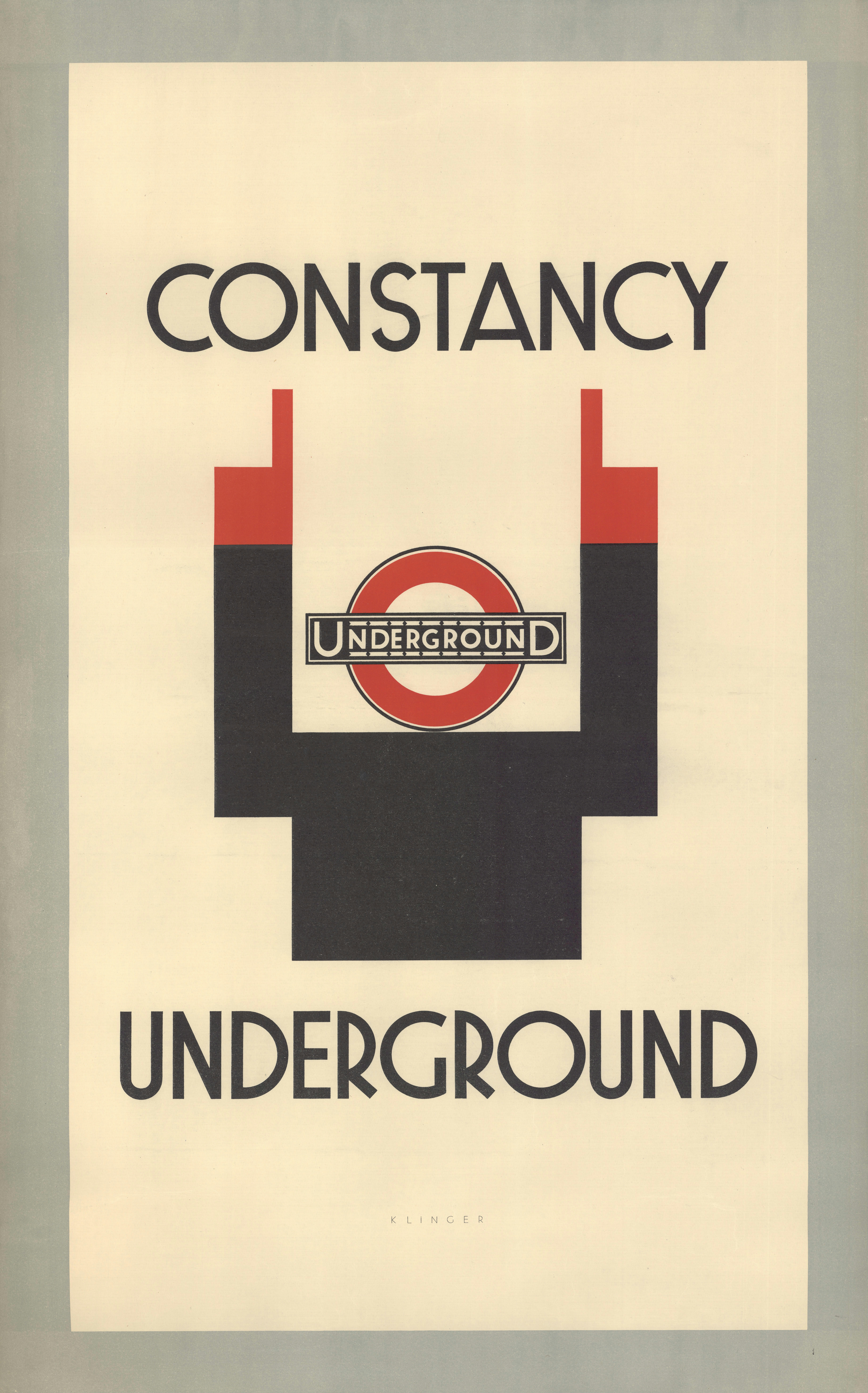
London Underground (1929)
