= Meggendorfer-Blätter =

German art magazine (1888–1944)

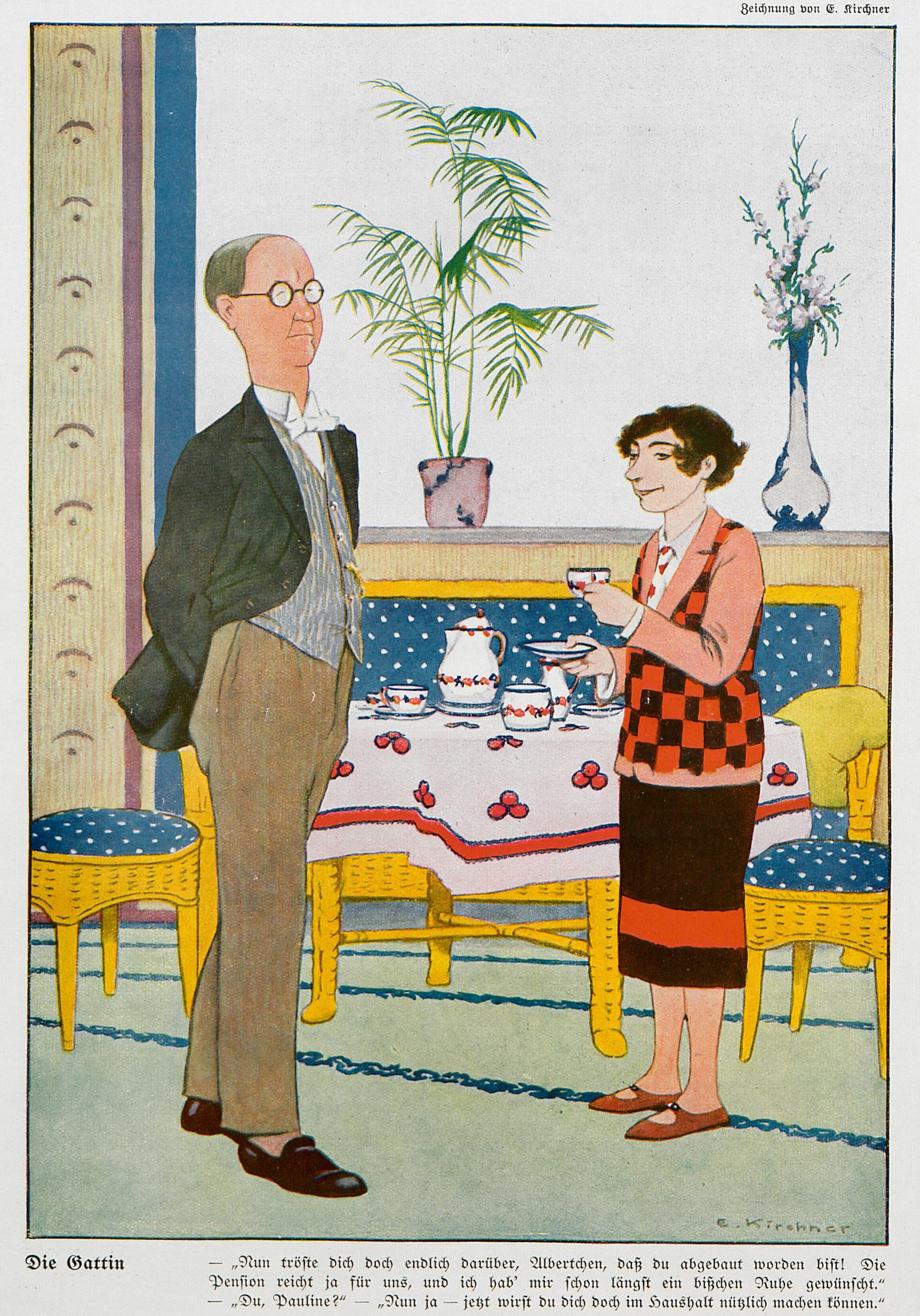
- Die Gattin in Meggendorfer-Blätter dated 1926
- Categories: Arts and satirical magazine
- Founded: 1888
- Final issue: 1944
- Country: Germany
- Based in: Munich
- Language: German

Meggendorfer-Blätter was a German art and satirical magazine, which was published in Munich, Germany, from 1888 to 1944. The magazine was closely related to the illustrator and painter Lothar Meggendorfer (1847-1925).

== History and profile ==
The magazine was started in 1888 under the name Aus Lothar Meggendorfers lustiger Bildermappe. From 1890 and 1897, it was called Meggendorfers Humoristische Blätter. Then it was renamed Meggendorfer-Blätter until 1925. In 1928, it merged with Fliegende Blätter, a German weekly non-political satirical magazine. The magazine had its headquarters in Munich.

Lothar Meggendorfer was the publisher of the magazine who left it in 1905. He was also instrumental in selecting the content and appearance of the journal and contributed to the journal through illustrations for jokes, short stories and poems, caricatures as well as stories told in pictorial form. Josef Mauder succeeded Meggendorfer as the director of the magazine.

The contributor illustrators included Julius Klinger, Josef Mukarovsky (1851-1921), Otto Bromberger (1862-1943) and Victor Schramm (1865-1929). Mila Von Luttich, an Austrian painter and illustrator, published her illustrations in the magazine between 1902 and 1914. Franziska Schlopsnies (1884-1944), Jewish painter and illustrator deported to Auschwitz, also published her illustrations in the magazine between 1926 and 1927.
