= Fliegende Blätter =

German magazine (1844–1944)

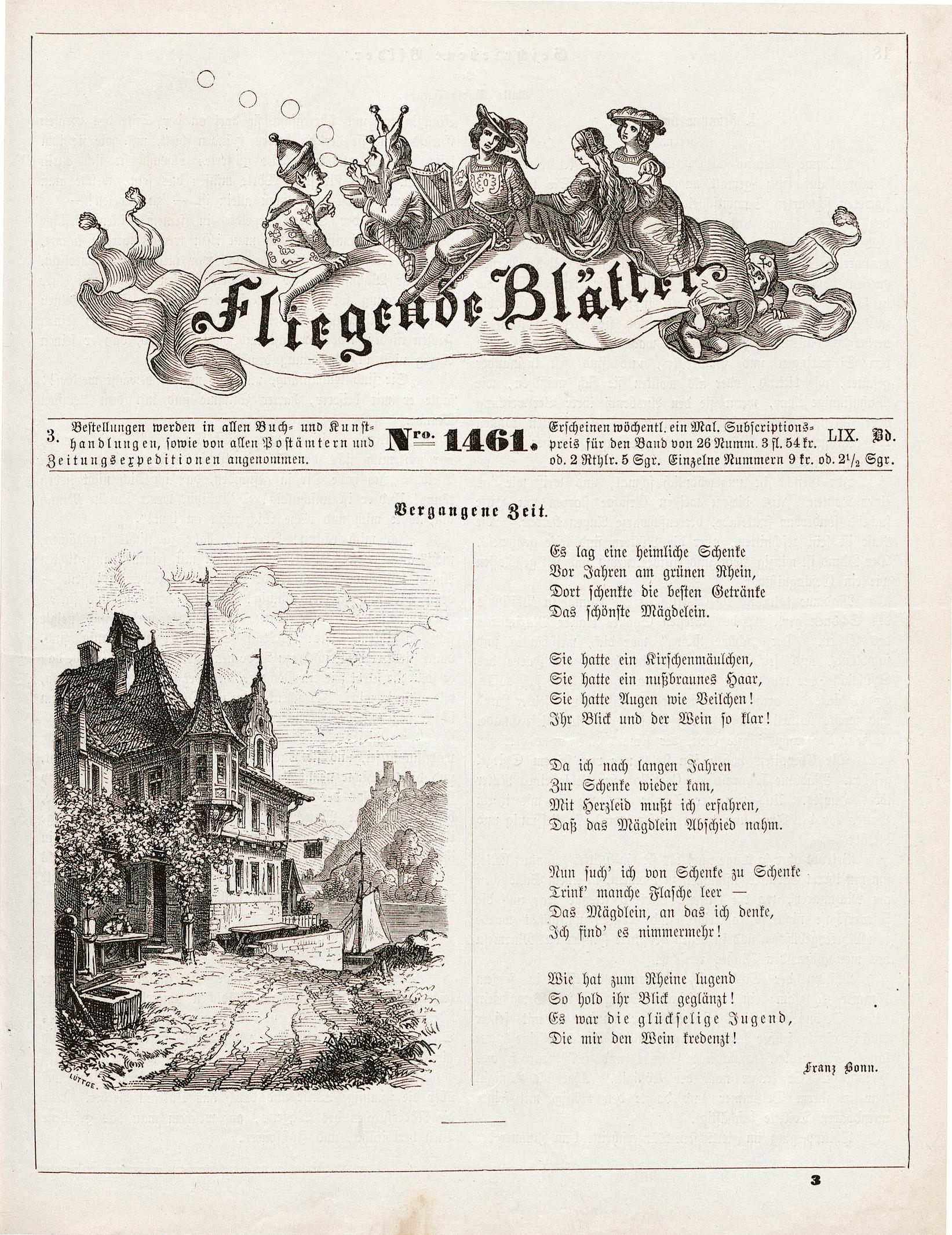
Frontpage of an issue of the Blätter from 1873

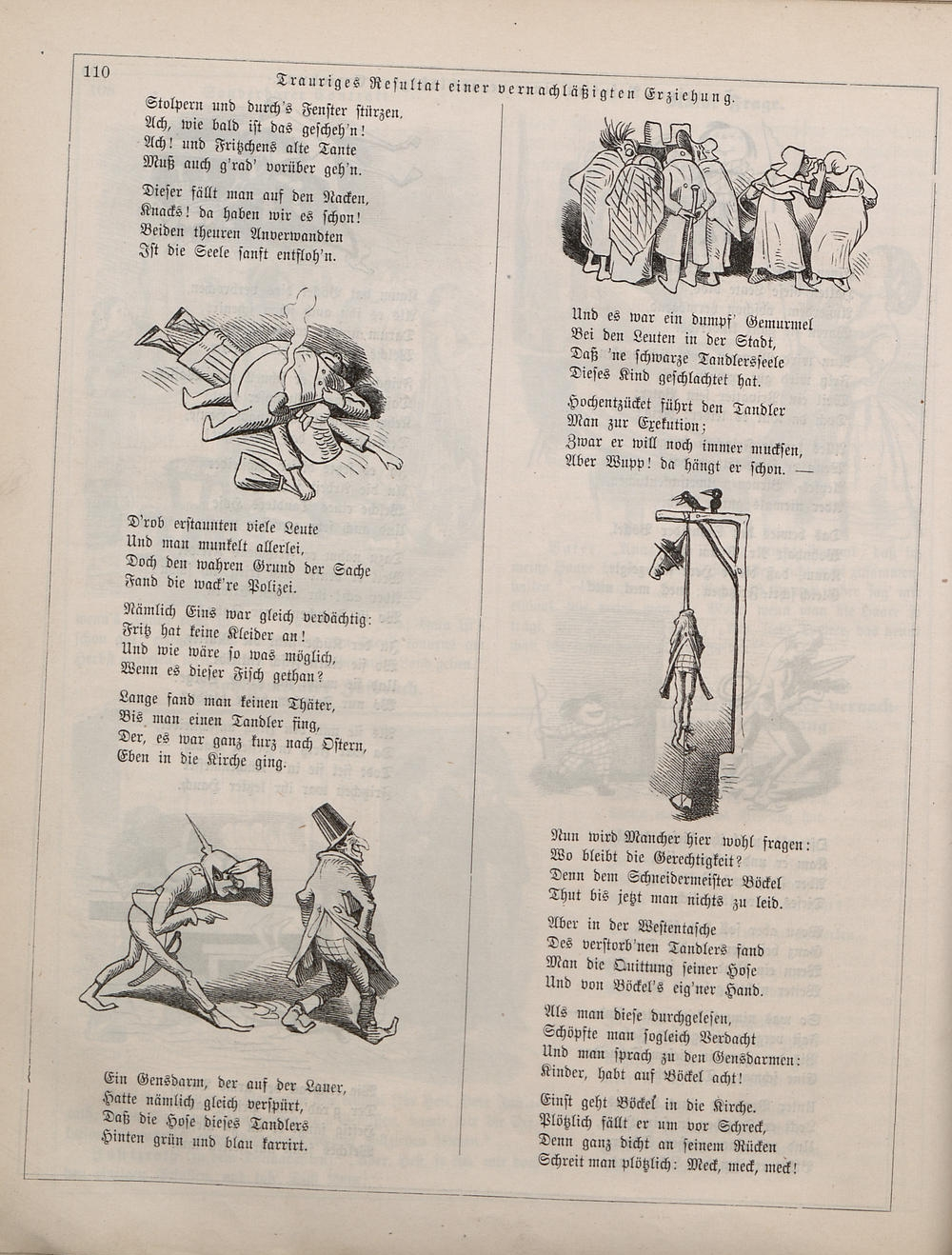
Page from 1860, illustrated by Wilhelm Busch

The Fliegende Blätter ("Flying Leaves"; also translated as "Flying Pages" or "Loose Sheets") was a German weekly humor and satire magazine appearing between 1845 and 1944 in Munich. Many of the illustrations were by well-known artists such as Wilhelm Busch, Count Franz Pocci, Hermann Vogel, Carl Spitzweg, Julius Klinger, Edmund Harburger, Adolf Oberländer and others. It was published by Verlag Braun & Schneider, a company belonging to the wood engraver Kaspar Braun and illustrator Friedrich Schneider. Aimed at the German bourgeoisie, it reached a maximum circulation of c.95,000 copies by 1895. It merged in 1928 with a competitor, the Meggendorfer-Blätter and was published until 1944 as Fliegende Blätter und Meggendorfer-Blätter by the Schreiber-Verlag in Esslingen am Neckar.

== Sample illustrations ==
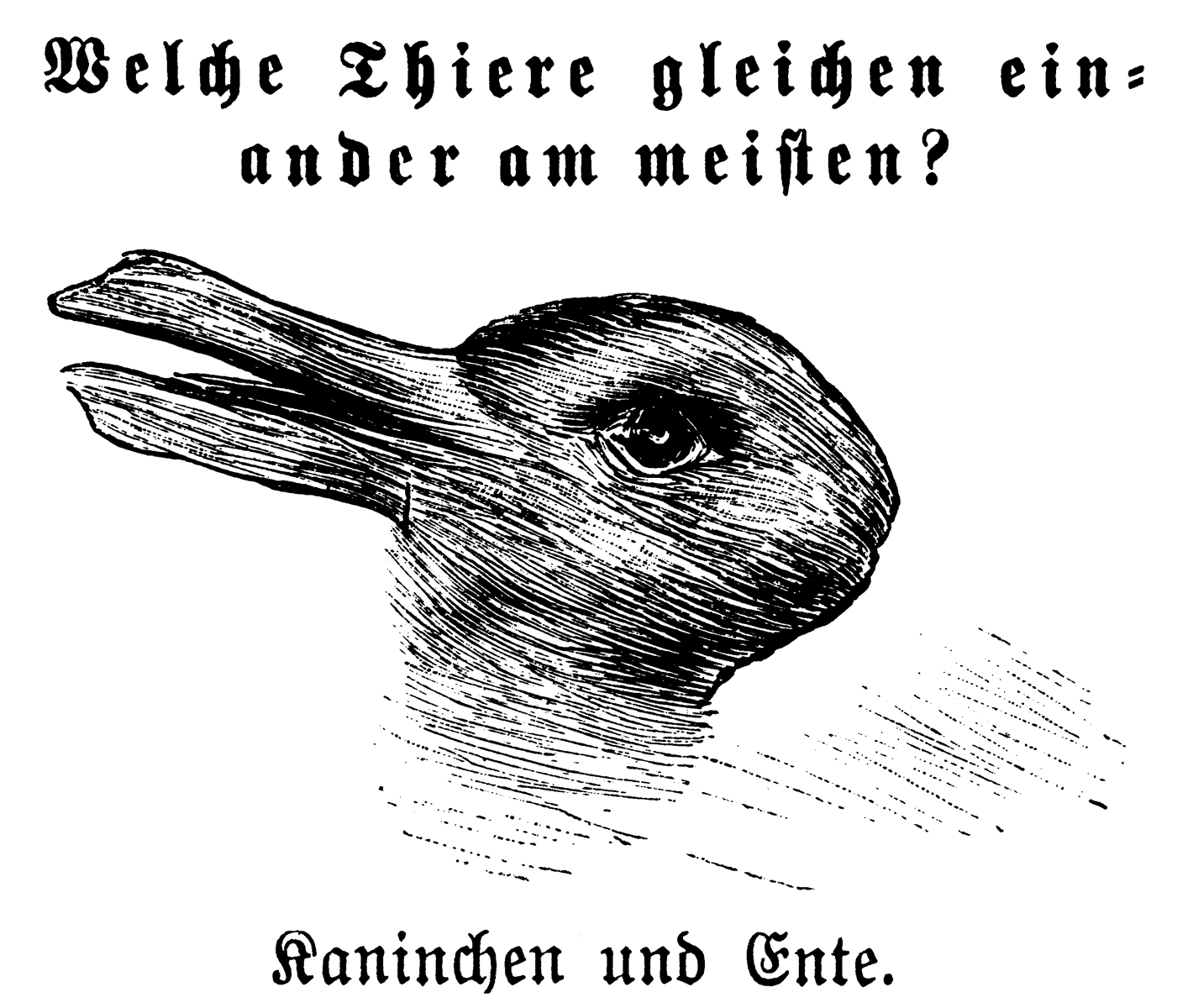
The first known instance of the rabbit–duck illusion, anonymous illustration from the 23 October 1892 issue

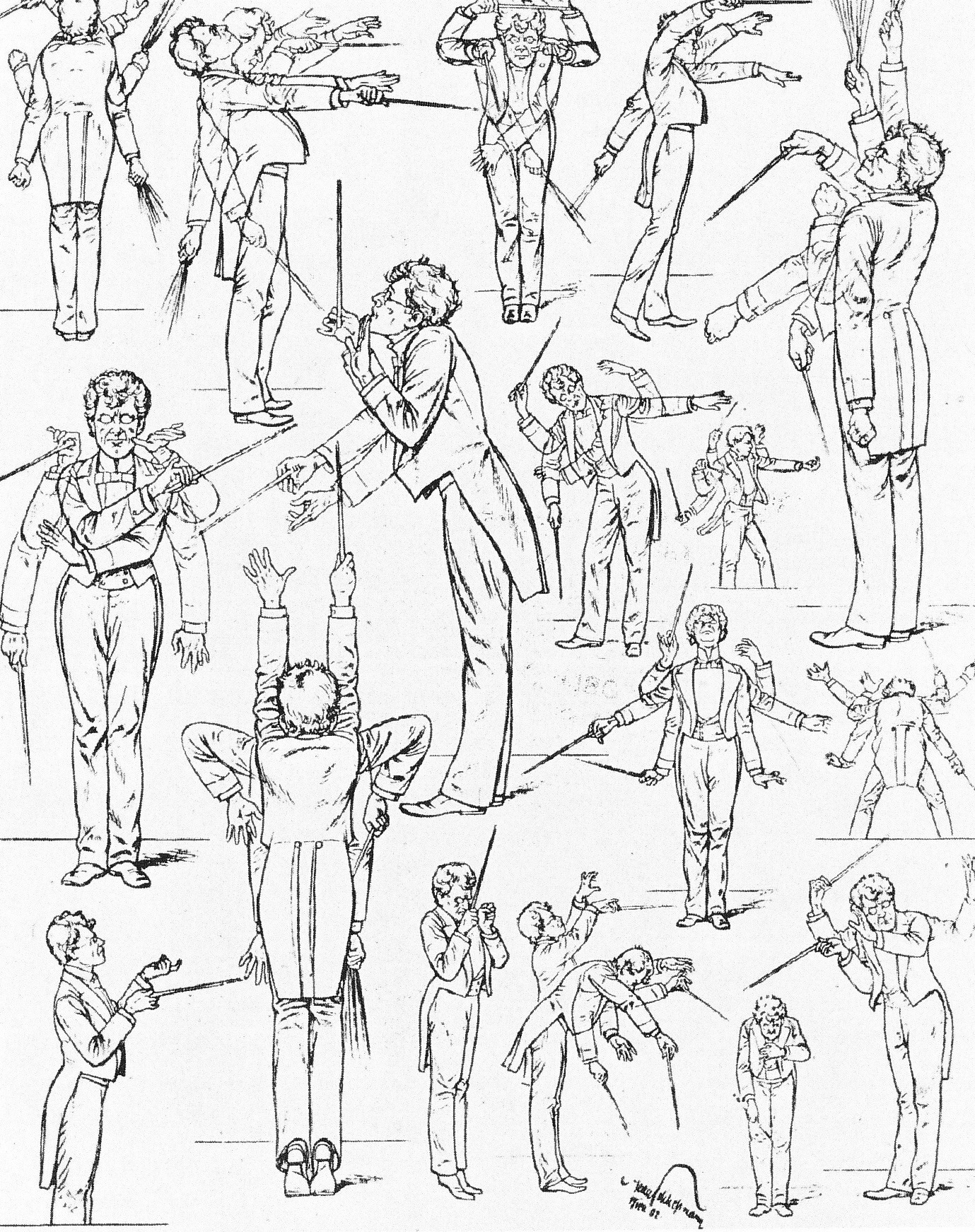
Mahler conducting by Hans Schließmann, 1901

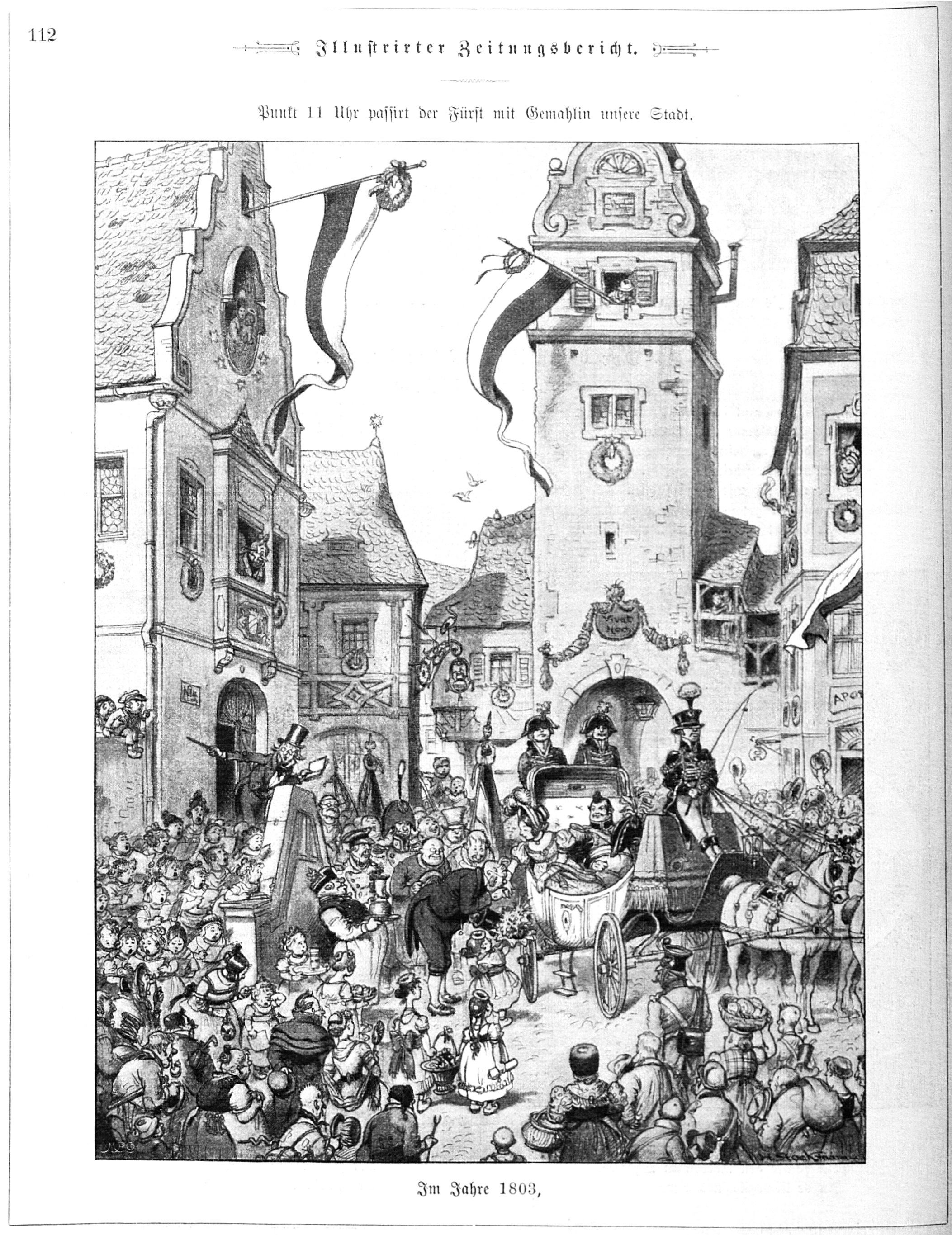
Illustration by Hermann Stockmann, 1903

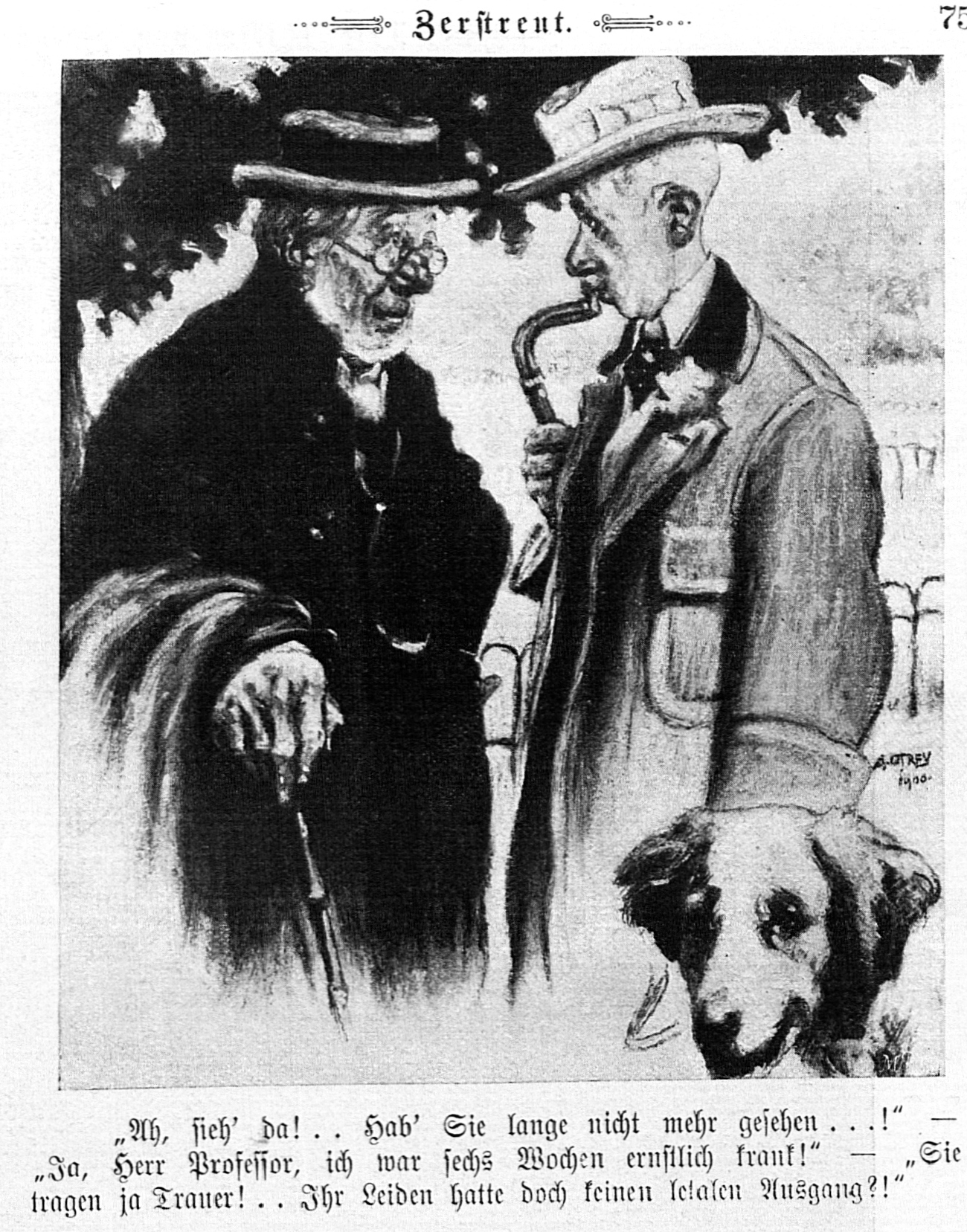
Illustration by Alexander Otrey (1877–1939), 1903
