= Edward H. Hutchins =

Book publisher

- Born: Tucson, Arizona
- Education: University of Arizona, M.S. Government Service
- Occupations: Book artist, publisher, paper engineer, artist
- Partner: Steve Warren
- Website: artistbooks.com

Edward "Ed" Hutchins is known as "one of the most inventive book artists" and proprietor of Editions, a small press publisher of artists' book multiples, since 1989.

== Biography ==
In the 1980s, Hutchins started taking classes at The Center for Book Arts in New York City. In 1996, he enrolled in the Fine Arts graduate program at Purchase College to study book arts. Paper engineers and artists who have influenced him include Vojtěch Kubašta, Ruth Tilden (author, What's in the Fridge?: A Tasty Pop-up ABC), and Julian Wehr.

Hutchins's subscribes to a "guerrilla bookmaking" philosophy where "everyone is a maker of books because everyone has a story to tell". Books are made with materials at hand and simple skills available to anyone interested.

The books Hutchins creates often involve innovative styles such as books made using a single sheet of paper folded multiple times, tunnel books that allow the reader to "see through" the book, and flexagons, where pages fold into themselves to create new pages. Anne Anninger, Houghton Library, Philip Hofer Curator of Printing & Graphic Arts, collected Hutchins' books for Harvard's library and has said "...Hutchins' little books made the point: begin with a deep concern for human issues and a strong sense of empathy, and express them in a few simple words; add funky imagery; present the whole in a unique, humorous, and expressive structure, which requires years of experience yet the irreverence of youth... Impossible, you say? Not for Ed Hutchins."

In 1989, Hutchins started Editions, a press for publishing limited editions of art books.

In 1998, he founded Book Central, a catalog of the most useful how-to books for bookbinding, structures, papermaking, printing, pop-ups, paper engineering and creating books with children. The catalog business was later sold in 2000.

== Books ==
Books by Hutchins include:

- Album, 1997, an autobiographical tetra-tetra-flexagon (four edges, four faces book).
- Do Sit Down, 1992, book's text can be pulled from seat cushion of an actual miniature chair.
- Explosive Politics: Contrasting Views of Civic Discourse, 2016, a book within a firecracker case.
- Gay Myths, 1993 and 2002, sewn pamphlet with multiple foldouts and social commentary. Inspired by the 1993 March on Washington for Gay Rights.
- Grandma's Closet, 1991, tunnel book.
- Mystery of the Magic Box, 1995, a single sheet of paper is cut and folded into 56 pages and box cover.
- Twisted, 1992, twisting the book covers automatically advance or unfold the book pages.
- Voces de México, 2000, rotating flexagon with Mexican sayings and quotations.

== Awards ==
- Honorable Mention, "Exhibition Catalogues" category, American Association of Museums, 1996 for The Mystery of the Magic Box.

== Exhibitions ==
Year	Title	Location	Notes
2003	"Design, Construct, Engage: Artist books by Edward H. Hutchins.”	The exhibit travelled to Florida Atlantic University, The Public Library of Cincinnati, the University of Utah and the Minnesota Center for the Book	60 works included.
2002	"Gadzooks, Pages Alive! Editioned Artist Books"	Park Row Gallery, Chatam, New York	
1998	"Toying with Books, Playing with Conventions. Artist books by Edward H. Hutchins"	UCLA University Research Library	
1996	"Flights of Fancy – The Books of Edward H. Hutchins"	Resnick Gallery, Brooklyn Campus, the Long Island University	Constance Woo, curator
1995	"Science and the Artist's Book"	Smithsonian Institution Libraries	Carol Barton and Diane Shaw, co-curators. Hutchins' piece, Moving the Obstinate, included.
1992	"Love and Romance"	The Center for Book Arts, New York City	1992 Artist Members Exhibition by 22 artists, including Hutchins and Claire Van Vliet.
1991	"Economy of Space"	The Center for Book Arts, New York City	3 works included. 48 artists, including Marilyn R. Rosenberg. All books were under four inches.

== Book contributions ==
- The Art of the Pop-up, by Jean-Charles Trebbi, 2014. Pattern of a spiral petal book by Hutchins is on pages 156–157.
- Making Handmade Books: 100+ Bindings, Structures and Forms by Alisa Golden, 2010. Hutchins' Album and Voces de México and pictured. Instructions for making tetra-tetra-flexagon and cross-flexgons are included on pages 130, 132–133.
- Paper Engineering: 3-D Design Techniques for a 2-D Material by Natalie Avella, 2009. Profile on Ed Hutchins on pages 148-153, including photos of six artists' books.
- Playing with Pop-ups: The Art of Dimensional, Moving Paper Designs by Helen Hiebert, 2014. Ed Hutchins' books are featured on page 106.
