= Edward Hutchins =

Edward Hutchins may refer to:

- Edward H. Hutchins (born 1948), book artist and publisher
- Edward John Hutchins (1809–1876), English politician and railway director
