= Colette Fu =

American book artist, photographer, and paper engineer

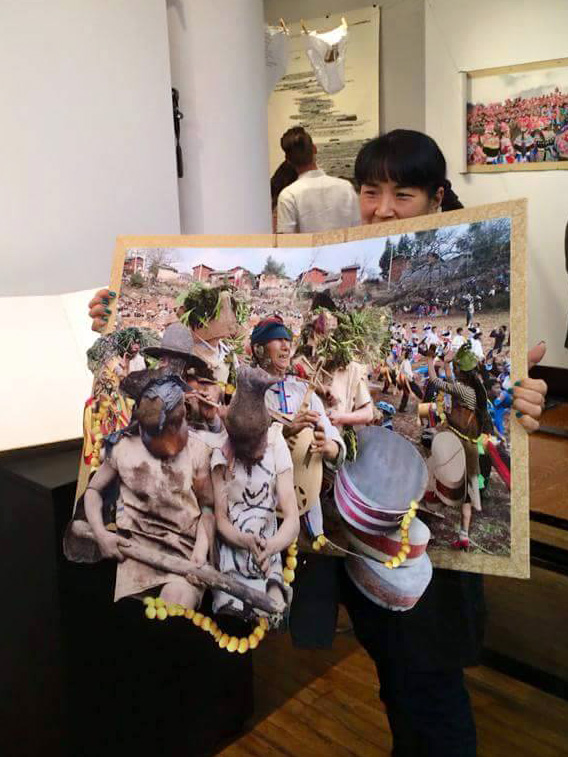
- Colette Fu at the Axi Fire Festival, 2015
- Born: Princeton, New Jersey
- Education: Rochester Institute of Technology; Virginia Commonwealth University; Yunnan Nationalities University; University of Virginia
- Occupations: Book artist, paper engineer, artist, photographer, teacher
- Mother: Pearl Fu
- Awards: Fulbright Scholarship, Leeway Transformation Award, En Foco New Award, Puffin Foundation Artist Grant, Society of Photographic Education Achievement Scholarship, Virginia Museum of Fine Arts Artist Fellowship
- Website: colettefu.com

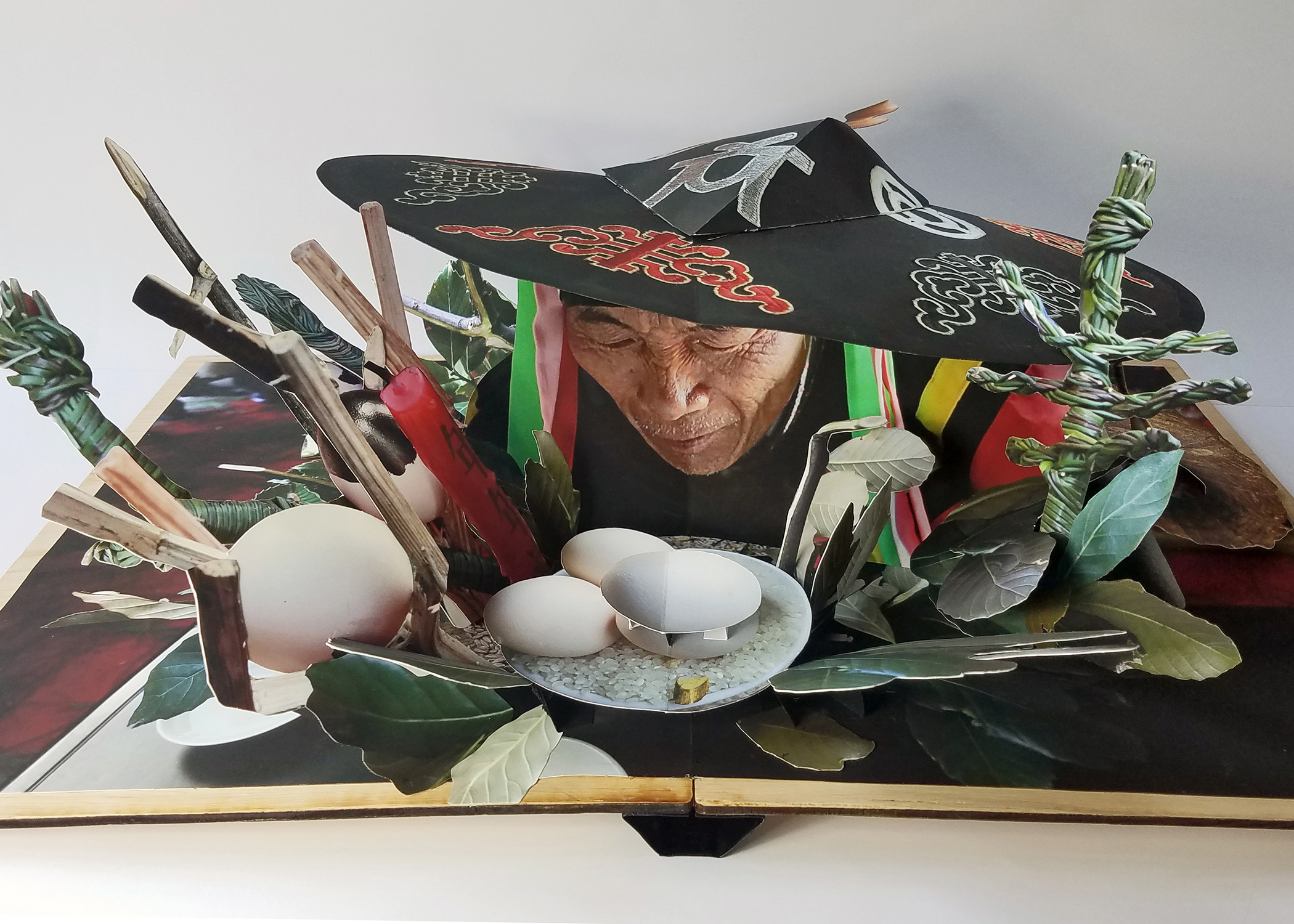
For Our Ancestors at the Center for Emerging Visual Artists

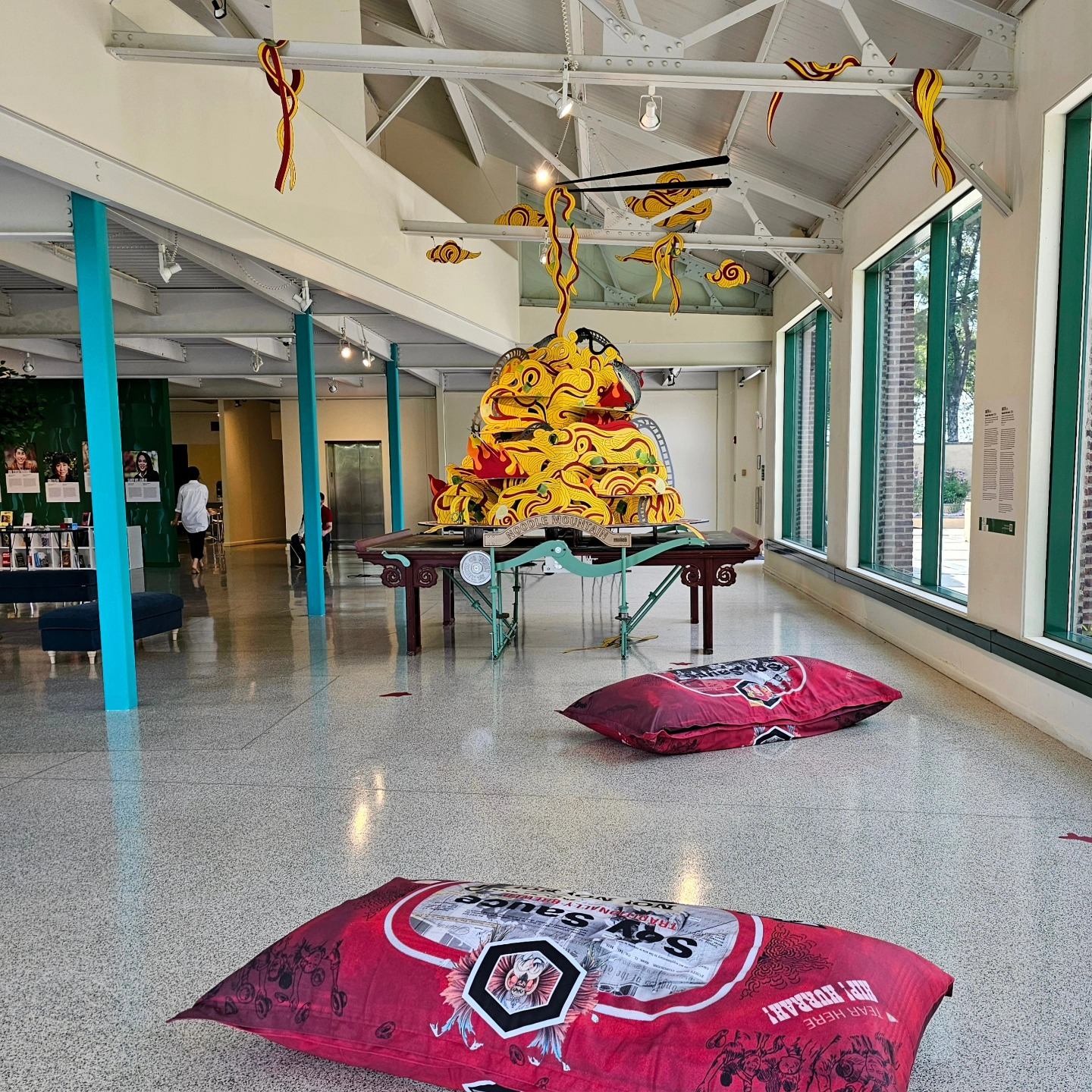
Noodle Mountain at Grounds for Sculpture

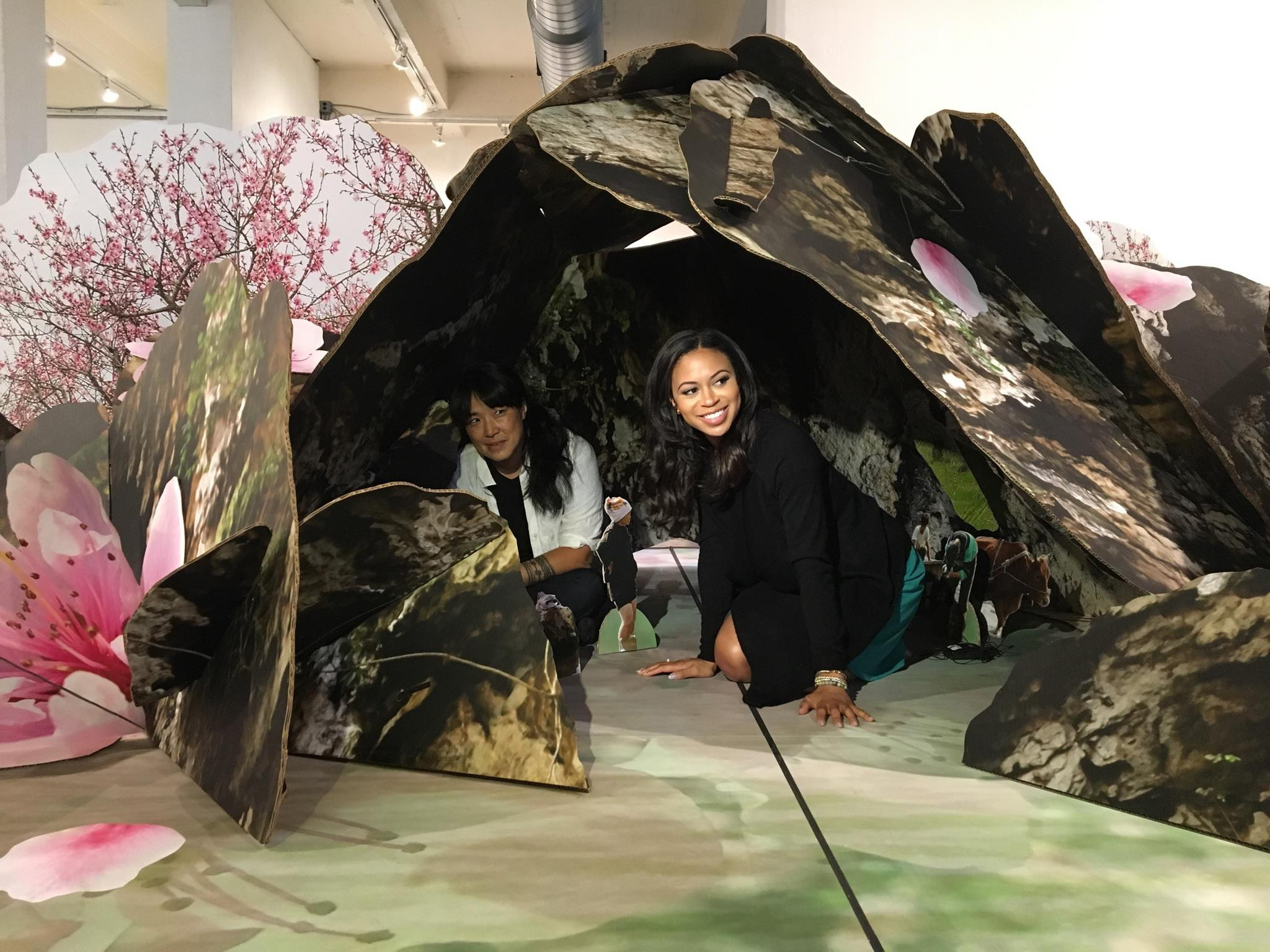
Alex, from Good Day Philadelphia, visits Tao Hua Yuan Ji

Colette Fu is an American photographer, book artist and paper engineer known for creating pop-up books, especially on a large scale, from her photographs.

== Early life and education ==
Fu, born in Princeton, New Jersey, is the daughter of mainland Chinese immigrants. After graduating from the University of Virginia, Fu traveled to China with a student tour and shortly returned for three years to teach English and, later, to study Mandarin and art in Yunnan Province. Fu traveled throughout Yunnan, where her mother, member of the Nuosu Yi community, was born, photographing various people in ethnic dress. After returning to the United States, Fu studied photography at Virginia Commonwealth University and Rochester Institute of Technology, where she began collaging images into detailed hyperreal fantasy scenarios.

== Career ==
She teaches pop-up courses and community workshops at art centers, universities and institutions internationally. Her large-scale, three-dimensional pop-up books feature photographic images which extend towards the viewer for many layers. During an artist residency in Shanghai, Fu designed China's largest pop-up book.

Pop-up and flap books originally illustrated sociological ideas and scientific principles; she constructs her own books on how our selves relate to society today. In 2008, Fu was awarded a Fulbright Fellowship to create a pop-up book of the 25 ethnic minority groups residing in Yunnan Province, China, from where the artist's mother's family descends. 25 of 55 minority tribes of China reside in Yunnan and comprise less than 9% of the nation's population, with the Han representing the majority. She uses her artistic skills to spread knowledge and provide a brief portrait of their existence.

Fu's well-received pop-up book series include:

- Haunted Philadelphia explores the psychology of fear and spookiness in locations around the city, such as Fort Mifflin, Rodin Museum, Academy of Music and the Philadelphia State Hospital at Byberry.
- We Are Tiger Dragon People, started in 2008, is a series of pop-up books showcasing the diversity of ethnic minority communities in Yunnan Province in southwestern China. The books feature aspects of the local culture: festivals, clothing, dance, folklore, deities, and people.
- Tao Hua Yuan Ji, created at the Philadelphia Photo Arts Center, is the World's Largest Photo Book measuring 13.8 x 21 feet, and 5 feet high. People could enter into the pop-up book.
- Noodle Mountain at Grounds for Sculpture.

Fu's commercial clients for paper engineering have included LVMH, Vogue China, Canon Asia, Greenpeace and Children's Medical Center in Texas.

Fu's books are in collections including Library of Congress, Getty Research Institute, Yale University, Metropolitan Museum of Art and National Museum of Women in the Arts.

== Technique ==
On a visit to her local Borders Book Store, Fu stumbled onto Robert Sabuda's Wizard of Oz pop-up book and was instantly enamored. Fu then learned paper engineering mechanics by reverse engineering pop-up books purchased on eBay while attending numerous artist residencies.

Each of Fu's pop-up books are a single, large format spread. A good variety of her pop-up books are based on her experiences traveling to China and learning about her culture. Fu creates a digital collage using her own photographs on her computer, then "works on the pop-up mechanisms that cause her composition to explode from the page." Fu does all the work herself, including printing and binding, and each pop-up element is cut by hand. Some books include up to 40 photographs and measure 3 x 4.5 feet. An average pop-up can take up to four weeks to design and build.

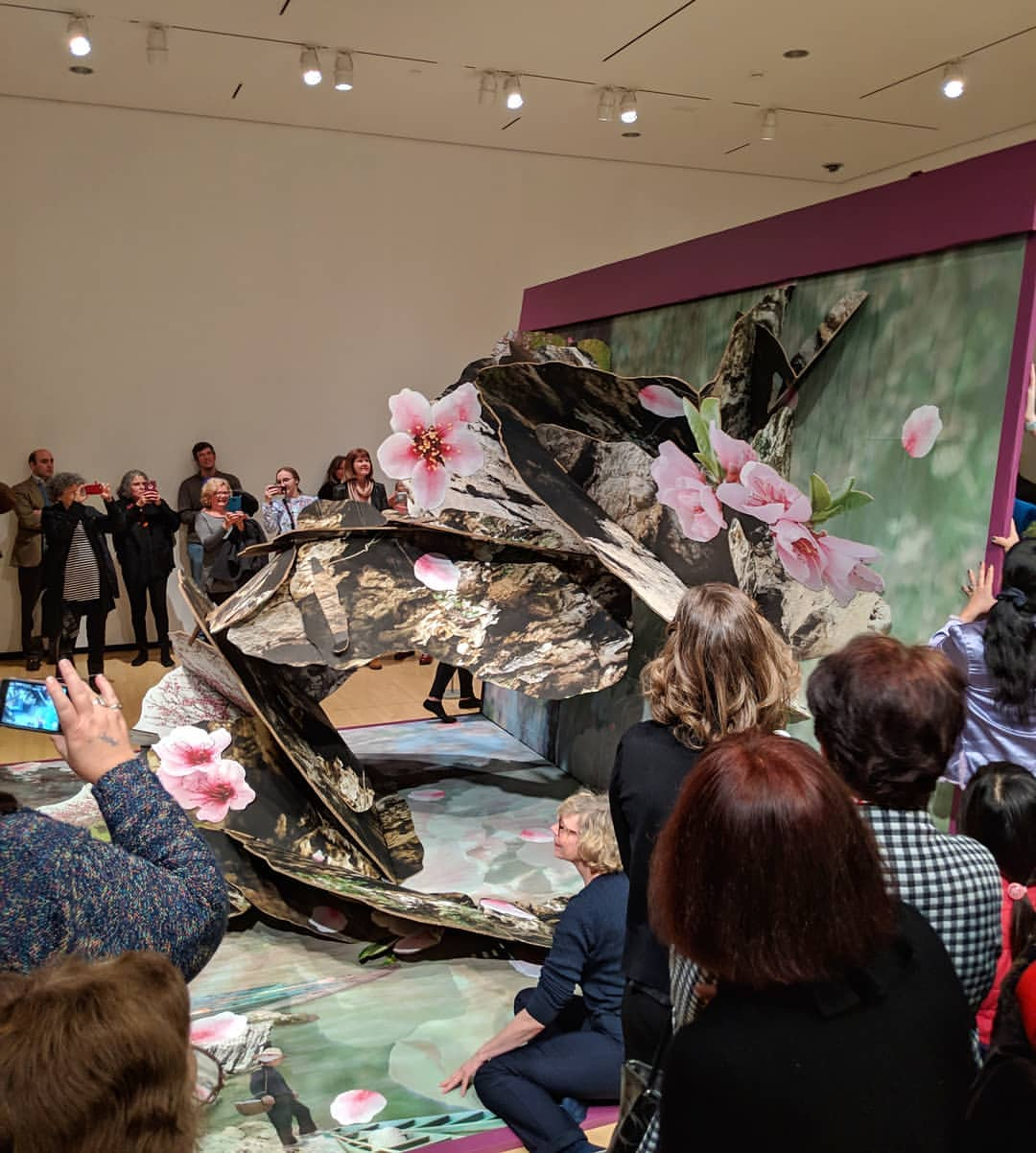
Tao Hua Yuan Ji at the Taubman Museum, Roanoke, VA

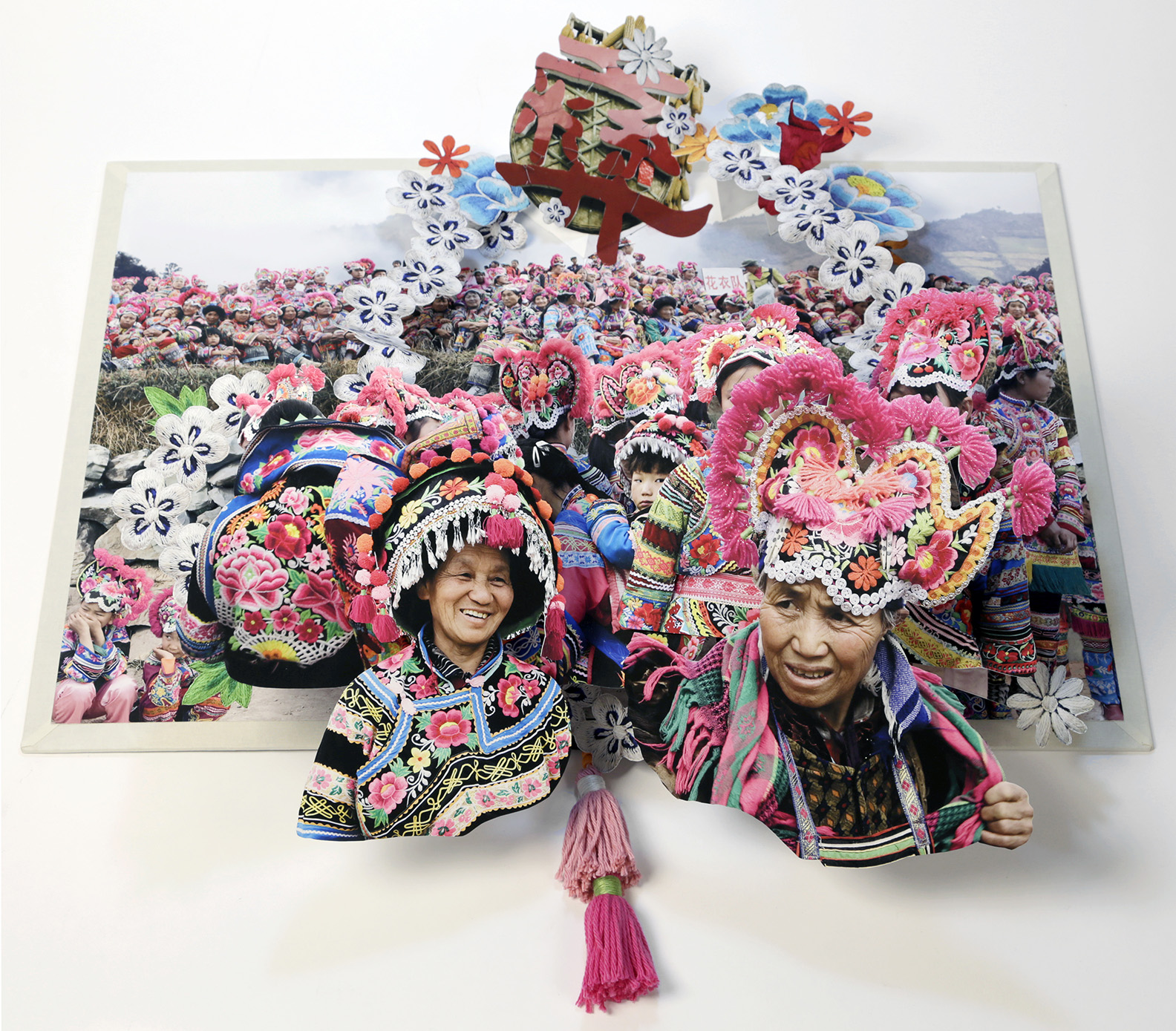
Yi Costume Festival

== Extended study of Chinese minorities ==
Colette Fu's projects have taken her across the globe and can take years to fully materialize. With the help of a Fulbright fellowship, a recent endeavor found her in southwest Yunnan Province, China, where she studied the local population, learned about their culture and immersed herself in the daily life of its people. The project took ten years to complete, but resulted in some of Fu's most notable work.

== Exhibitions ==
Year	Title	Location
2023	Wishing Tree	Bainbridge Island Museum of Art, Bainbridge Island, WA
2022	Medium & Message: The Book Art of Colette Fu and Lothar Meggendorfer	The Rosenbach, Philadelphia, PA
2021	What the Butterfly Dragon Taught Me: Dimensional Stories in Paper	Center for Book Arts, NYC
2019	We are Tiger Dragon People	Taubman Museum of Art, Roanoke, VA
2018	We are Tiger Dragon People	Phillips Museum of Art at Franklin and Marshall College
2017	Tao Hua Yuan Ji: Source of the Peach Blossoms	Philadelphia Photo Arts Center
2016	Wanderer/Wonderer: The Pop-up Books of Colette Fu (catalog) Bold Broadsides and Bitsy Books	The National Museum of Women in the Arts, Washington, DC
2015	Land of Deities	Georgetown University, Washington, DC
2013	We are Tiger Dragon People & Photo Binge	Jaffe Center for Book Arts, Boca Raton, FL
2011	Haunted Philadelphia	Philadelphia Athenaeum, Philadelphia, PA

== Awards ==
- Joan Mitchell Painters & Sculptors Grant
- Yaddo Fellowship, 2018
- Meggendorfer Artist Book Prize, 2018
- MacDowell Colony Fellowship, 2017
- Pennsylvania Council on the Arts, Project Stream Fund, 2017, 2009
- Center for Emerging Visual Artists, Visual Arts Fellowship, 2015
- Swatch Art Peace Hotel Residency, 2014
- Leeway Transformation Award, 2013
- Puffin Foundation Artist Grant 2021, 2015, 2010, 2003
- Smack Mellon Hot Picks, 2010
- Independence Foundation Artist Fellowship, 2010
- Fulbright Research Fellowship to China, 2008
- Fulbright Scholarship, 2008
- Virginia Commission for the Arts, Artist Fellowship, 2007
- En Foco New Works Award, 2004
- Virginia Museum of Fine Arts Artist Fellowship, 2004
- Puffin Foundation, Artist Grant, 2003
- Society of Photographic Education Achievement Scholarship, 2002

== Book contributions ==
- Making Books with Kids: 25 Paper Projects to Fold, Sew, Paste, Pop, and Draw by Esther K. Smith, 2016. Fu's Spinning Flower Pop-Up, page 83.
- Playing with Pop-Ups: The Art of Dimensional, Moving Paper Designs by Helen Hiebert, 2014. Fu's pattern for a pop-up version of Philadelphia's First Bank of the United States is on pages 60–63.
