= Julian Wehr =

American artist

- Born: Julian Wehrfritz; 30 June 1898; Brooklyn, New York, US
- Died: 25 April 1970 (aged 71); New Smyrna Beach, Florida, US
- Education: Art Students League
- Occupation(s): Paper Engineer, Sculptor, Artist
- Spouse(s): Marguerite West (unknown–1932; divorced); Julie Laubinger (1933–1970; his death)
- Children: 5

Julian Wehr (1898–1970) was known as the "American Master of Animated Books". Around 9 million copies of Wehr's books were sold in the United States and Great Britain, and were translated and sold in France, Germany, and Spain during the 1940s and 1950s.

== Animated and Pop-Up Books ==
Wehr invented and patented the animated children's book that contained moveable paper parts using tabs, commonly read by children in the 1940s, 50s and 60s. An animated pop-up book consists of three elements: a story, colored illustrations of the text, and two or more animated illustrations with their movement mechanisms working between a double page.

=== Selected bibliography ===
Wehr created over 30 animated books, including:

- Wehr, Julian; Carroll, Lewis (1945), The Animated Picture Book of Alice in Wonderland., Grosset and Dunlap, OCLC 11319992
- Wehr, Julian; Ernest, Edward; Adomeit, Ruth (1943), Animated Animals, Duenewald Printing Corporation, OCLC 35840161
- Wehr, Julian; Daye, Stephen (1945), Cinderella, Stephen Daye, OCLC 24727462
- Wehr, Julian (1942), The Exciting Adventures of Finnie the Fiddler, Cupples & Leon Company, OCLC 28641057
- Wehr, Julian (1943), The Gingerbread Boy, Duenewald Printing Corporation, OCLC 28194916
- Wehr, Julian; Bannerman, Helen (1943), Little Black Sambo., Duenewald Printing Corporation, OCLC 61141694
- Wehr, Julian; Washington, Irving (1945), Rip Van Winkle, Duenewald Printing Corporation, OCLC 31415064
- Wehr, Julian; Moore, Clement Clarke (1949), The Night Before Christmas, Duenewald Printing Corporation, OCLC 15477917

== Sculptor career ==
Trained at the Art Students League in New York City during the ascendance of Picasso and other modern artists, Wehr's work reflects the abstract renaissance of the 1920s and 1930s. His teacher, the noted artist John French Sloan, was a clear influence on Wehr, eschewing realism for the more authentic abstract communication of feeling and subject matter.

Wehr used a variety of media to communicate his values of racial and social justice, beauty in nature, and the complexity of the human condition. His sculptures in metal painted in simple black and white, such as "Man Woman and Child," articulate the interdependence, yet separateness of the members of the human family at a time when the nuclear family was the ideal of American culture. At a time of the powerful movement for racial equality, Mr. Wehr addressed racial tensions in “Oppression” with its brutal juxtaposition of forms representing the subjection of African Americans in American society. It brings to mind the memorable photographs of police dogs and fire hoses assaulting black schoolchildren in the 1960s. A fire in 1947 destroyed Wehr's studio and two years of sculpting, save for a mahogany head sculpture of an African American man Wehr had sketched once on a New York City Subway trip.

== Collections and Research ==
Mock-ups, patents, legal documents and other materials documenting Wehr's animated book creations are housed at the University of Virginia Albert and Shirley Small Special Collections Library.

In 2002, librarians Dr. Alan Boehm and Roy Ziegler received a $4,000 research grant from the Middle Tennessee State University (MTSU) to "reconstruct the life and accomplishment of a forgotten master of American book artistry and animation," Julian Wehr. "A Julian Wehr Miscellany: Unrecorded Animated Books, Foreign-Language Animated Books, and Other Works" was later published. The MTSU Library, Special Collections' Dimensional and Artist's Books section has a large holding, more than 40, of Wehr animated books.

== Influence ==
The innovative artists' book creator Edward H. Hutchins says one of his early influences was Julian Wehr because of "the multiple movements achieved with a single tab" in his pop-up books.
