= James Malton =

Irish artist (1761–1803)

- Born: 1761
- Died: 28 July 1803 (aged 41–42); Marylebone, United Kingdom
- Resting place: London, United Kingdom
- Occupations: Engraver and watercolourist
- Known for: Engravings and paintings of 18th century life
- Parent: Thomas Malton, the elder (father)
- Family: Thomas Malton (brother)

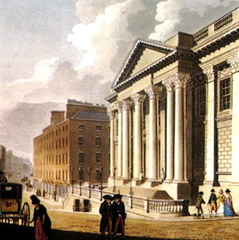
Section of Malton's view of the Royal Exchange, Dublin (late 18th century)

James Malton (1761–1803) was an Irish engraver and watercolourist, who once taught geometry and perspective. He worked briefly as a draughtsman in the office of the celebrated Irish architect James Gandon. He is best known for a series of prints, published in the 1790s as A Picturesque and Descriptive View of the City of Dublin, commonly known as Malton's Views of Dublin.

== Early life ==
Born in 1761,^{[a]} James Malton was the son of the English architectural draughtsman Thomas Malton the elder and brother of Thomas Malton the younger. He moved to Ireland with his father and was living in Dublin by the 1780s. He was employed as a draughtsman in the office of the architect James Gandon for nearly three years during the building of the Custom House (built between 1781 and 1791), but was eventually dismissed.

== Career ==
Malton is first recorded as an artist in 1790, when he sent two drawings to the Society of Artists in London from an address in Dublin. He is best known for A Picturesque and Descriptive View of the City of Dublin, a series of 25 prints originally published between 1792 and 1799. The plates were executed in etching and aquatint by Malton himself, after his own drawings. Each plate was accompanied by descriptive text with a dedication and a vignette in aquatint. Following the completion of the issue of the work in six parts, Malton republished the whole in a bound volume. The coloured prints from this work, which depict many of the new public buildings erected, capture the architectural changes which Dublin underwent in the 18th century.

Between 1792 and 1803, Malton showed 51 drawings of architectural subjects at the Royal Academy. They included 17 views of Dublin in Indian ink and watercolour, mostly depicting the same subjects as his published prints. They were not, however, the original drawings from which the plates were made, often being larger, and with the scenes populated with different figures.

In 1798, he published An Essay on British Cottage Architecture, described in its subtitle as "an attempt to perpetuate on principle, that peculiar mode of building, which was originally the effect of chance". His later publications include a practical treatise on perspective called The Young Painter's Mahlstick (1800), four aquatints after drawings by Francis Keenan, issued as A Select Collection of Views in the County of Devon (1800), and A Collection of Designs for Rural Retreats as Villas Principally in the Gothic and Castle Styles of Architecture (1802).

Malton died "of a brain-fever" in Norton Street, Marylebone, London, on 28 July 1803.

=== Gallery ===
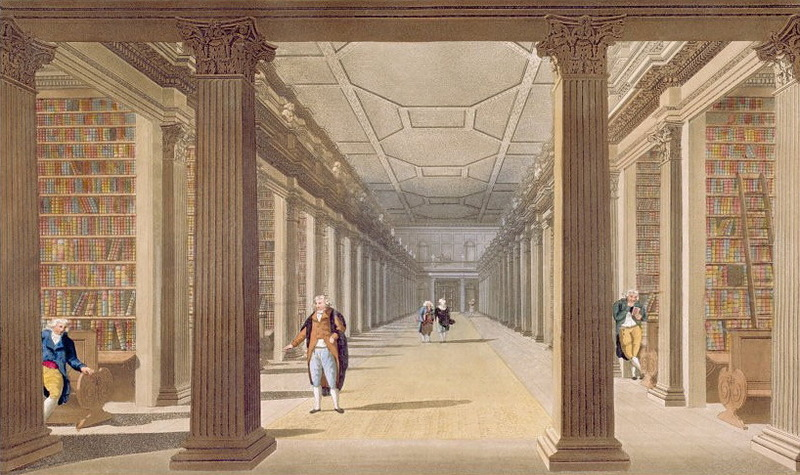
Trinity College Library

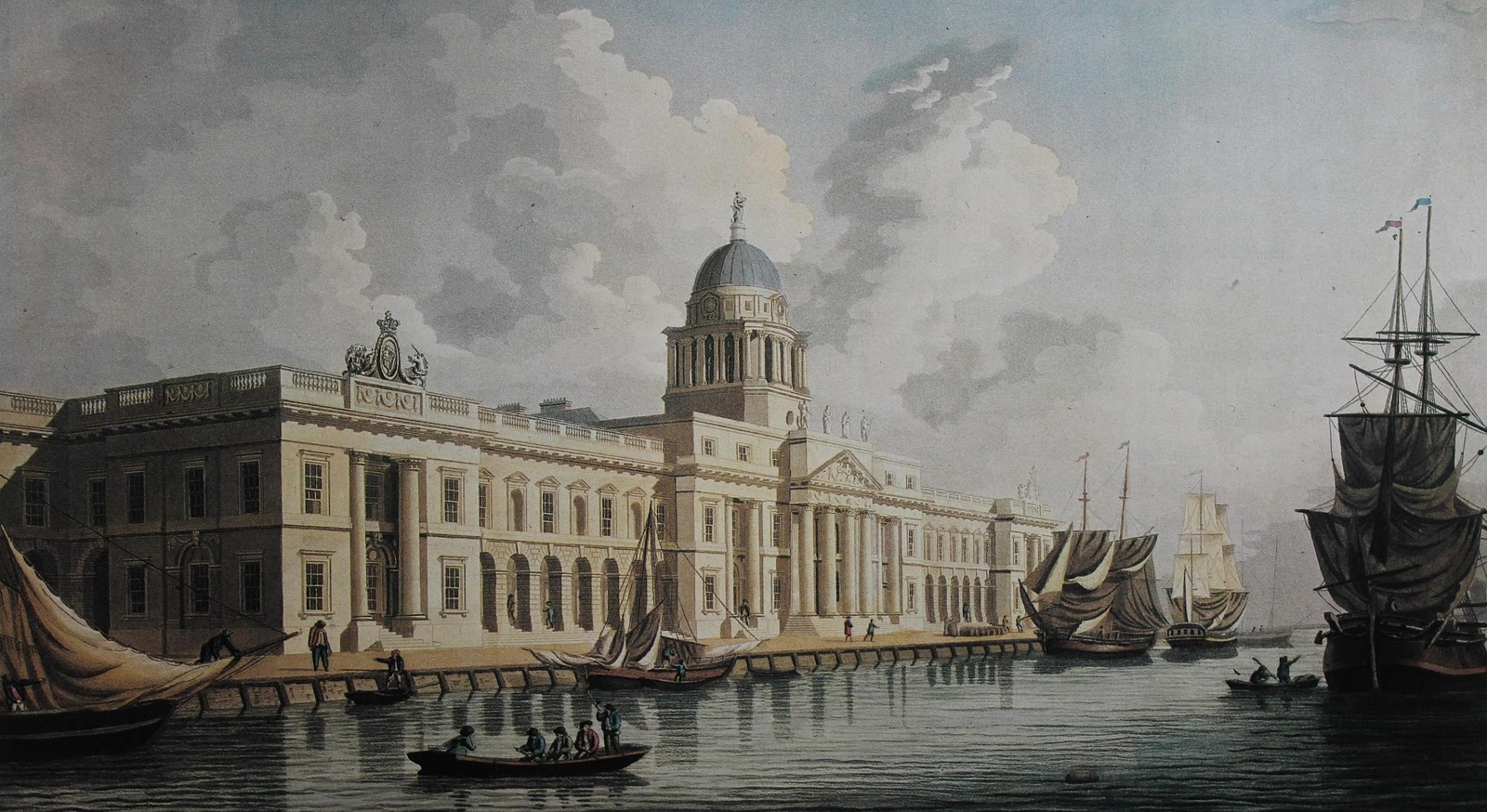
Custom House

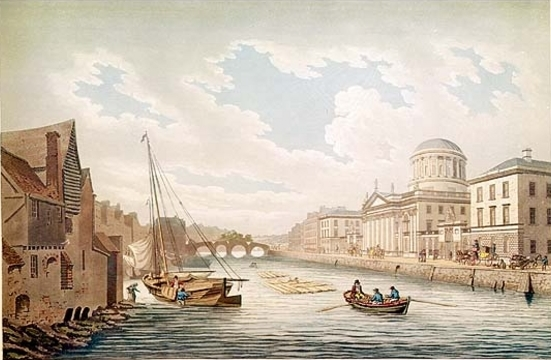
Four Courts and river Liffey

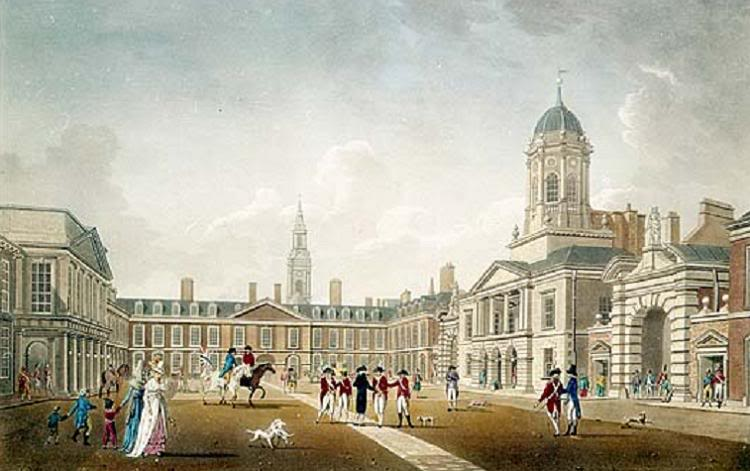
Dublin Castle

Leinster House

View from Capel Street, looking over Essex Bridge

Charlemont House

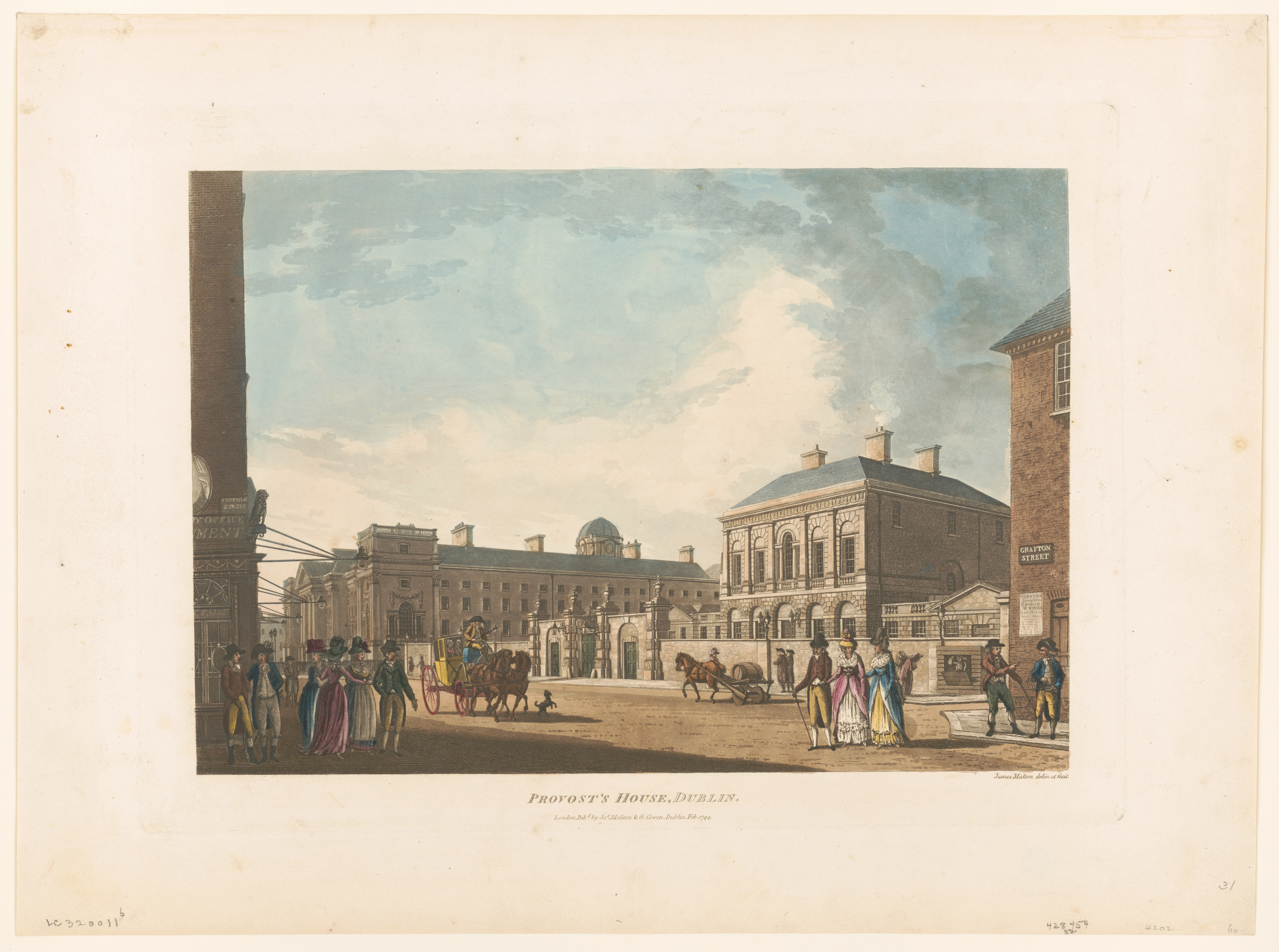
Provost's house

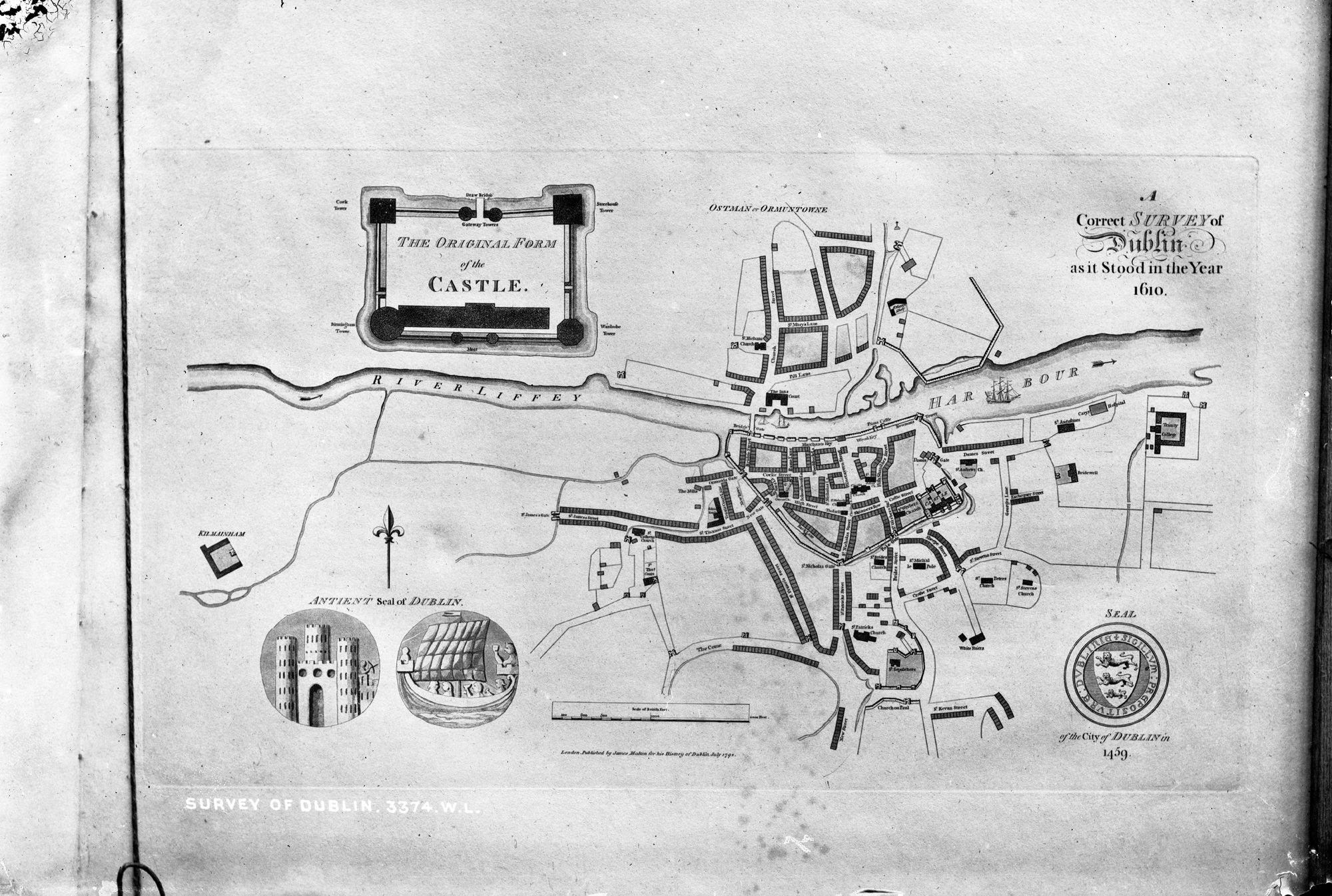
Survey of Dublin

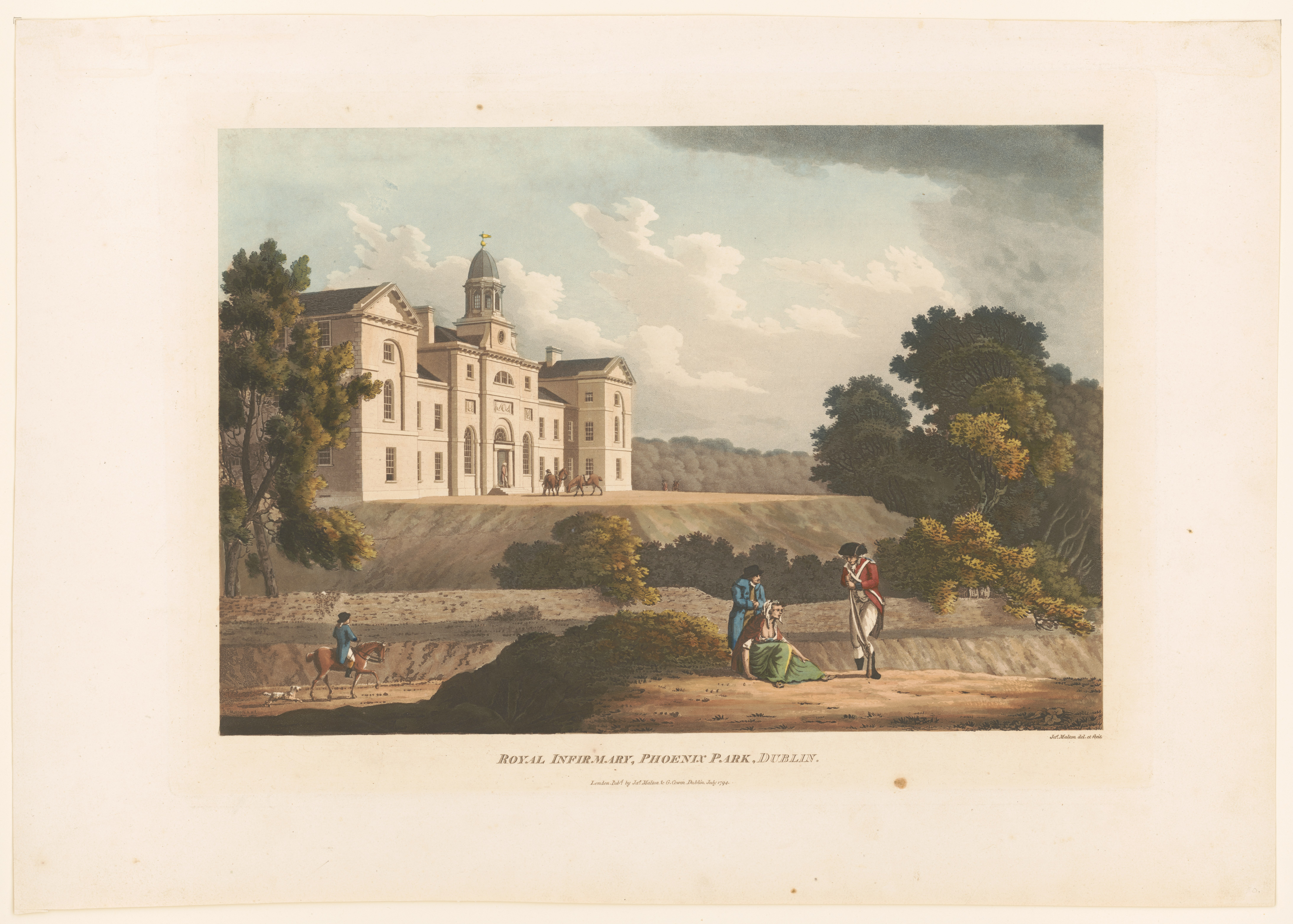
Royal infirmary, Phoenix Park

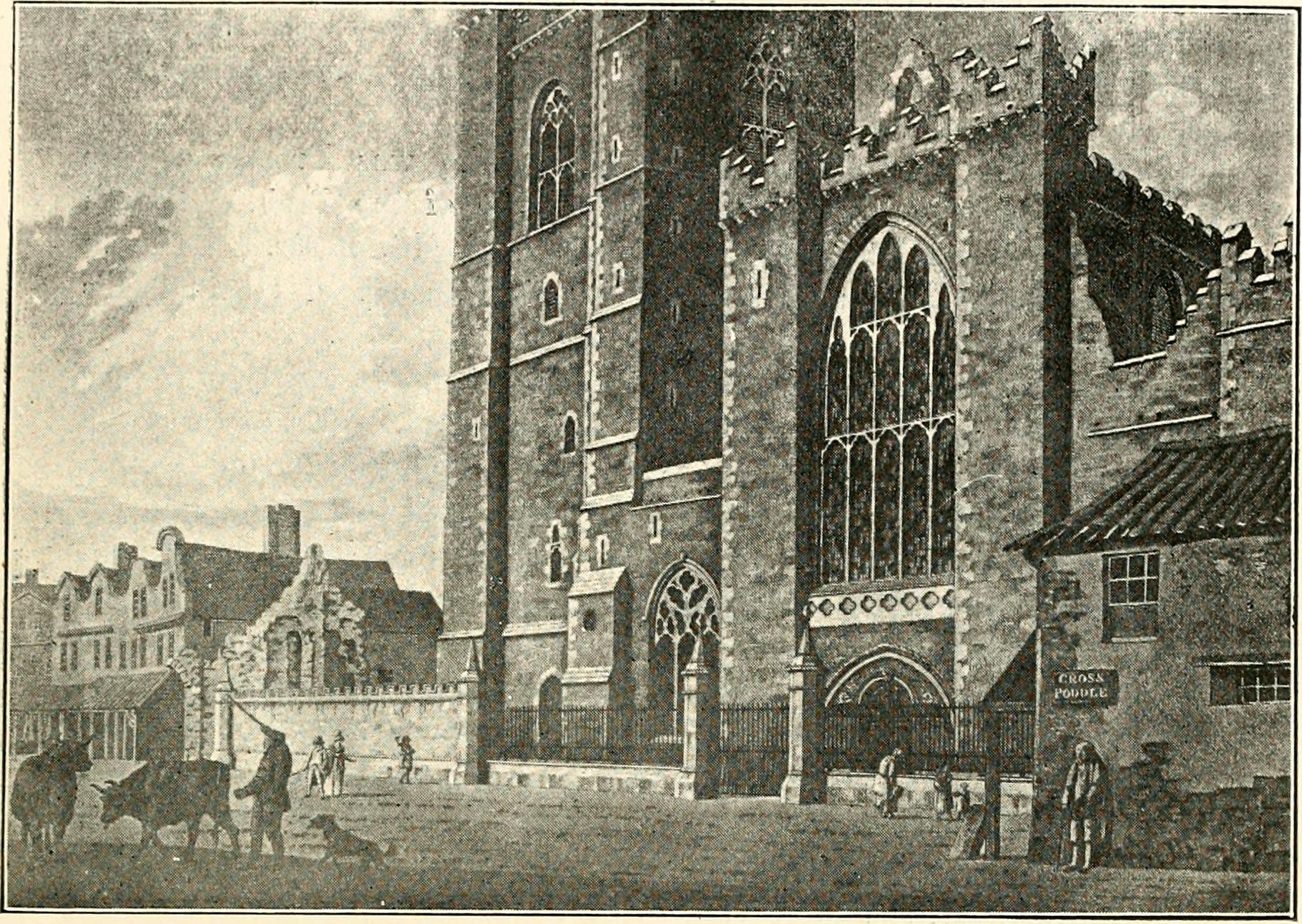
St Patrick's Cathedral

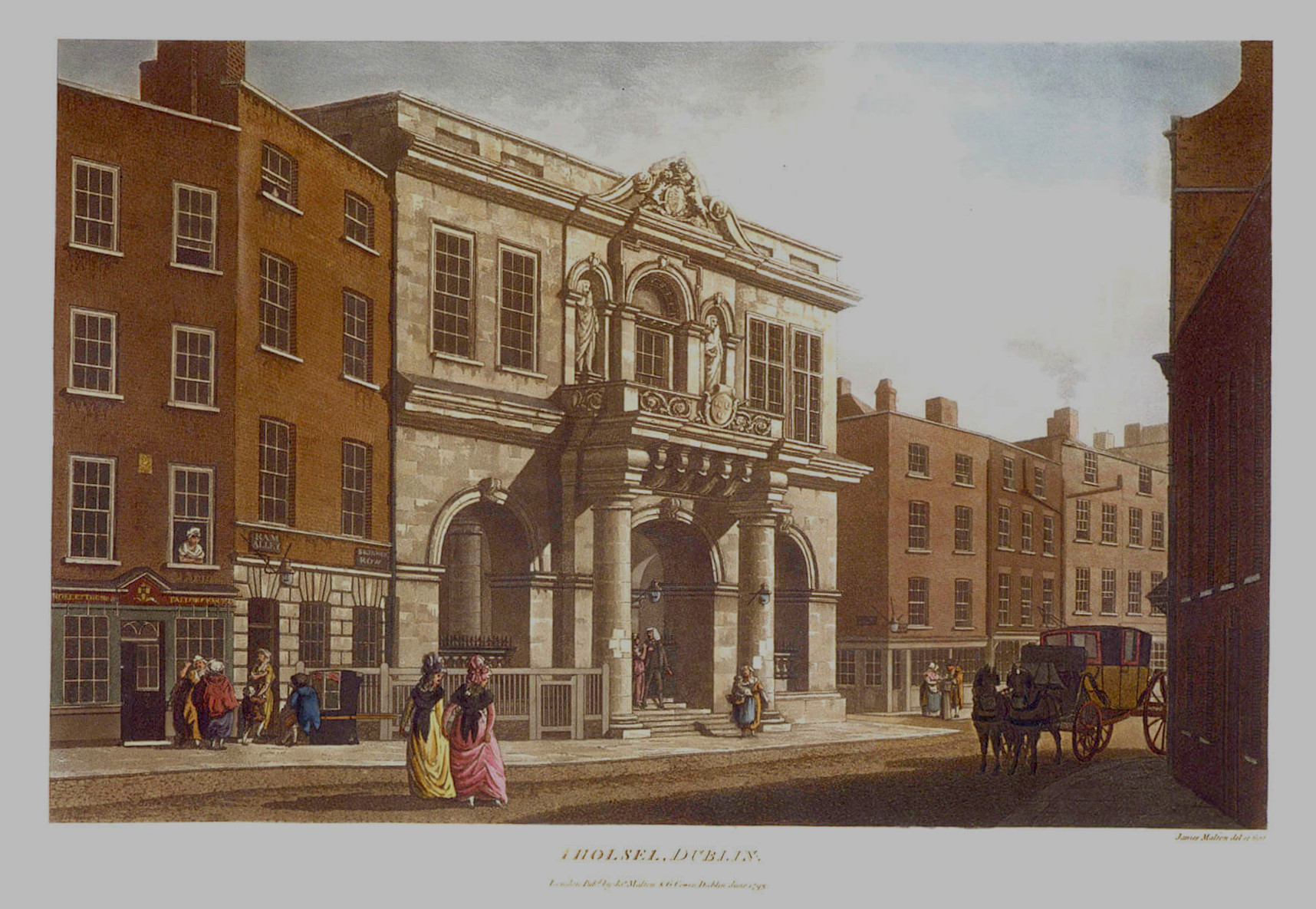
The Tholsel, Dublin

== See also ==
- Samuel Frederick Brocas
- Joseph Tudor

== Footnotes ==
- ^a While most sources give Malton's date of birth as 1761, some (such as the Dublin Historical Record) give 1763.
