= Thomas Malton =

English painter

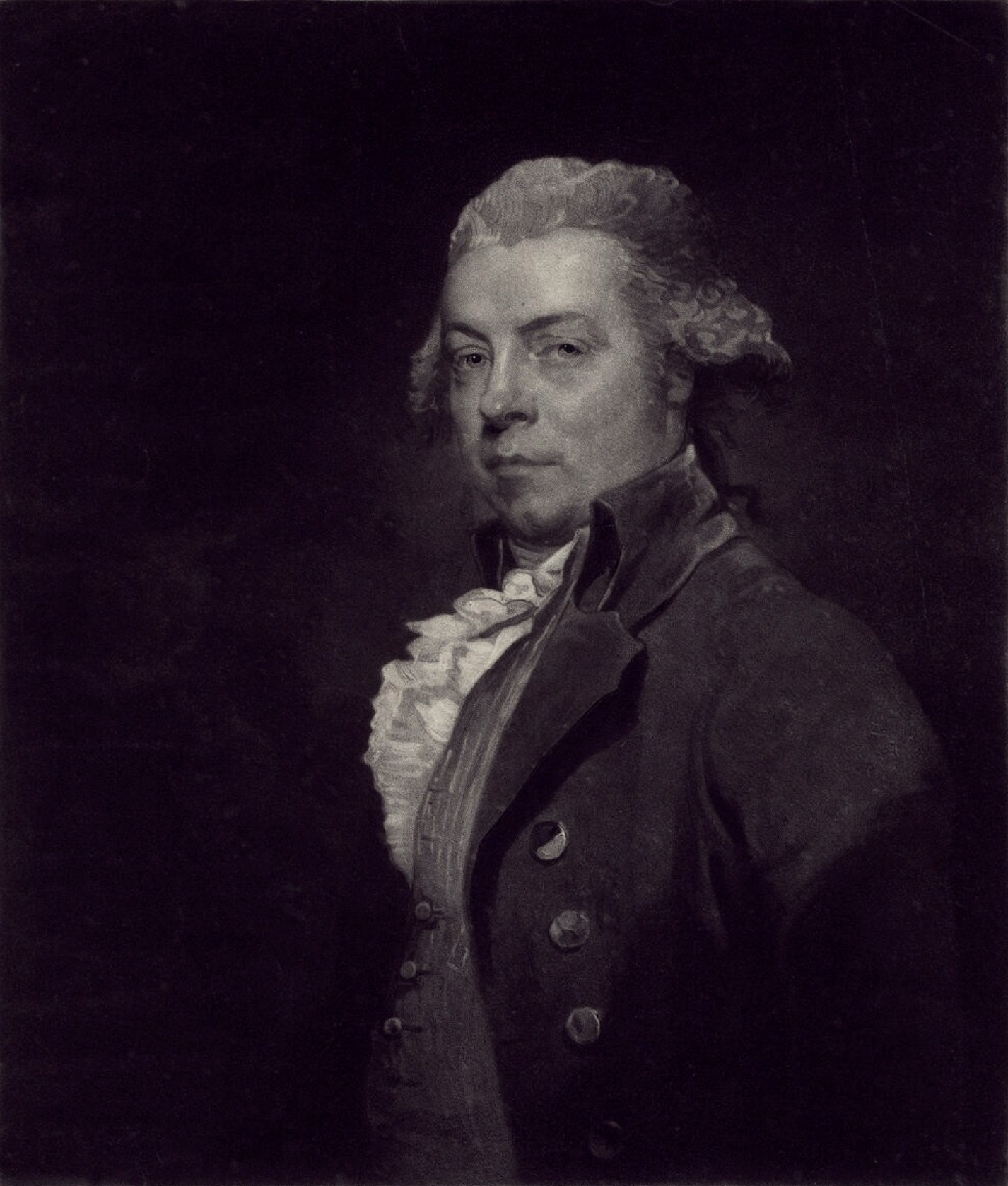
- Engraving by William Whiston Barney after a Gilbert Stuart portrait, 1806
- Born: 1748; London, England
- Died: 7 March 1804 (aged 55–56); London, England

Thomas Malton (1748 – 7 March 1804; also known as Thomas Malton the Younger), was an English painter of topographical and architectural views, and an engraver. J. M. W. Turner and Thomas Girtin were amongst his pupils. He is designated "the younger" to differentiate him from his father Thomas Malton, the Elder.

== Life and work ==
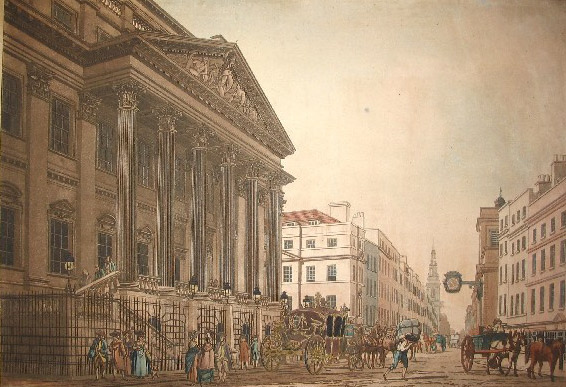
Mansion House, 1793

Malton was born in London, the son of Thomas Malton the Elder (1726–1801), a notable architectural draughtsman and writer on geometry. He was with his father during the latter's residence in Dublin, and then passed three years in the office of James Gandon the architect, in London. In 1774 Malton received a premium from the Society of Arts. He entered the Royal Academy and in 1782 gained a gold medal for his design for a theatre. In 1773 he sent the Academy a view of Covent Garden, and was afterwards a constant exhibitor, chiefly of views of London streets and buildings, drawn in Indian ink and tinted. In these there is little attempt at pictorial effect, but their extreme accuracy in the architectural details renders them of great interest and value as topographical records. They are enlivened with groups of figures, in which Malton is said to have been assisted by Francis Wheatley.

After leaving Ireland, Malton appears to have always lived in London – with the exception of a brief stay at Bath in 1780. From 1783 to 1789 he resided in Conduit Street in London where at an evening drawing class which he held there, he received as pupils, Thomas Girtin and a young J M W Turner, whose father brought him to be taught on perspective. Turner paid tribute to him in later life by saying "my real master was Tom Malton".

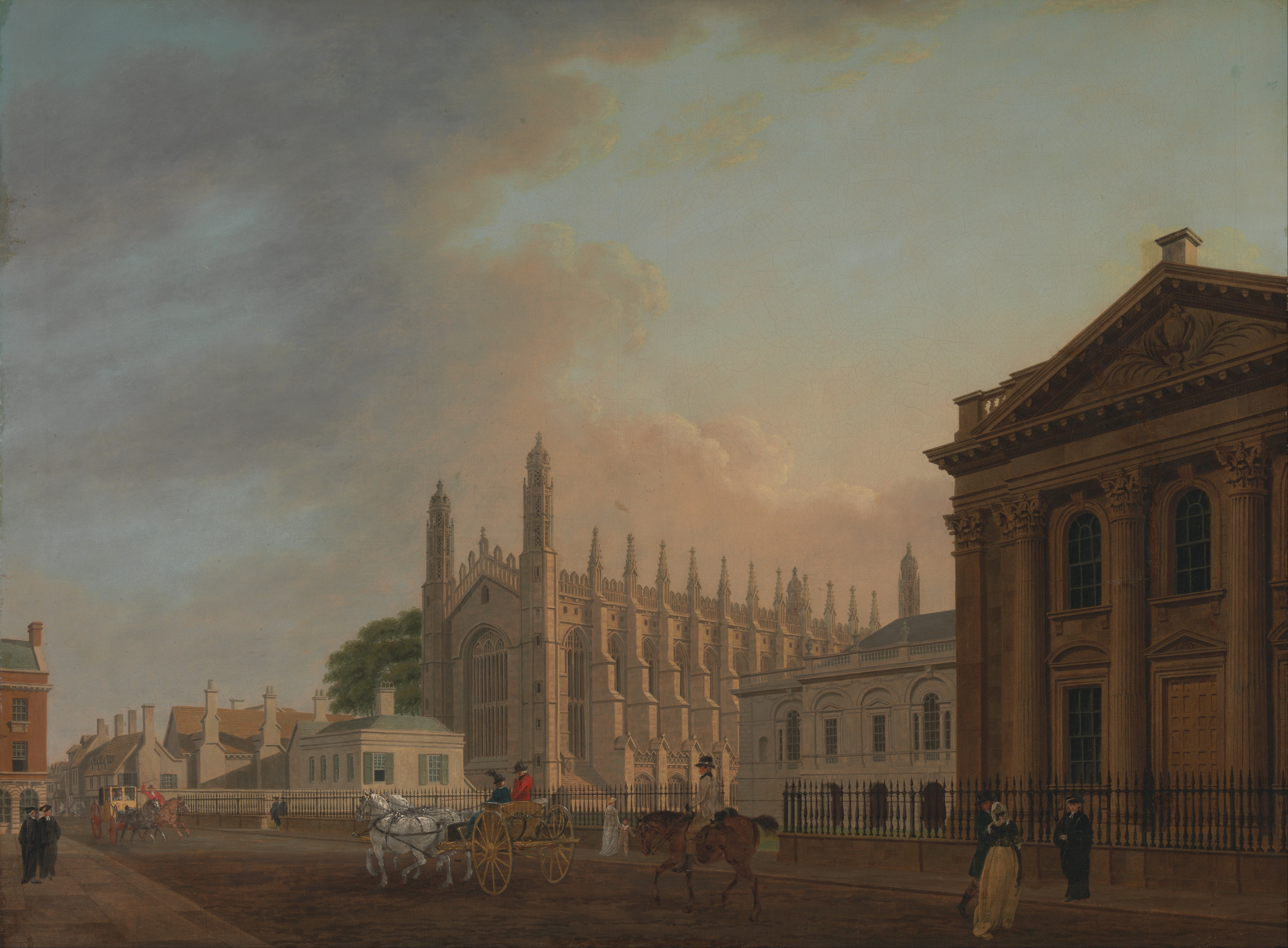
King's Parade, Cambridge, 1798–1799

In 1791 Malton moved to Great Titchfield Street, and finally, in 1796, to Long Acre. He made a few of the drawings for William Watts's Seats of the Nobility and Gentry published in 1779, and executed some large aquatints of buildings in both London and Bath, being one of the first to avail himself of the newly introduced art of aquatinta for the purpose of multiplying copies of his views. He also painted some scenes for the Covent Garden Theatre.

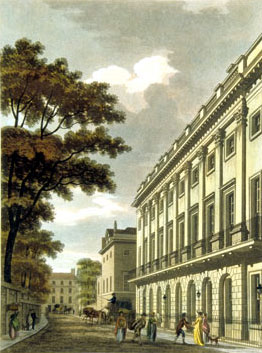
Uxbridge House, 7 Burlington Gardens, London (1801)

In 1792 Malton published the work by which he is now best known, 'A Picturesque Tour through the Cities of London and Westminster', illustrated with a hundred aquatint plates. Between 1798 and 1800 he produced Views from Cambridge, and at the time of his death was engaged upon a similar series of views of Oxford, some of which appeared in parts in 1802, and were reissued with others in 1810.

Thomas Malton the Younger, himself, was painted by American artist Gilbert Stuart.

Malton died in Long Acre, London, on 7 March 1804, leaving a widow and six children.

== Family ==
A portrait of his son Charles as a child was drawn and water-coloured by Sir Thomas Lawrence; it was engraved by F C Lewis. The water colour was recently sold by Christie's. One other version was in the British Museum. Charles (born 1788) was an apprentice of and worked with Sir John Soane on the architectural drawings of the Bank of England. Details in the Sir John Soane Museum show an apology letter from Charles for talking to Soane's servants. After qualifying from study, Charles married an heiress and seems never to have practiced as an architect.

Thomas Malton the Younger's brother James Malton (1761–1803) was also a notable artist, draughtsman and engraver in Ireland and London.

== Disability ==
According to the memoirist William Hickey, who was taught drawing by Thomas Malton Sr in 1772 aged 23, and briefly lodged with the family in 1775, aged 26, Malton had a wooden leg:

"The eldest son (about sixteen) when an infant had the misfortune to fracture his leg so badly as to make amputation of the broken limb necessary. He, however, recovered, using the wooden substitute with wonderful dexterity and agility, running up and down stairs faster than I could with my legs perfect. This mutilated boy possessed as extraordinary genius as his father, and was one of the best draftsmen in England. He afterwards executed and published many works that deservedly gained him both profit and credit."

However, Hickey gives the ages of Thomas and his eldest sister Ann as 16 and 13 in 1772, and 15 and 16 in 1775 — when in fact Thomas must have been at least 20 and then at least 23. This raises the question of whether Hickey's recollection and identification can be trusted. As Maurice Craig asked in 1995, "Can we, therefore, believe Hickey at all? On his own admission he led such a dissolute life that it is a wonder to us that he can recall so many events in such detail, and perhaps this makes him suspect". Nevertheless Craig considered that Hickey "can hardly have invented the fact of Thomas junior's wooden leg, and this, too, seems to be something not otherwise recorded".

== Works ==
Works by Malton can be found in the UK Government art collection and the Victoria and Albert Museum in London; the Victoria Art Gallery in Bath, Somerset and the State Hermitage Museum in Saint Petersburg, Russia.
