= Pop-up book =

Book with moving parts, commonly directed at children

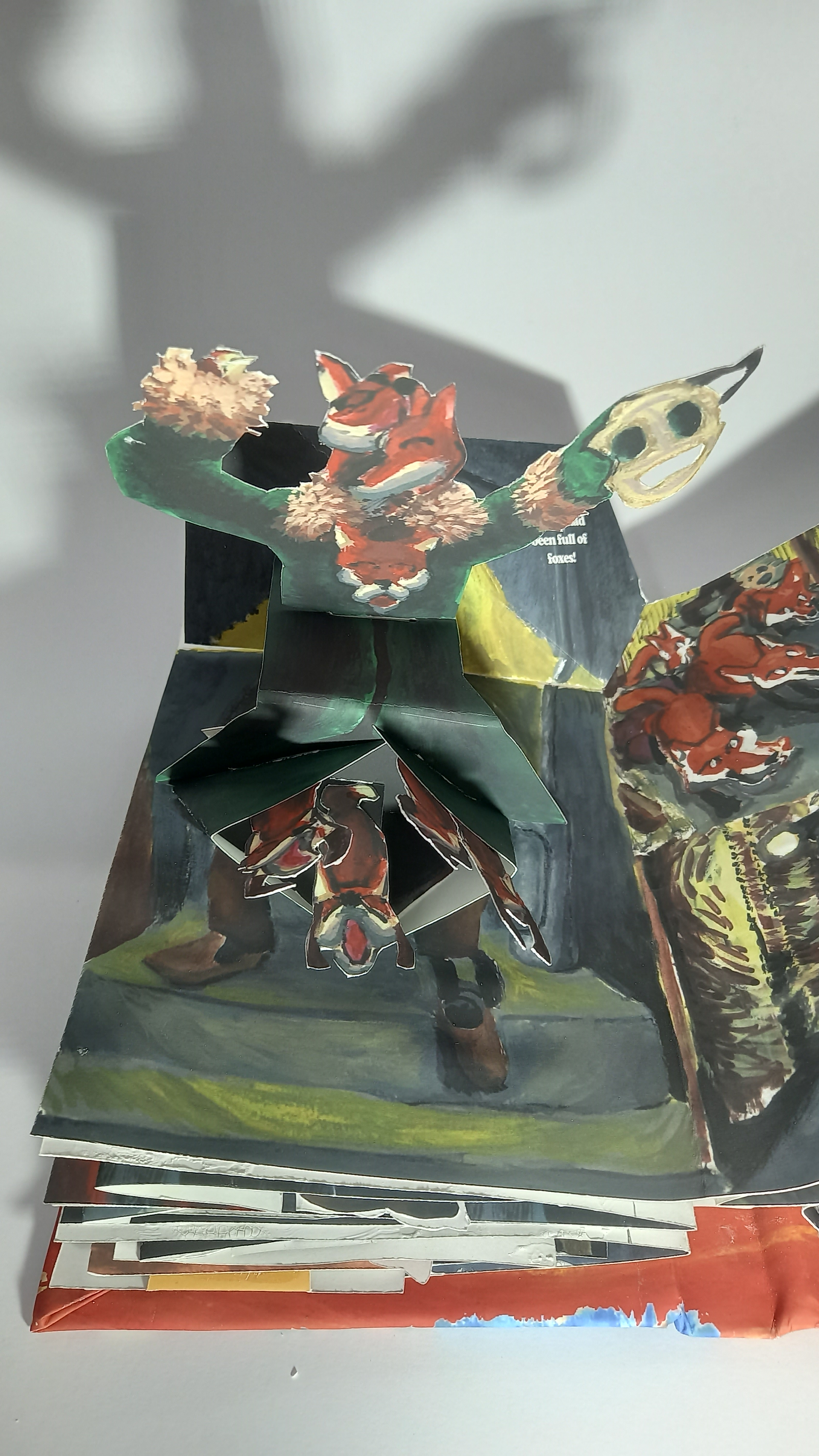
A page from a pop-up book, with a character "popping up" out of the book

Demonstration of the action of a pop-up book.

A pop-up book is any book with three-dimensional pages, often with elements that pop up as a page is turned. The terminology serves as an umbrella term for movable book, pop-ups, tunnel books, transformations, volvelles, flaps, pull-tabs, pop-outs, pull-downs, and other features each performing in a different manner. Three-dimensional greeting cards use the same principles. Design and creation of such books in arts is sometimes called "paper engineering". This usage should not be confused with traditional paper engineering, the engineering of systems to mass-produce paper products.

== Animated books ==
Animated books combine three elements: story, colored illustrations which include text, and "two or more animated illustrations with their movement mechanisms working between a doubled page". In 1938, Julian Wehr's animations for children's books were patented as "moving illustrations" that move the picture up and down and horizontally at the same time with a single movement.

== Transformations ==
Transformations show a scene made up of vertical slats. When a reader pulls a tab on the side, the slats slide under and over one another to "transform" into a totally different scene. Ernest Nister, one of the early English children's book authors, often produced books solely of transformations. Many of these have been reproduced by the Metropolitan Museum of Art.

== Tunnel books ==
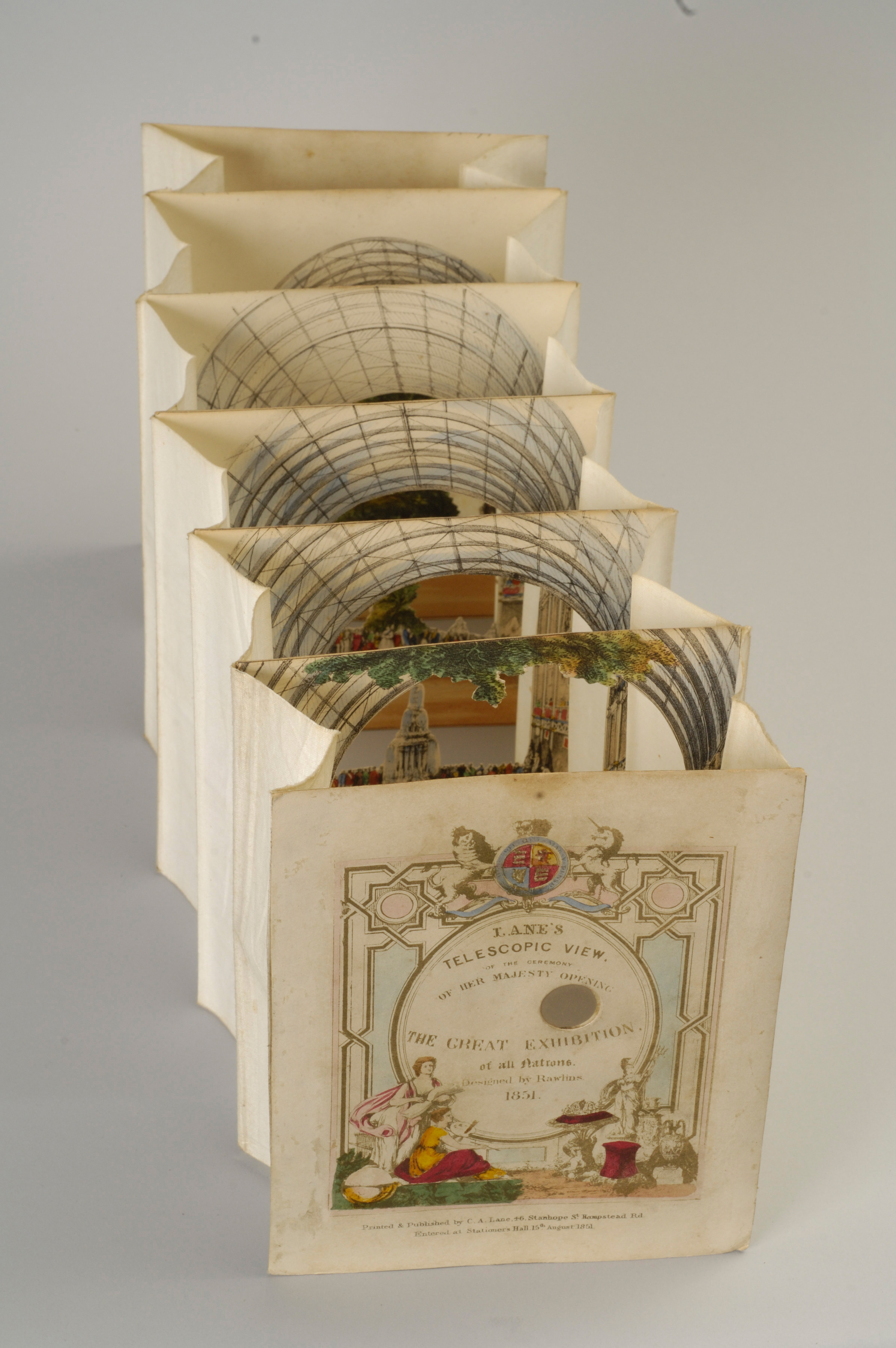
Tunnel book

Tunnel books (also called peepshow books) consist of a set of pages bound with two folded concertina strips on each side and viewed through a hole in the cover. Openings in each page allow the viewer to see through the entire book to the back, and images on each page work together to create a dimensional scene inside. This type of book dates from the mid-18th century and was inspired by theatrical stage sets. Traditionally, these books were often created to commemorate special events or sold as souvenirs of tourist attractions. The term "tunnel book" derives from the fact that many of these books were made to commemorate the building of the tunnel under the Thames River in London in the mid-19th century. In the United States, tunnel books were made for such attractions as World's Fairs and the New York Botanical Gardens.

Recently the tunnel book format has been resurrected by book artist Carol Barton and others as a sculptural book form. Artists are interested not only in the book's interior views, but also in treating the side accordions and covers as informational and visual surfaces. A selection of tunnel books by Carol Barton is archived in the special collections of Virginia Commonwealth University's James Branch Cabell Library.

== Volvelles ==
Volvelles are paper constructions with rotating parts. An early example is the Astronomicum Caesareum, by Petrus Apianus, which was made for the Holy Roman Emperor Charles in 1540. The book is full of nested circular pieces revolving on grommets.

== Harlequinades and turn-up books ==
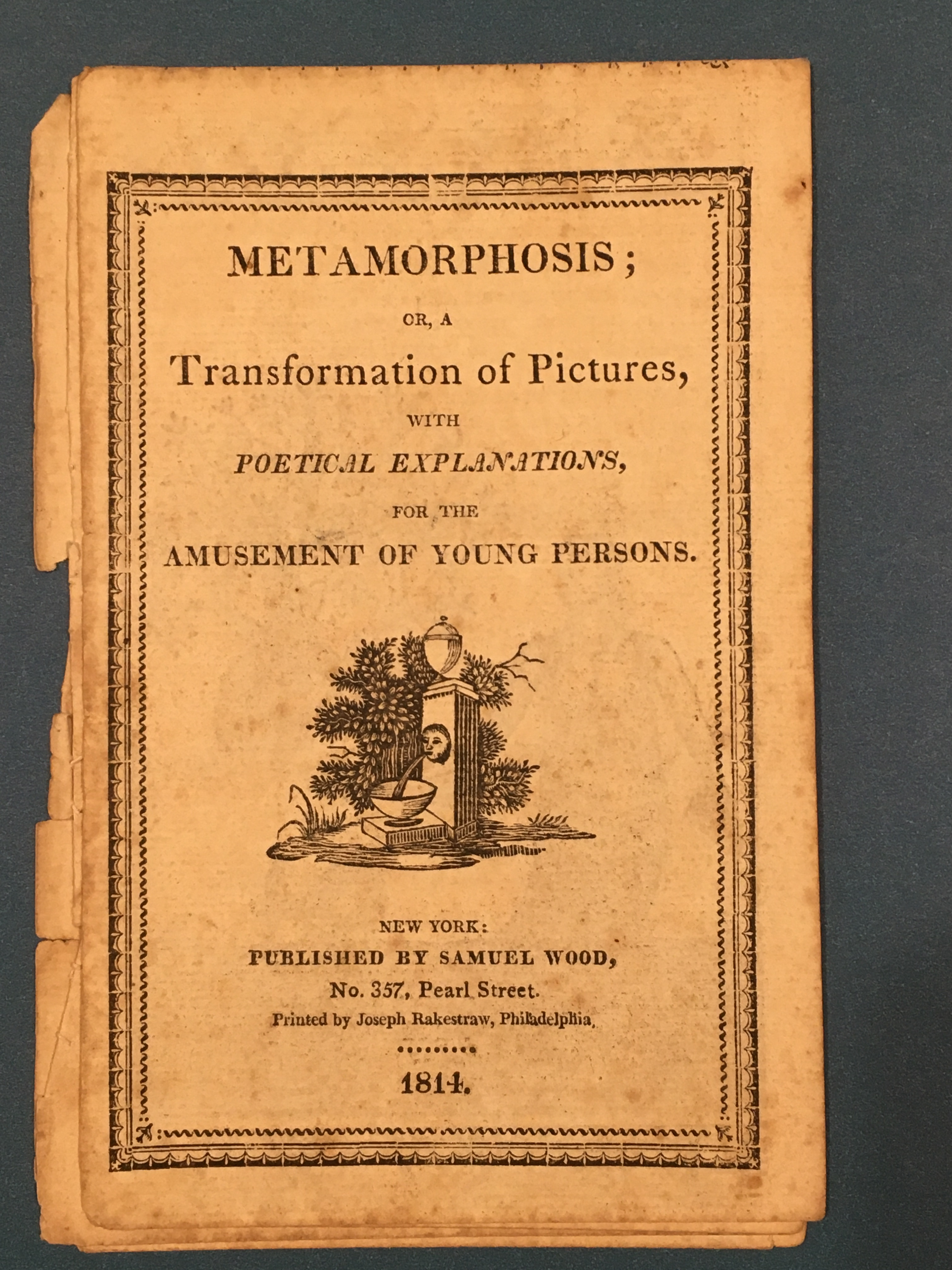
Metamorphosis (a Harlequinades booklet), 1814 by Benjamin Sands

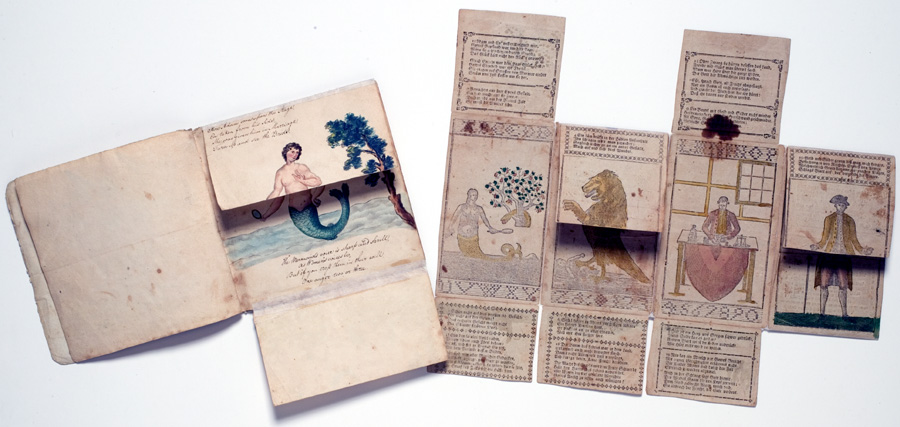
Comparison of two of Benjamin Sands's transformation books: Metamorphosis

About 1765, English printer Robert Sayer began experimenting with a novelty format for the juvenile book market, an early forerunner to interactive movable books, according to book historian Peter Haining. The outcome was the creation of the "metamorphoses" format, "a thin book of four sections each with two flaps which folded over, and on each section an interchangeable picture. Beneath those pictures appeared some descriptive lines of verse, and as the reader turned up the flaps in the correct order in the text difference scenes were revealed".

Sayer created books featuring the "Harlequins" from popular theater pantomimes. The black and white publications, which were also called Harlequinades or turn-up books, sold for sixpence and the hand-colored ones for one shilling.

By late 1770, Sayer had published four turn-up or metamorphosis books, which became a "craze with children". Rival booksellers, such as Thomas Hughes and George Martin soon copied the "turn-up" format. In the United States, Joseph Rakestraw published "Metamorphosis; or, a Transformation of Pictures, with Poetical Explanations, for the Amusement of Young Persons", by Benjamin Sands.

== History ==
The audience for early movable books were adults, not children. The first known movable in a book was created by Benedictine monk Matthew Paris in his Chronica Majora, which covers a period beginning in 1240. Paris attached volvelles onto some of the pages which were used by the monks to help calculate holy days. It is speculated that the Catalan mystic and poet Ramon Llull, of Majorca, also used volvelles to illustrate his theories in the early 14th century, but no physical example of a paper volvelle created by him has ever been documented. Throughout the centuries volvelles have been used for such diverse purposes as teaching anatomy, making astronomical predictions, creating secret code, and telling fortunes. By 1564 another movable astrological book titled Cosmographia Petri Apiani had been published. In the following years, the medical profession made use of this format, illustrating anatomical books with layers and flaps showing the human body. The English landscape designer Capability Brown made use of flaps to illustrate "before and after" views of his designs.

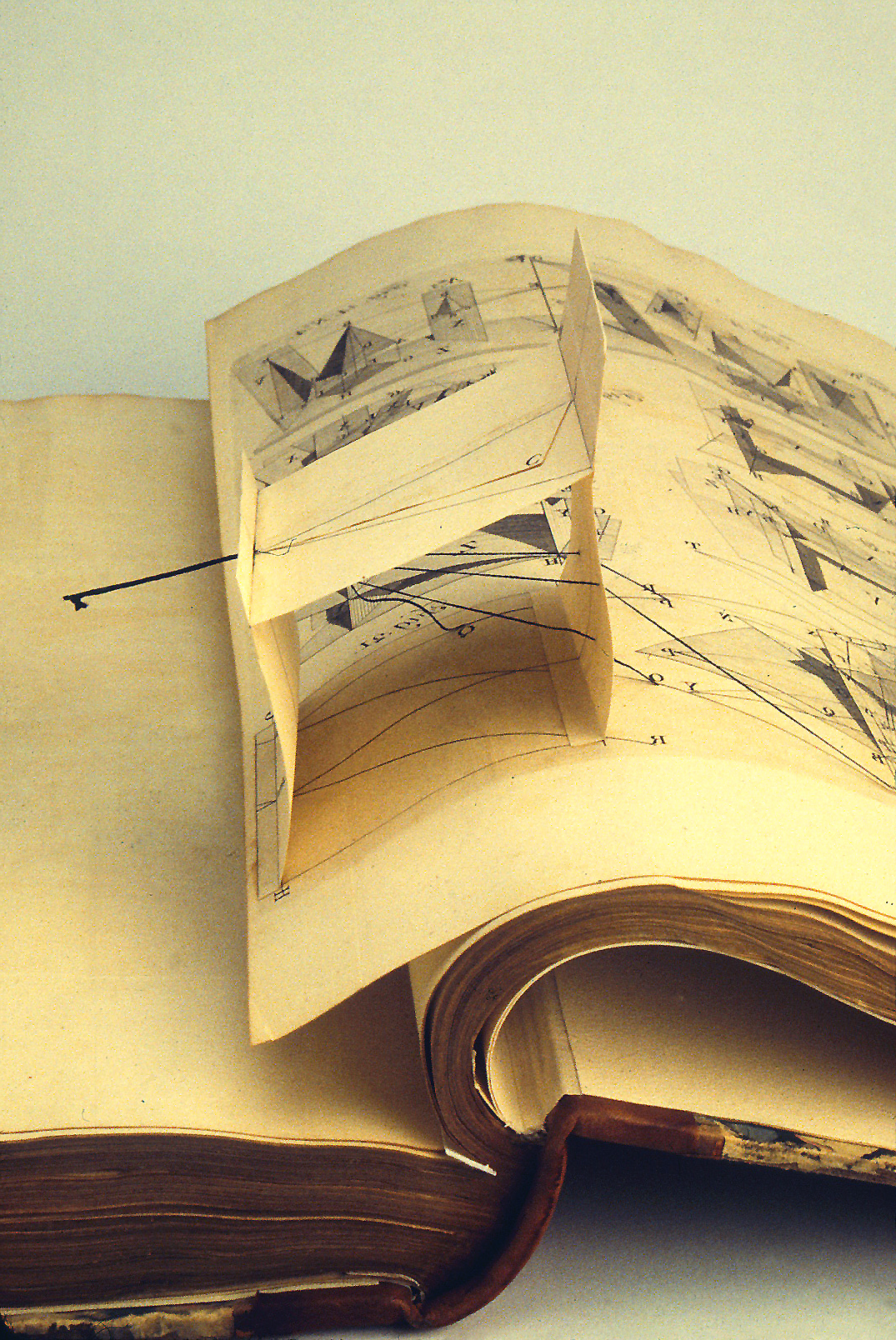
Page with pop-up part in Thomas Malton the Elder's book Treatise on Perspective (1775).

While it can be documented that books with movable parts had been used for centuries, they were almost always used in scholarly works. In 1775 Thomas Malton, the elder published A Compleat Treatise on Perspective in Theory and Practice, on the Principles of Dr. Brook Taylor. A Compleat Treatise on Perspective is the earliest known commercially produced pop-up book since it contains three-dimensional paper mechanisms. The pop-ups are activated by pulling string and form geometric shapes used to aid the reader in understanding the concept of perspective.

It was not until the very late 18th century that these techniques were applied to books designed for entertainment, particularly for children.

Some of the first three-dimensional and tab activated books were produced by Ernest Nister and Lothar Meggendorfer. These books were popular in Germany and Britain during the 19th century.

A geometric diagram of the basic principle of a pop-up book: the parallelogram

A significant development in the field of pop-up books came in 1929 with the publication of the Daily Express Children's Annual Number 1, "with pictures that spring up in model form". This was produced by Louis Giraud and Theodore Brown. Four more Daily Express Annuals followed, and Giraud set up his own publishing house, Strand Publications, which produced the groundbreaking series of Bookano books. The Bookano books are considered the first, true pop-up books for children because the pop-ups can be viewed from a full 360 degrees, not just the front side facing the viewer. There were seventeen Bookanos before the series came to an end with the death of Giraud in 1949.

One of the notable early examples of movable books in the United States is The Moving Picture Books, published in the early 20th century. These books featured mechanical illustrations that could move or change scenes with the pull of a tab. Initially published by Sully and Kleinteich, and later by The New York Book Company and the Pictorial Color Book Company, they became popular for their interactive storytelling and vibrant illustrations.

Another unusual type of pop-up during this time was the tissue paper honeycomb style introduced by United States publisher Bernard Wilmsen, often known by the publishing name B. Wilmsen, in his Tunnel Books.

In the United States, in the 1930s, Harold Lentz followed Giraud's lead with the production of the Blue Ribbon books in New York. In the United States, in the 1930s, Blue Ribbon Books in New York was the first publisher to use the term pop-up to describe their movable illustrations, and they became well known for their collaboration with Disney, producing popular pop-up editions such as The "Pop-Up" Mickey Mouse and The "Pop-Up" Donald Duck.

The next advance in the field was made by Vojtěch Kubašta working in Prague in the 1960s. His lead was followed by Waldo Hunt in the US with his founding of Graphics International. He and two companies he established, Graphics International and Intervisual Communications (which also produced pop-up advertisements), produced hundreds of pop-up books for children between the 1960s and 1990s. Although intended for US audiences, these books were assembled in areas with lower labor costs, initially Japan and later Singapore and Latin American countries such as Colombia and Mexico. Hunt's first pop-up book was Bennett Cerf's Pop-Up Riddle Book, published by Random House as a promotion for Maxwell House Coffee and showcasing the work of humorist Bennett Cerf, who was then president of Random House. The team of Waldo Hunt and Christopher Cerf created a total of 30 more children's pop-up books for publication by Random House, including books that featured Sesame Street characters. According to Bennett Cerf (in his book At Random), pop-up books were profitable for Random House.

In addition to his collaborations with Christopher Cerf at Random House, Hunt produced pop-up books for Walt Disney, a series of pop-up books based on Babar, and titles such as Haunted House by Jan Pienkowski and The Human Body by David Pelham.

== Notable works ==
Some pop-up books receive attention as literary works for the degree of artistry or sophistication which they entail. The 1967 book Andy Warhol's Index (Book) by Pop artist Andy Warhol, incorporates photographs of Warhol's Factory scene alsogside printed text, and interactive elements, including pop-ups of a medieval castle and a Hunt's tomato paste can, a flexi disc with audio recordings, and an inflatable silver balloon. Pop-up book artist Colette Fu designed China's largest pop-up book. In 2008, she was awarded a Fulbright Fellowship to create pop-up books of the 25 ethnic minorities residing in Yunnan Province, China. Her work can be found in the Library of Congress, Metropolitan Museum of Art and National Museum of Women in the Arts.

David A. Carter, who created many bug themed pop-ups, and Robert Sabuda are other prominent pop-up book authors. Star Wars: A Pop-Up Guide to the Galaxy, by Matthew Reinhart. This book received literary attention for its elaborate pop-ups, and the skill of its imagery, with The New York Times saying that "calling this sophisticated piece of engineering a 'pop-up book' is like calling the Great Wall of China a partition".

== Collections ==
=== Library collections ===
- Beinecke Rare Book and Manuscript Library at Yale University.
- Bowdoin College, the George J. Mitchell Department of Special Collections & Archives in Brunswick, Maine holds the Harold M. Goralnick Pop-up Book Collection, which contains 1,900 volumes.
- The North Carolina State University Libraries Research and Study Collection of Pop-Up Books 1960–2009 contains 7.5 linear feet of pop-up books, catalogs, newspaper clippings and other related ephemera pop-up book materials, many donated by Sara Frooman.
- The University of Iowa Special Collections Library in Iowa City includes the Matthew Reinhart Pop-up Book Collection and the Emily Martin Collection, two noted paper engineers.
- The University of Michigan Library in Ann Arbor, Michigan holds the William A. Gosling Pop-up and Movable Book Collection, which contains approximately 3,000 pop-up and movable books.
- The University of New Hampshire Dimond Library in Durham, New Hampshire holds the Carel Chapman Movable Book Collection, which contains over 1,800 pop-up and movable books.
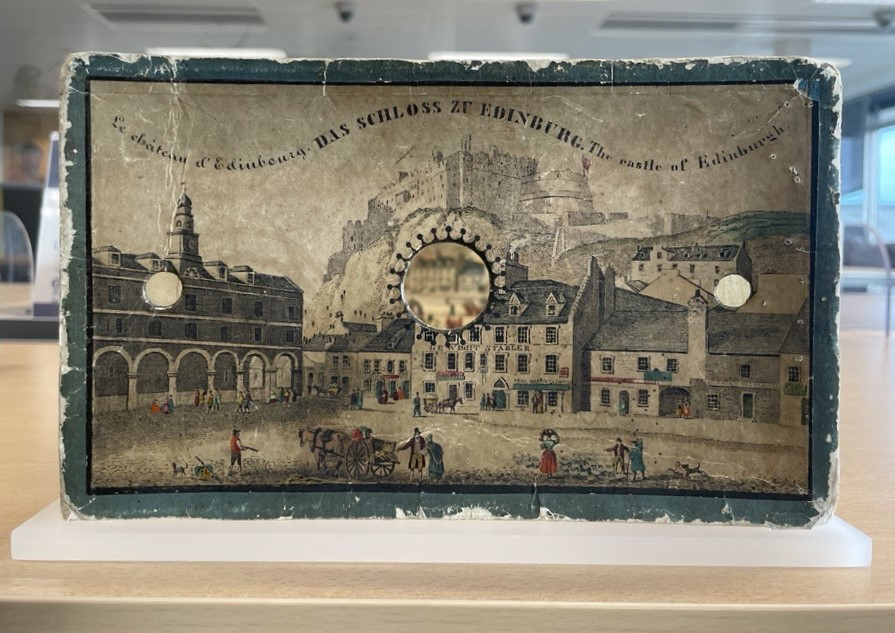
- Le Chateau d'Edinbourg Das Schloss zu Edinburg The Castle of Edinburgh from Edinburgh University Heritage Collections
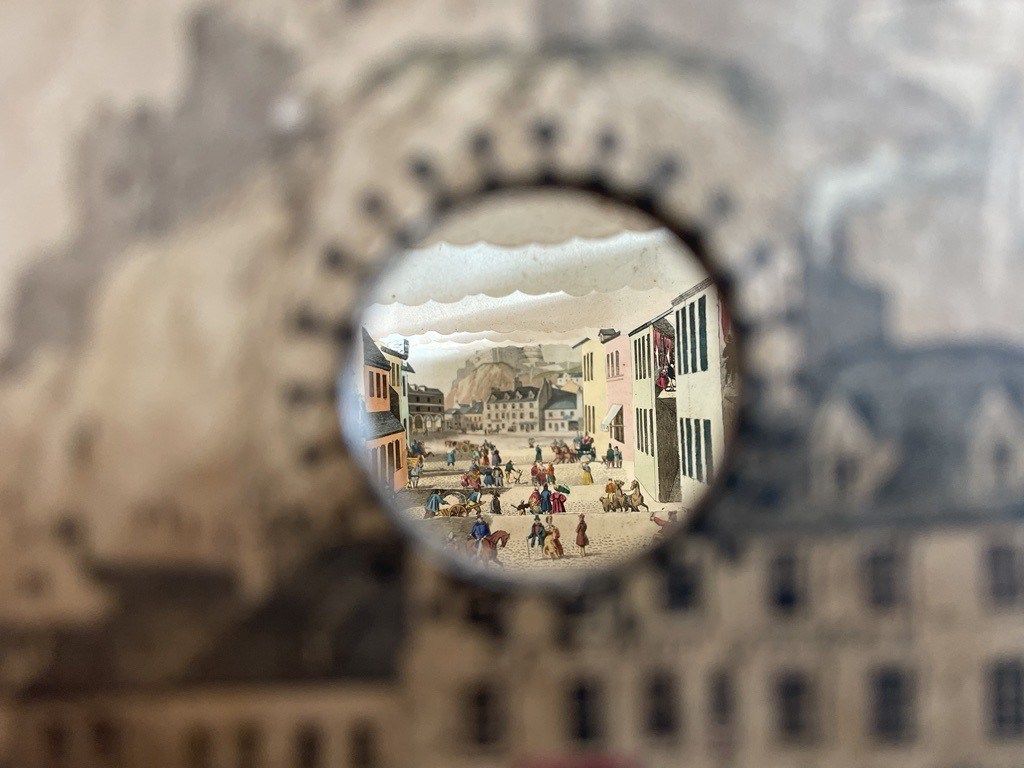
  Peep hole in the Le Chateau d'Edinbourg Das Schloss zu Edinburg The Castle of Edinburgh from Edinburgh University Heritage Collections
  Virginia Commonwealth University Libraries Special Collections and Archives holds the Betty Tisinger Collection and many other examples of pop-up and movable books.

=== Museum collections ===
- Cooper-Hewitt, Smithsonian Design Museum has over 1,700 titles in its Pop-Up Book Collection.
- Rosenbach Museum and Library in Philadelphia, Pennsylvania includes 643 books from illustrator Maurice Sendak's bequeath of his Lothar Meggendorfer collection of movable books.

== Associations ==
Since 1993, the Movable Book Society has provided a forum for artists, book sellers, book producers, collectors, curators, and others to share enthusiasm and exchange information about pop-up and movable books. The organization also awards industry prizes for best paper engineer (trade and artists’ book) and excellence in paper engineering by an undergraduate or graduate student.

== In popular culture ==
- The central plot of the film Paddington 2 (2017) revolves around trying to retrieve "Mrs. Kozlovas Pop-Up Book", a pop-up book containing clues that lead to a treasure.
- The children's animated television series Zack and Quack takes place in a world on the pages of a pop-up book. The nine-year-old boy Jack and his duck friend Quack go on adventures involving paper and pulling tabs to transform scenes.

== See also ==
- Alphabet book
- Altered book
- Art diary
- Artist's book
- Bookbinding
- Chapbook
- Concealing objects in a book
- Copybook
- Doujinshi
- Ezine
- Fine press
- Interactive children's book
- Miniature book
- Minicomic
- Origami
- Pamphlet
- Paper craft
- Paper fortune teller
- Paper plane
- Toy book
- Visual poetry
- Volvelle
- Zine
