= Bernard Wilmsen =

Bernard Wilmsen (1858–1948), often known by the publishing name B. Wilmsen, was a German-born American entrepreneur who, in the late 19th century, produced intricate and colorful "pop-up" style books under the "Triumph Editions" label.

Wilmsen initially started his career by establishing a small factory in Philadelphia, where he utilized hand-operated machines imported from Germany to produce tinsel. This venture, named B. Wilmsen & Co., quickly became successful. In 1887, he expanded his business further by securing patent rights from George W. Landenberger, which led to the creation of his company's first ornament, a glass ball surrounded by a heart. In its early days, Wilmsen's company depended largely on German suppliers for goods like metal caps for ornaments, tinsel, and crepe paper. Over time, however, the business developed its own production techniques, including the use of honeycomb paper, which became a signature feature of Wilmsen's products.

A key turning point for Wilmsen came in the fall of 1880 when he partnered with F.W. Woolworth. This collaboration significantly boosted Wilmsen's business. His products were distributed widely through department stores, dime stores, and mail-order catalogs. In addition to Christmas decorations, the company produced items for other holidays, including Halloween and Easter.

Wilmsen also expanded into other ventures, particularly focusing on tissue paper and honeycomb paper products, which he saw as essential to the ongoing success of his business. After acquiring the patent from Landenberger in 1887, he continued to introduce new products, including foil-covered bells in 1917, tinsel-trimmed balls in 1933, and foil-covered cone-shaped icicles in 1936.
