= E. P. Dutton =

Former American book publishing company

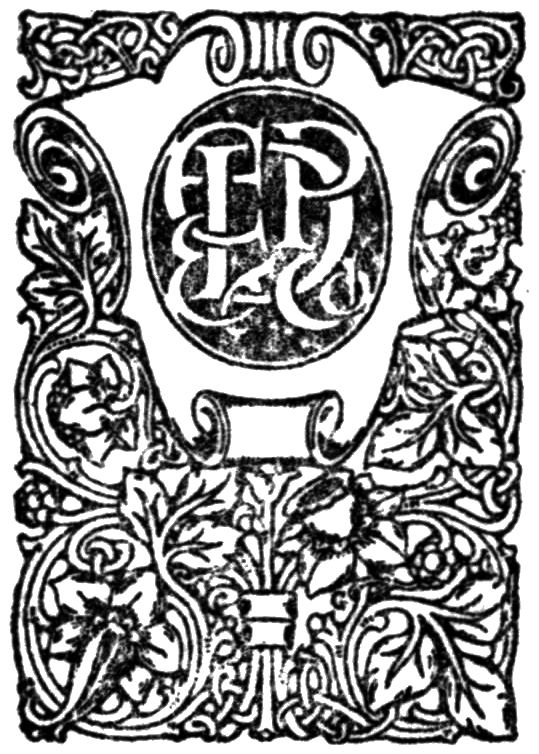
- Printer's mark c. 1895
- Parent company: Penguin Group (Penguin Random House)
- Founded: Boston, Massachusetts (1852)
- Founder: Edward Payson Dutton
- Country of origin: United States
- Headquarters location: New York City
- Publication types: Books
- Official website: Official website

E. P. Dutton is an American book publishing company. It was founded as a book retailer in Boston, Massachusetts, in 1852 by Edward Payson Dutton. Since 1986, it has been an imprint of Penguin Group.

== Creator ==
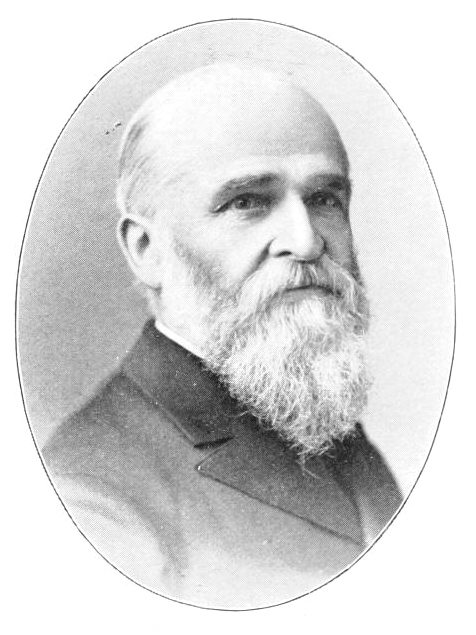
Edward Payson Dutton

Edward Payson Dutton (January 1, 1831 in Keene, New Hampshire – 1923) was a prominent American book publisher.

In 1852, Dutton founded the E. P. Dutton bookselling company in Boston, Massachusetts. The business sold fiction and non-fiction, and within a short time expanded into the selling of children's literature. In 1864, he opened a branch office to sell books in New York City and in 1869 moved his company's headquarters there and entered the book publishing business. From 1888 onward, he started working with Ernest Nister. In 1906, Dutton struck what proved to be a significant deal with the English publishing company of J. M. Dent to be the American distributor of the Everyman's Library series of classic literature reprints.

Edward Dutton died in 1923, aged 92, but his company continued to flourish and today is an imprint of the Penguin Group.

== History ==
Dutton expanded to New York City in 1864, where it began publishing religious books. In 1906, Dutton made a deal with English publishing company J. M. Dent to be the American distributor of the Everyman's Library series of classic literature reprints.

John Macrae joined the company in 1885 as an office boy, and in 1923 was named president. In 1928, the publishing and retail divisions were split into two separate businesses with Macrae acquiring the publishing side, operating as E. P. Dutton and Company, Inc.

It published children's books under the Unicorn imprint, with some books published in the 1990s. Dutton Children's Books continues today.

In 1975, Dutton was acquired by the Dutch publisher Elsevier. The following year, Dutton bought Hawthorn Books from W. H. Allen & Co. Dutton lost money under Dutch ownership, and the company was sold to the buyout firm Dyson-Kissner-Moran in 1981. The paperback publisher New American Library acquired Dutton in 1985.

New American Library was acquired by Penguin Group in 1986, and split into two imprints: Dutton and Dutton Children's Books. Dutton is now a boutique imprint within Penguin Group, publishing approximately 40 books for adults per year, half of them fiction and half non-fiction. After the acquisition by Penguin, books to which Penguin acquired the rights as part of the acquisition of Dutton were published in paperback under the imprint Puffin Unicorn (because Puffin has been the longtime paperback imprint for the Penguin Group). Penguin merged with Random House to form Penguin Random House in 2013.

In 2017, sister imprint Blue Rider Press was closed and its books were moved to Dutton.

== Book series ==
- Dutton Obelisk
- Dutton Paperbacks
- Everyman's Library
- Studio Vista/Dutton Pictureback
- Sunrise Book
- Told to the Children Series
- Unicorn Books
