= Pearl Fu =

Chinese-American community leader (born 1941)

- Born: 1941 (age 84–85); Kunming, Yunnan Province, China
- Occupations: Community leader and festival organizer
- Known for: Local Colors, Roanoke multicultural festival
- Children: 3, including Colette Fu
- Honours: Virginia Women in History, 2011

Pearl Fu (born c. 1941) is a Chinese-American community leader. She is known for her leadership of the Local Colors festival in Roanoke, Virginia and for initiating multicultural dialogue in the city. In 2011, she was named to Virginia Women in History for her work in promoting intercultural dialogue and community action.

== Biography ==
Pearl Fu grew up in a political family in Yunnan Province, China. Her family later moved to Hong Kong, but her mother instilled the family's Yi culture and traditions into her children.

=== Emigration to the United States ===
Pearl moved to the United States in 1959 with the intention of becoming a Broadway actress and dancer. She attended Maywood College in Pennsylvania and graduated from the Peabody Institute in 1963. She later married C.C. Fu, an engineer and fellow Chinese immigrant.

=== Local Colors ===
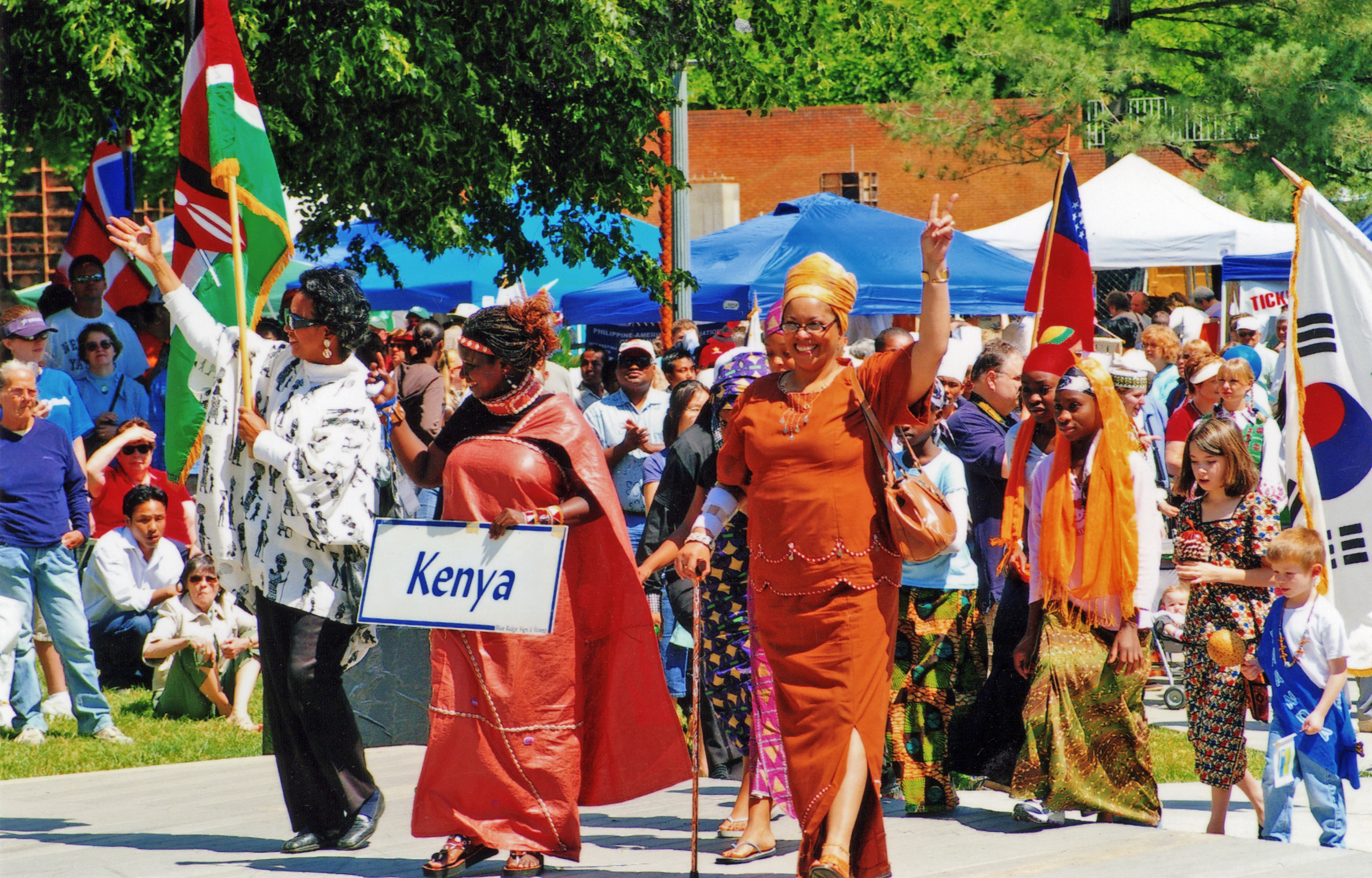
Parade of Nations at the 2016 Local Colors festival

In 1986, Pearl and C.C. Fu moved their family to Roanoke, Virginia, where Pearl would become active in the community. In 1991, Fu became involved with the Local Color street festival. She was the only Chinese person represented at the festival that year, and she committed herself to growing and celebrating immigrant contributions in the local community by growing the festival. For 25 years, Fu was the director of the community festival that became known as Local Colors (with an s), a community festival in the Roanoke Valley recognizing immigrants and fostering multicultural dialogue. Under Fu's leadership, the festival was transformed from a small street-corner celebration to an annual event drawing tens of thousands of visitors to the Roanoke Valley and celebrating over 100 ethnicities. She said, “Similarity is ordinary...We should go beyond that and rejoice in the differences.” As the leader of Local Colors, Fu became involved in many activities around multicultural dialogue in the city, including serving as a judge and participating in the city's St. Patrick's Day parade and the city's Greek Festival.

=== Roanoke Cultural Ambassador ===
In 1999, she was diagnosed with Parkinson's disease, but continued her work in the local community. Fu became involved in Roanoke's Sister Cities project, helping initiate a Sister cities agreement between Roanoke and Lijiang, China. In 2001 she was awarded the Perry F. Kendig Award from Hollins University and Roanoke College. In 2006, she was honored with Roanoke's Local Hero Award. Later she was named "Roanoke's Ambassador of Goodwill".

In 2011 she was honored by the Library of Virginia and named to the Virginia Women in History. That year, Pearl Fu was featured on a mural painted in downtown Roanoke by local artist Toobz titled, "The World is a Village".

=== Retirement ===
In 2014, she stepped down from her leadership role at Local Colors due to her worsening Parkinson's disease. In 2015, she was awarded the Cabell Brand Hope Award.

In 2019, Fu and her husband left Roanoke for Philadelphia, where they could live closer to their daughter. Due to Fu's outsize role in the local community and longstanding commitment to Roanoke, her move garnered media attention. That year, the Roanoke City Council named the Pearl Fu Plaza (23 Church Avenue Southeast, Roanoke, VA) in downtown Roanoke after her.
