= Thomas Malton, the elder =

Thomas Malton, the elder (1726–1801) was an English architectural draughtsman and writer on geometry.

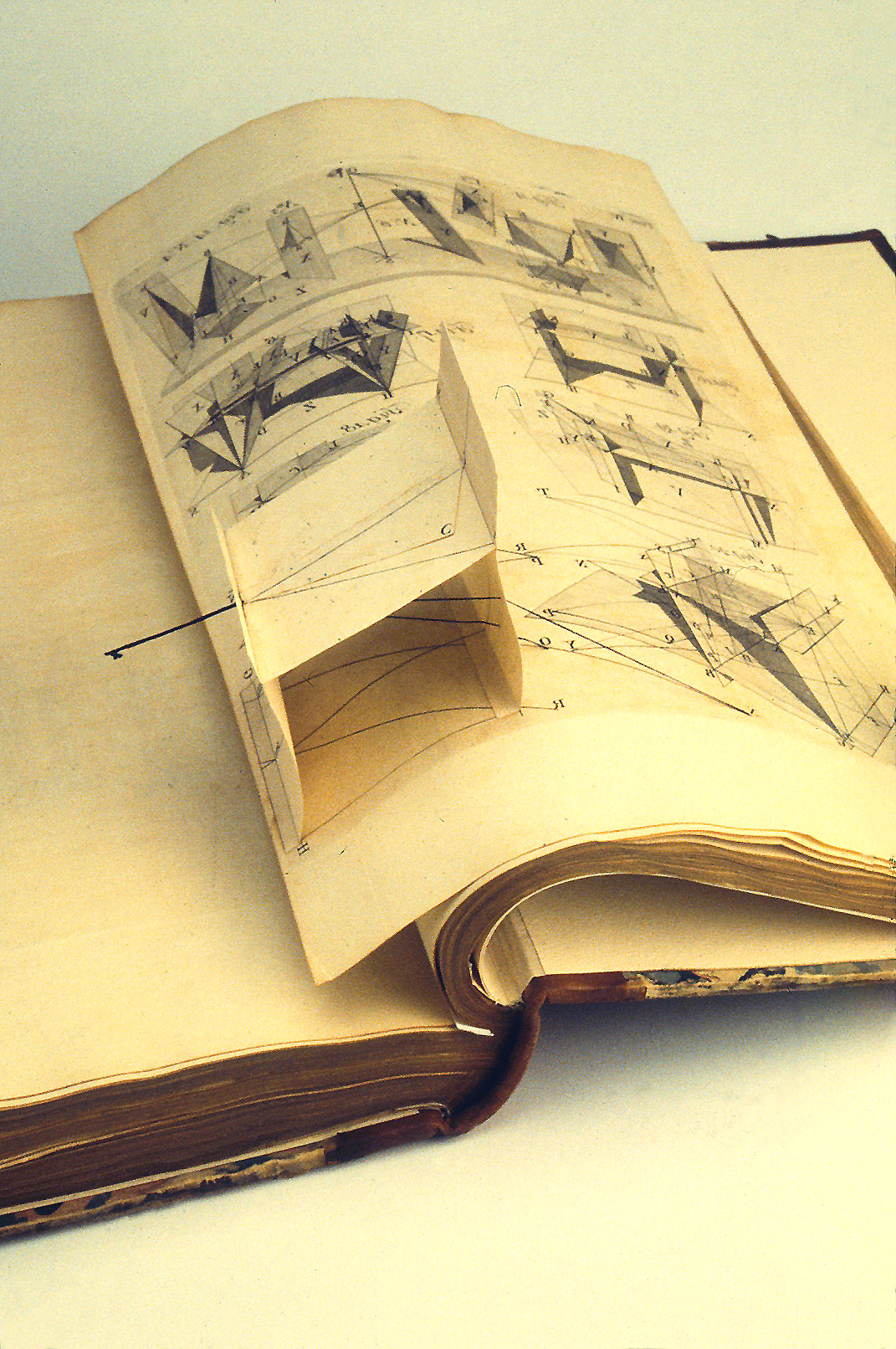
Thomas Malton the elder's Treatise on Perspective contains the first known 3-dimensional pop-up to appear in a commercially produced book.

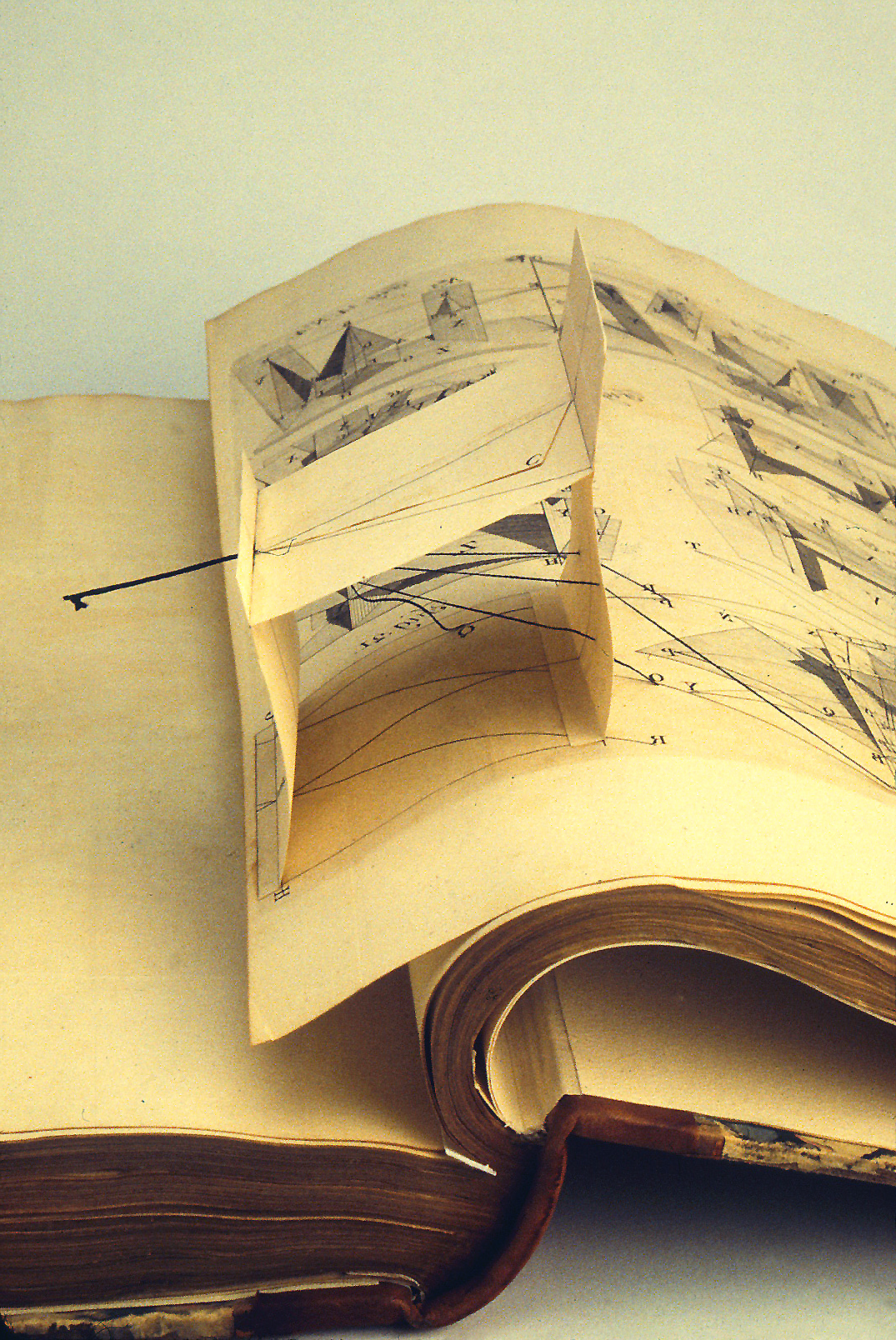
This pop-up, as well as the others in Treatise on Perspective were used to help artists and architects understand and apply the concept of perspective to their work.

== Life ==
Born in London, Malton originally kept an upholsterer's shop in the Strand. He contributed two drawings of St. Martin's Church to the exhibition of the Free Society of Artists in 1761, and also architectural drawings to the exhibitions of the Incorporated Society of Artists in 1766 and 1768. In 1772 and the following years he sent architectural drawings to the Royal Academy. There are drawings by him in the Victoria and Albert Museum.

In 1774 Malton published The Royal Road to Geometry; or an easy and familiar Introduction to the Mathematics, a school-book intended as an improvement on Euclid, and in 1775 A Compleat Treatise on Perspective in Theory and Practice, on the Principles of Dr. Brook Taylor. The Compleat Treatise is the earliest known commercially produced pop-up book. It contains 3-dimensional paper mechanisms. Some of the pop-ups are activated by pulling string and form geometric shapes used to aid the reader in understanding the concept of perspective. It came to replace the pamphlet of Joshua Kirby as the standard English work on linear perspective. He also gave lectures on perspective at his house in Poland Street, Soho.

Having fallen into financial difficulties in London he moved to Dublin, accompanied by his son James. He lived in Dublin for the rest of his life, gaining a reputation there as a lecturer on geometry. He died at Dublin on 18 February 1801

== Family ==
His eldest son was Thomas Malton, the younger. James Malton was another son.

== Notes ==
Attribution:

- This article incorporates text from a publication now in the public domain: Lee, Sidney, ed. (1893). "Malton, Thomas (1726–1801)". Dictionary of National Biography. Vol. 36. London: Smith, Elder & Co.
