= Ernest Nister =

German publisher and printer

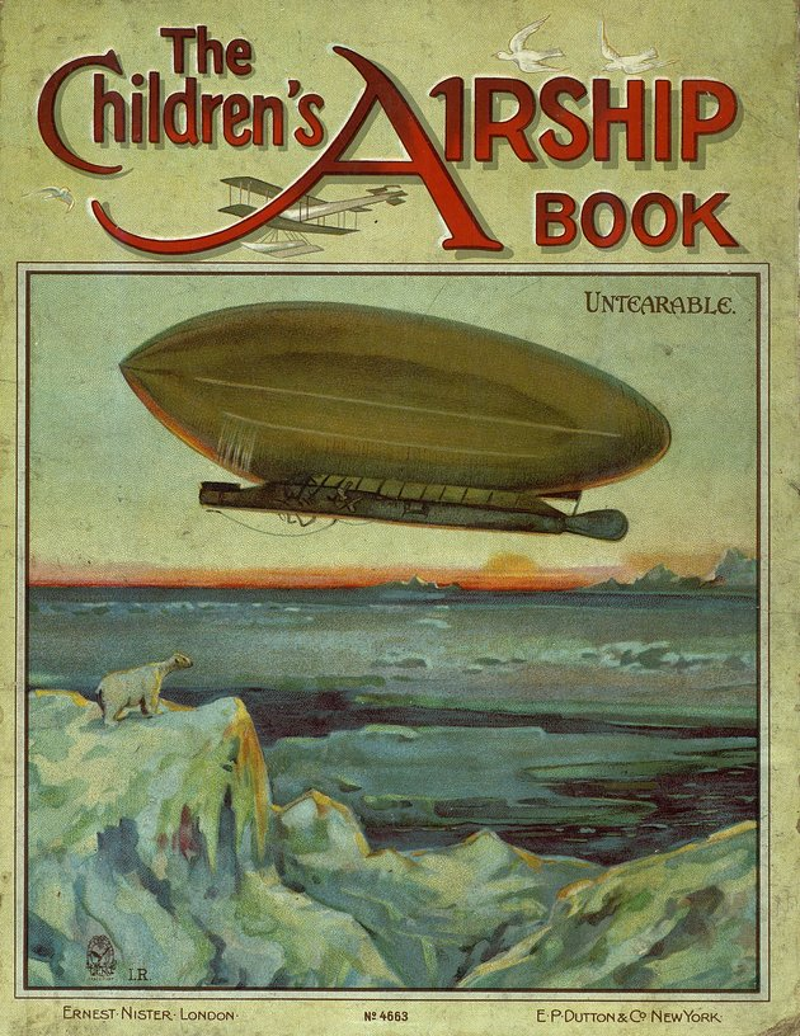
Nister, Airship-00

Ernest Nister (1841–1909) was a German publisher and printer of movable books for children and paper ephemera such as greeting cards, post cards and calendars. He was born in Darmstadt, Germany and later had an office in London. He refined the techniques used in the design of "magic windows", "dissolving picture" and pop-up books, publishing them from his firm in Nuremberg, a toy-making center of the 19th century.

== Types of books ==
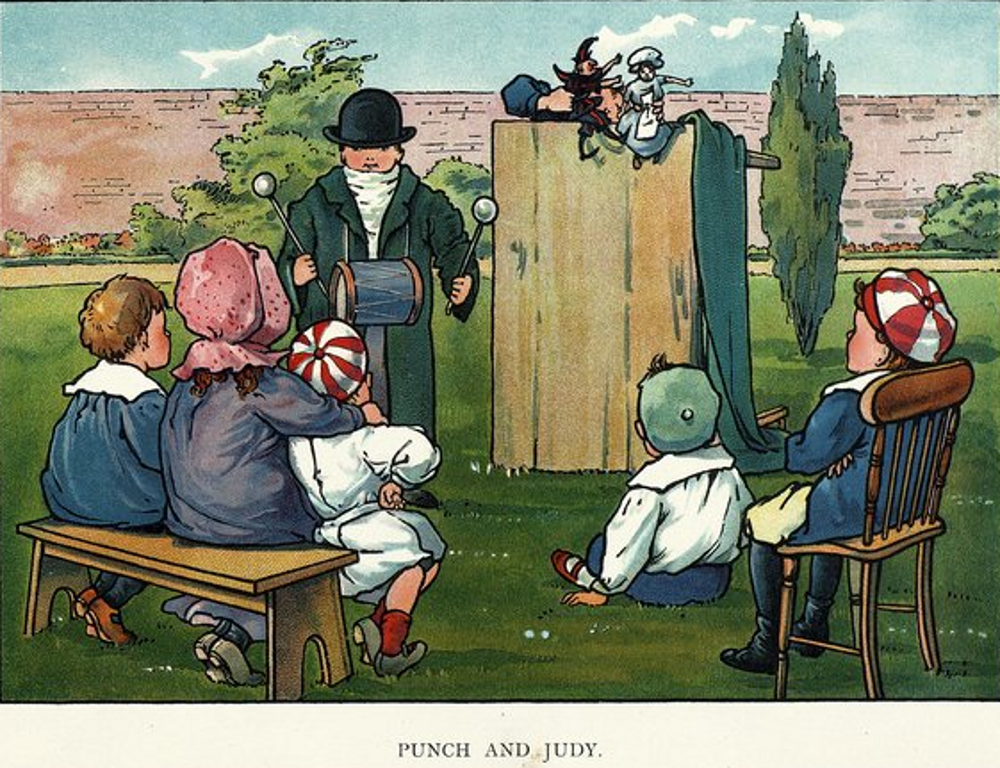
NisterLetspretend-11

Although not the first to invent pop-up books, he was the first to invent automatic pop-up books. Before Nister, pop-ups had to be manually maneuvered into an upright position. "Pop-up books" is a term sometimes applied to other movable books, volvelles, tunnel books, pull tabs, and other varied forms of paper engineering; similar techniques such as die cutting and embossing are often also used in greeting cards. Children's books with movable parts are subject to the play of children and may not work properly after heavy use. Older mechanical books in library or personal collections can be preserved by professional conservators. The older original first edition books by Ernest Nister can be found in antiquarian book stores and the archives of Library rare book collections.

== Editing ==
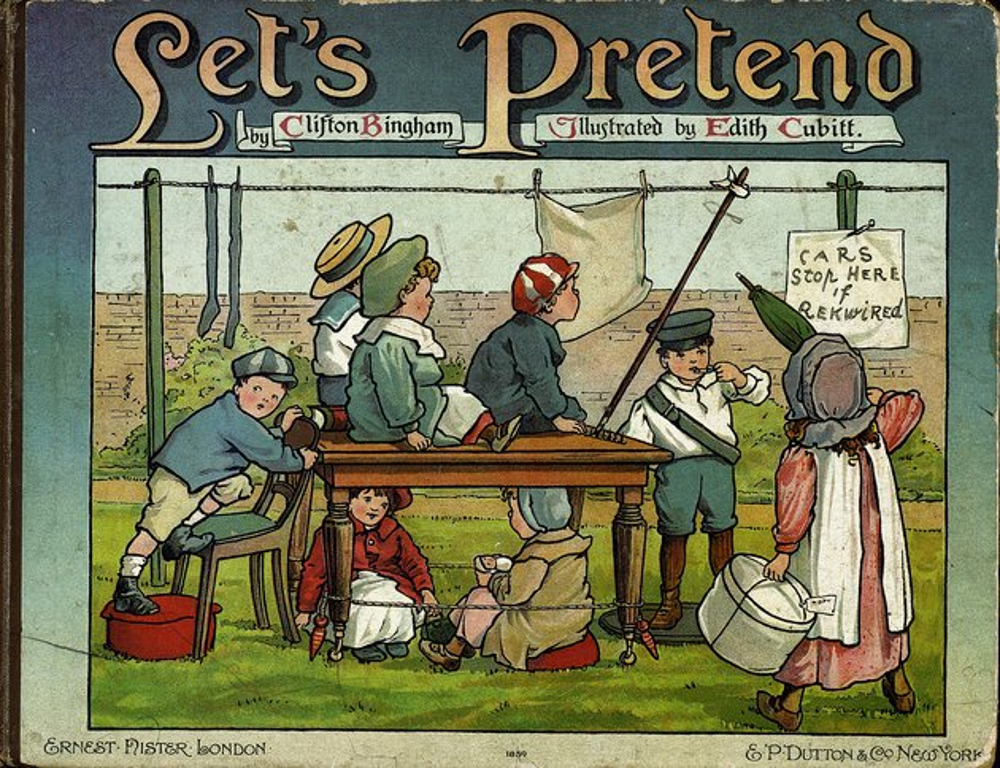
NisterLetspretend-01

It is not known exactly how much of his own drawing he contributed to the illustrations of the books he edited and printed, but he would sometimes remove an artist's name and replace it with his own. Louis Wain, known for his anthropomorphic cats, was one of the illustrators who worked for Nister. In 1894, Beatrix Potter sold a series of verses and illustrations to Nister for his Changing Pictures series.

== Marketing ==
In addition to the German books, an English version was produced for Nister's London office and an American version, working with Edward Payson Dutton, for Dutton Publishing, his American publisher. Vintage chromolithographically printed postcards of Father Christmas by Nister are now sold on Etsy, Amazon, AbeBooks and eBay.
