= The Moving Picture Books =

American children's book publishers

The Moving Picture Book Company and The Pictorial Color Book Company were early 20th-century American publishers known for producing interactive children's books. These publishers specialized in creating movable books, which featured mechanical illustrations that could move or change scenes with the pull of a tab.

== Early history and innovations ==
The Moving Picture Book Company, established in the early 1900s, often featured dynamic illustrations that allowed readers to animate scenes by pulling tabs or turning pages with movable elements. This interactive approach transformed traditional reading experiences into an immersive one. The company's most successful series, *The Moving Picture Books*, gained widespread popularity and was a pivotal example of early mechanical books in the United States.

The earliest English editions in this series seem to have been released around 1909. In the United States, many of the initial books were published by Sully and Kleinteich (S&K), priced at 35 cents. Following S&K, during the early 1920s, the books were also issued by The New York Book Company and the Pictorial Color Book Company (PCBC), who sold them for 50 cents. They all utilized advanced printing techniques for their time, including lithography and chromolithography, to produce vibrant, colorful pages that captivated young readers. These publications featured high-quality illustrations that set them apart from standard children's books of the era.

== Legacy and collectibility ==
Though both companies eventually ceased operations, their contributions to movable books remain significant. Movable and mechanical books from The Moving Picture Book Company and The Pictorial Color Book Company are highly sought after by collectors today due to their historical importance, craftsmanship, and rarity. The books published by these companies are part of a key chapter in the evolution of children's interactive literature in the United States. Their designs laid the groundwork for later developments in the movable book genre, influencing contemporary and later publishers.

The enduring appeal of these books can also be attributed to their innovative engineering and colorful artwork, elements that continue to capture the imagination of collectors. Publications from these companies are considered valuable and are frequently cited as some of the earliest examples of movable books in the American market.
