= Helen Hiebert =

American book artist and papermaker

- Born: 1965; Tennessee
- Known for: book artist, papermaker, author, educator
- Website: helenhiebertstudio.com

Helen Hiebert (b. 1965 Tennessee) Is an American artist known for her artist's books, installations, papermaking, and books about papercraft.

Her artist's books are in the collection of the Metropolitan Museum of Art, the Smithsonian Libraries, and the Rhode Island School of Design.

== Career ==
Hiebert is the author of several books about paper crafts including Papermaking with Garden Plants & Common Weeds, Paper Illuminated, and The Art of Papercraft.

In 2008 Reed College hosted her installation The Hydrogen Bond. Her installation The Wish is in the Anythink Huron Street public library in Thornton, Colorado. In 2022 her installation Step Into the Light was featured at the Thornton public library. Her installation Mother Tree has been on display at the Museum of Motherhood since 2021 and is now part of its permanent collection. In 2025 Hiebert was included in the exhibition Legacies in Paper at the Robert C. Williams Museum of Papermaking along with Nancy Cohen and Sara Garden Armstrong.

Hiebert's studio is located in Red Cliff, Colorado, where she produces handmade paper and holds papermaking retreats. In 2022 Hiebert was included in the North American Hand Papermakers (NAHP) Hall of Papermaking Champions.
