= Carol Barton =

American book artist and paper engineer

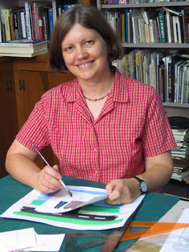
- Carol Barton at work in her studio
- Born: Carol June Barton; June 3, 1954 (age 72); St. Louis, Missouri
- Known for: Book Artist, Paper Engineer, Artist, Educator, Curator
- Awards: Bogliasco Fellowship, Sacatar Foundation Fellowship

Carol Barton (born 3 June 1954) is a book artist, paper engineer, curator, and educator known for her series of interactive workbooks, The Pocket Paper Engineer.

Barton is the proprietor of Popular Kinetics Press and has published several editions of artist books.

== Early life and education ==
Barton was born in St. Louis, Missouri.

She earned her BFA in 1976 from St. Louis School of Fine Arts at Washington University, and graduated as a painting major.

== Career ==
After moving Washington, D.C., in 1977, Barton was hired as an arts administrator at the Glen Echo Park Arts Center. The Writers’ Center, a resident organization formed by graduates of Visual Studies Workshop in Rochester, New York, presented Barton's first exposure to the book arts. When The Writers’ Center received a grant from the National Endowment for the Arts to produce twenty artists’ books, Barton was invited as a participant in the project. She welcomed the opportunity to explore the book form as an artistic medium.

Barton's first book, Beyond the Page (1981), was produced with use of die cuts and she found it to be a trying experience. She was prepared to abandon her work in the book arts until two things happened: She experienced success when her edition of Beyond the Page sold out and she was exposed by a friend to an early Italian Sleeping Beauty carousel book. She became enthralled with the concept that a book could be both sculptural and mechanical.

Fueled by her renewed interest in the book arts, Barton embarked on a two-year study of movable and pop-up books, which began at the Smithsonian's Dibner Rare Book Library. She traveled to libraries and collections across the United States where she discovered a wide variety of books utilizing sculptural formats and uncommon engineering techniques. As she began to better understand the materials and methods used in the construction of these books, Barton began compiling ideas for the production of her own editions of artist books.

One result of her research was that Barton is credited with reestablishing the tunnel book as a book structure The tunnel format was used in tourist souvenirs and commemorative books as early as the mid-18th century.

Barton started teaching in 1983 at the Pyramid Atlantic Art Center. Through many years of teaching, Barton found that the best way for students to learn paper engineering techniques was through direct, hands-on experience. It was this knowledge that inspired the creation of her workbook series on pop-up design and construction, The Pocket Paper Engineer. Barton continues to teach as a faculty member of The University of the Arts in Philadelphia and in classrooms around the world.

Barton's work has been published in many publications and exhibited internationally. She was awarded an artist' book residency grant from Women's Studio Workshop in 1988 which resulted in two artist's books. International residencies Barton has been awarded include: the Bogliasco Foundation in Italy, the Sacatar Foundation in Brazil, the Moulin a Nef Studios in Auvillar, France, and the GilsfjordurArts Studios in Iceland. She was the first Dorothy Liskey Wampler Distinguished Art Professorship visiting scholar at James Madison University Special Collections.

Her work is in many collections, including The National Museum of Women in the Arts, The Walker Art Center, The Center for the Book Arts, The Getty Museum, Library of Congress, Museum of Modern Art, The Smithsonian Institution, and the Victoria and Albert Museum in London.

Barton also produces children's books under the World of Wishes (Scholastic Canada Ltd) theme.

Barton's archives are held at James Madison University Libraries Special Collections.

== Bibliography ==
- Barton, Carol (1981), Beyond the Page, Popular Kinetics Press
- Barton, Carol (1986), Small Gardens, Popular Kinetics Press.
- Barton, Carol (1988), Everyday Road Signs, Popular Kinetics Press.
- Barton, Carol (1988), Tunnel Map, Popular Kinetics Press.
- Barton, Carol (1989), Loom, Popular Kinetics Press.
- Barton, Carol (1990), Rhythmic Notes on Seven Folds, Popular Kinetics Press.
- Barton, Carol (1991), Plant This Book, Popular Kinetics Press.
- Barton, Carol (1993), Instructions for Assembly, Popular Kinetics Press.
- Barton, Carol (1994), A Journal of One's Own: A Handcrafting Kit. Running Press, 1994.
- Barton, Carol (1997), Home Dreams, Popular Kinetics Press.
- Barton, Carol (1998), Vision Shifts, Borowsky Center
- Barton, Carol (1999) Mermaid Wishes, Scholastic Canada Ltd., ISBN 978-0-439-93535-7
- Barton, Carol (2001), Five Luminous Towers: A Book to be Read in the Dark, Popular Kinetics Press.
- Barton, Carol (2003), Alphabetica Synthetica, Popular Kinetics Press.
- Barton, Carol (2005), The Pocket Paper Engineer, Volume I: Basic Forms: How to Make Pop-Ups Step-by-Step, Popular Kinetics Press, ISBN 0-9627752-0-7
- Barton, Carol (2007) Pony Wishes, Scholastic Canada Ltd., ISBN 978-0-439-93566-1
- Barton, Carol (2008), The Pocket Paper Engineer, Volume 2: Platforms and Props: How to Make Pop-Ups Step-by-Step, Popular Kinetics Press, ISBN 0-9627752-2-3
