= Andrew Baron (paper engineer) =

American paper engineer (born 1962)

Andrew (Andy) Baron
- Born: March 31, 1962 (age 63)
- Occupation: Paper engineer
- Spouse: Paula
- Website: popyrus.com

Andrew Baron (born 1962) is a self-taught, award-winning paper engineer and singled out by Robert Sabuda, a leading children's pop-up book artist, as a wunderkind of pull tabs, specific devices used to cause movement in pop-up books.

== Biography ==
Baron was awarded the Movable Book Society's Meggendorfer Prize for Best Paper Engineering in 2004 for Knick-Knack Paddywhack! The book, by Paul O. Zelinsky, has “200 movable parts, 300 glue points – twice the usual number – 15 lift-the-flaps, and 10 parts on the last spread alone, moving simultaneously with one tab!... 500 people [at the Hua Yang Printing Company in China] worked on the book." Of this book, Robert Sabuda noted, "his designs are unique, complex, thoughtful and he doesn't skimp on the amount of paper or rivets needed to accomplish an action."

Baron has also repaired and restored old clocks, music boxes, radios and typewriters since childhood. In 2007, Baron spent about 70 hours repairing the "Draughtsman-Writer" automaton by Henri Maillardet (1745–1830). A version of Maillardet’s automaton, a self-powered robot that writes poetry and draws four different images, was in Martin Scorsese’s movie Hugo and Brian Selznick’s book The Invention of Hugo Cabret.

== Selected bibliography ==
- Andrew Baron; Meg Davenport; Lisa Werenko; Sally Blakemore (1998), Circus!: A Pop-Up Adventure, OCLC 39980741
- Andrew Baron; J. R. R. Tolkien; John Howe (1999), The Hobbit: A 3-D Pop-Up Adventure, HarperFestival, OCLC 44927553
- Andrew Baron; Kathy Kelly (2000), Menopop: A Menopause Pop-Up & Activity Book, Fill 'er Up Productions, OCLC 52931880
- Andrew Baron; Lauren Child (2001), My Dream Bed: Loads of Tabs and Flaps and Wheels and More!, Hodder Children's, OCLC 248161609
- Andrew Baron; Paul O. Zelinsky (2002), Knick-Knack Paddywhack!, Dutton Children’s Books, OCLC 50209496
- Andrew Baron; Jessica DuLong; Robert Sabuda; Roy Ziegler; Alan D. Boehm (2004), A Celebration of Pop-Up and Movable Books: 10th Anniversary Special Limited Edition, Movable Book Society, OCLC 56771276
- Andrew Baron; Drew Foerster; Bret Blizzard; Michael Voelker (2011), Acuity's Storybook Year: Annual Report, 2010, Acuity, insurance company, OCLC 708361390

== Exhibitions ==
Year	Title	Location	Notes
2012	Pop! The Arthur J. Williams Pop-up Collection	Florida Atlantic University, Wimberly Library	Also included David A. Carter, James Diaz, Harold Lentz
2012	Pop-Up! Illustration in 3-D	Brandywine River Museum, Chadds Ford, PA	Items drew largely from the collection of Ann Montanaro Staples, founder of The Movable Book Society
2011	The Harold M. Goralnick Pop-Up Book Collection: An Exhibition	Bowdoin College Library, Brunswick, Maine	The collection holds over 1,900 volumes, including works by Baron.
2010	Paper Engineering: Fold, Pull, Pop and Turn	Smithsonian Institution Libraries, National Museum of American History	Also included Matthew Reinhart, Bruce Foster, Chuck Fischer
2004	Show Me a Story: Children’s Books and the Technology of Enchantment	San Francisco Center for the Book	Exhibit includes inside view of the production of Knick-Knack Paddywhack!
