= Vic Duppa-Whyte =

- Born: Victor Vernon Duppa-Whyte; 12 January 1934; Rhodesia, southern Africa.
- Died: 29 January 1986 (aged 52); Colombia, South America.
- Education: Ealing Art College
- Occupations: Paper engineer, Graphic designer
- Spouse: Glenys Duppa-Whyte

Vic Duppa-Whyte (1934–1986) was a British paper engineer and author for pop-up books.

Born in Southern Africa, Duppa-Whyte moved to the United Kingdom before attending college. After graduating from the Ealing Art College in London, he started designed promotional items and packaging for companies.

In 1969, Duppa-Whyte started creating children's books with pop-up inserts to fulfill a contract. By 1983, he started concentrating on these books, producing them on the human body, the US Space Shuttle, Halley's Comet, and the British Royal family. Duppa-Whyte also taught three dimensional art at Kingston Polytechnic in London.

Duppa-Whyte died in 1986 in South America.

== Influence ==
Paper engineer David A. Carter recalled his friendship with Duppa-Whyte, “...while I was in London, I spent some time with him in his studio. He showed me all of his work and we talked a lot...He was another John Strejan-type paper engineer...Vic would show me things off the shelf and the paper engineering was just incredible – the things he would make happen. He was working on The War of the Worlds, which has never been published, but he actually had the spaceship floating in the air. It had a couple of little tiny pieces supporting it, but it was floating in the air. It was just incredible! "

Paper engineer Graham Brown once noted his favorite paper engineer was Duppa-Whyte, “...I worked with [him] on The Legend of King Arthur and the Round Table. I enjoyed the collaboration greatly because he was a brilliant paper engineer and a very laid-back guy. Unfortunately, he died before it was completed.... In my opinion he was probably the most original and creative paper engineer around."

== Selected biography ==
Ann Montanaro’s reference book, Pop-Up and Movable Books, lists more than a dozen pop-up books by Duppa-White.

- Duppa-Whyte, Victor (1970), The Frightful Toffee Apple, Littlehampton Book Services Ltd, OCLC 498236402
- Duppa-Whyte, Victor; Moore, Patrick; Couper, Heather; Doherty, Paul (1985), Halley's Comet Pop-Up Book, Bonanza Pop-Up Books, OCLC 12871031
- Duppa-Whyte, Victor; Pelham, David; Miller, Jonathan; Willock, Harry; Rosendale, David (1983), The Human Body, Viking Press, OCLC 9911207
- Duppa-Whyte, Victor (1976), Incredible Paper Machines, Ward Lock, OCLC 16365162
- Duppa-Whyte, Victor; McCaughrean, Geraldine; Williams, Nick; Johnston, Damian (1986), The Legend of King Arthur and the Round Table, Starlight Editions, OCLC 54668384
- Duppa-Whyte, Victor (1969), The Magic Train – A Novelty Pop-up Book, B. P. C. Publishing, ISBN 036101144X
- Duppa-Whyte, Victor (1970), Odd-Goblin, Littlehampton Book Services Ltd, OCLC 498236439
- Duppa-Whyte, Victor; Stevenson, Robert Louis (1969), Pirate Treasure: A Novelty Pop-up Book, B.P.C. Pub., OCLC 49612235
- Duppa-Whyte, Victor; Montague-Smith, Patrick; Payne, Roger (1984), The Royal Family Pop-Up Book, Bounty Books, OCLC 11566618
- Duppa-Whyte, Victor; Moore, Patrick; Stimpson, Tom (1983), The Space Shuttle Action Book, Random House, OCLC 11400050
- Duppa-Whyte, Victor; Hawkins, Colin (1984), Take Away Monsters, Putnam, OCLC 9197311
- Duppa-Whyte, Victor; Johnston, Damian; Pastor, Terry (1986), The Transformers Pop-Up Book, OCLC 59889544

== Collection ==
The Vic Duppa-Whyte, paper engineer, papers, ca.1940 – 1986, are held at the Archive of Art and Design, Victoria & Albert Museum., ca. 500 files.

== Exhibitions ==
Year	Title	Location	Notes
2001	Pop-Up, Peek, Push, Pull... : An Exhibition of Movable Books and Ephemera from the Collection of Geraldine Roberts Lebowitz of Boca Raton, Florida	Broward County Library's Bienes Center for the Literary Arts, Fort Lauderdale, FL	Also included Renée Jablow, Lothar Meggendorfer, Ib Penick
2010	Paper Engineering: Fold, Pull, Pop and Turn	Smithsonian Institution Libraries, National Museum of American History	Also included Matthew Reinhart, Bruce Foster, Chuck Fischer
