= Movable Book Society =

Nonprofit organization centered on movable books

The Movable Book Society (MBS) is a nonprofit organization which provides a forum for artists, book sellers, book producers, collectors, curators, and others to share enthusiasm and exchange information about pop-up and movable books. The Society has nearly 450 members worldwide.

== History ==
In 1993, Rutgers University librarian Ann R. Montanaro published Pop-up and Movable Books: A Bibliography. The volume of correspondences from collectors who purchased the book convinced Montanaro that there was abundant interest in movable books to form an organization of collectors, and thus she founded The Movable Book Society later that year. MBS hosts opportunities for members to meet in person and publishes a quarterly newsletter.

== Publications ==
Movable Stationery: Movable Stationery is a quarterly publication featuring articles about movable and pop-up book history and collecting, surveys and reviews of new titles, information about exhibits, workshops and profiles of collectors and paper engineers. Digitized back issues (1993 – 2013) are available from the Smithsonian Libraries as well as the Internet Archive.

Brooklyn Pops Up: In 2000, the MBS and the Brooklyn Public Library created an exhibit called “Brooklyn Pops Up! The History and Art of the Movable Book” and published Brooklyn Pops Up, a pop-up book featuring eight Brooklyn landmarks designed by paper engineers such as David A. Carter, Carla Dijs, Bruce Foster, Kees Moerbeek, Robert Sabuda, Ken Wilson-Max and others. Maurice Sendak did the cover art which was made movable by Matthew Reinhart. Brooklyn Pops Up is in its 5th printing.

The Movable Book Society: A Celebration of Pop-up and Movable Books: Published in 2004, the commemorative, limited edition book explores 700 years of movable book history and contains 11 full-color pop-ups and movables, including reproductions from historical paper engineers such as Geraldine Clyne, Dean & Son, S. Louis Giraud, Vojtěch Kubašta, Harold B. Lentz, Lothar Meggendorfer, Ernest Nister, Matthew Paris, Ib Penick, Robert Sayer, and Julian Wehr.

A to Z: Marvels in Paper Engineering: In 2018, the Movable Book Society published a special collection of 26 individual pop-up cards to commemorate its 25th anniversary. Each card represented a unique letter from the English alphabet and was designed by paper engineers from the U.S. and abroad.

The Movable Stationery Index: Navigating the Movable Book Society Newsletters 1993-2020: An official guide to 111 past issues. The organization's newsletters chronicled newly published pop-up books, profiled paper engineers and collectors, described technicalities of toy book innovations and showcased book exhibitions. The index includes five sections to search topics: by a person's name, by publisher, by pop-up or movable book title, by event or other topics.

== Conferences ==
Every two years, since 1996, the Movable Book Society meets in person for a multi-day conference. Past events have been held in Los Angeles, Salt Lake City, New York City, Philadelphia and Boston. Past speakers have included various paper engineers and book artists, such as Sally Blakemore, Julie Chen (book artist), Chuck Fischer, Theo Gielen, Colette Fu, Edward H. Hutchins, Paul Johnson.

== Awards and grants ==
The Movable Book Society presents awards at its biennial conferences:

Meggendorfer Prize for the Best Paper Engineering – Trade Publications: Named in honor of Lothar Meggendorfer (1847–1925), a legendary 19th century illustrator and movable books paper engineer. This award is given for the most outstanding commercially published pop-up or movable book issues in the two proceedings years.

Meggendorfer Prize - Best Paper Engineering – Trade Publications
Year	Conference location	Paper engineer	Pop-up/movable book title	Publisher
2023	Cleveland, OH	David A. Carter and James Diaz	The Complexities of Pop-Up: A Pop-Up Book for Aspiring Paper Engineers	Poposition Press
2021	Denver, CO	Wang Wei	Opening the Forbidden City	
2018	Kansas City, MO	Simon Arizpe	Zahhak: Legend of the Serpent King	Fantagraphics Books
2016	Boston, MA	Shawn Sheehy	Welcome to the Neighborwood	Candlewick Press
2014	Philadelphia, PA	Matthew Reinhart	Transformers: The Ultimate Pop-up Universe	LB Kids
2012	Salt Lake City, UT	Ray Marshall	Paper Blossoms	Chronicle Books
2010	Portland, OR	Marion Bataille	ABC3D	Roaring Brook Press
2008	Washington, DC	Matthew Reinhart	Star Wars-Pop-up Guide to the Galaxy	Orchard Books, Scholastic
2006	Chicago, IL	David A. Carter	One Red Dot: A Pop-up for Children of All Ages	Little Simon, Simon & Schuster
2004	San Diego, CA	Andrew (Andy) Baron	Knick-Knack Paddywhack!	Dutton Children's Books
2002	Milwaukee, WI	Robert Sabuda	The Wonderful Wizard of Oz: A Classic Collectible	Little Simon, Simon & Schuster
2000	New York City	Robert Sabuda	Cookie Count: A Tasty Pop-up	Little Simon, Simon & Schuster
1998	Los Angeles, CA	Robert Sabuda	The Christmas Alphabet	Orchard Books
1996	New Brunswick, NJ	no award given		

Meggendorfer Prize for Artist Books: This prize honors the best pop-up and movable artist book created in the past three years.

Meggendorfer Prize for Artist Books
Year	Conference location	Recipient	Title	Publisher
2023	Cleveland, OH	Hiromi Takeda	Orchids	
2021	Denver, CO	Paul Johnson	The Lemon Tree	
2018	Kansas City, MO	Colette Fu	Tao Hua Yuan Ji	
2016	Boston, MA	Graham Patten	Call Me Trimtab	
2014	Philadelphia, PA	Dorothy A. Yule	Memories of Science	Left Coast Press

Emerging Paper Engineer Prize: This honor recognizes excellence in paper engineering among undergraduate and/or graduate students.

Emerging Paper Engineer Prize
Year	Conference location	Recipient	Pop-up/movable book title	Educational institution
2023	Cleveland, OH	April Serna Capalungan (aka APRL)	A Tail's Tale	University of Philippines
2021	Denver, CO	Tito Perilla	Nuestras Casitas Carcacol (Our little snail houses)	Fundación Universitaria del Área Andina, Bogota, Colombia
2018	Kansas City, MO	Vanessa Yusuf	Bhinneka Tunggal Ika: A Pop-up book of 10 Indonesian Public Holidays	Institute of Technology, Bandung, Indonesia
2018	Kansas City, MO	Sandy Horsley (Honorable Mention)	Pause	Cambridge School of Art, Cambridge, England
2018	Kansas City, MO	Amy Nayve (Honorable Mention)	Popfolio	College of Saint Benilde, Manila, Philippines
2016	Boston, MA	Nicholas Danish	Waterbirds of Michigan: Pop-Up Book	College for Creative Studies, Detroit, MI
2014	Philadelphia, PA	Kimberly Maher	Crooked	University of Iowa, Iowa City, IA

MBS Lifetime Achievement Award: This honor recognizes an individual who has made significant contributions to the field of movable books.

MBS Lifetime Achievement Award
Year	Conference location	Recipient	Contributions
2023	Cleveland, OH	Tor Lokvig and James Diaz	Honored as "landmark paper-engineers - whose vision and innovation helped spark the second golden age of pop-up books".
2000	New York City	Waldo Hunt, Intervisual Books	Honored for "ushering in the Second Golden Age of Pop-ups".

== Exhibitions ==
The Movable Book Society has sponsored various exhibitions over the years:

• Stand & Deliver: Engineering Sculpture Into a Book Format, 2004, curated by Edward Hutchins. The exhibit, co-sponsored with the Brookfield Craft Center, was held at various locations including San Diego Mesa College, Wimberly Library at Florida Atlantic University, the Denver Public Library and Columbia College Chicago Center for Book and Paper Arts. A catalog and interactive CD were published.

• Pop-Up Books from the Collection of the Movable Book Society, 2001, Great Hall of the Westport Library, Westport, CT

• Brooklyn Pops Up! The History and Art of the Movable Book, 2000, Brooklyn Public Library. The exhibition began at the Central Library, before touring 24 neighborhood branches. "The Brooklyn Public Library has spent more than $70,000 in state grants to organize Brooklyn Pops Up an elaborate exhibition featuring more than 100 pop-ups or movable books... [the exhibit catalog] nearly sold out its first printing of more than 16,500."
