= Simon Arizpe =

American artist

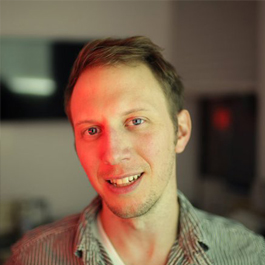
Simon Arizpe, Illustrator and Paper Engineer

Simon Arizpe is an illustrator and paper engineer.

== Life ==
Simon Arizpe is a graduate of the Pratt Institute and resides in Brooklyn, New York.

== Career ==
Simon Arizpe served as the senior paper engineer and illustrator for the studios of Robert Sabuda and Matthew Reinhart for a decade. He has worked on over 40 pop-up books. Simon is a visiting instructor at the Pratt Institute and teaches at Parsons School of Design in New York City. He is the recipient of the 2018 Meggendorfer Prize. His pop up book "The Wild" has been made part of the collection of the Cooper Hewitt, Smithsonian Design Museum library.

== Awards and honors ==
- Meggendorfer Prize for Best Paper Engineer for "Zahhak:The Legend of the Serpent King"
- Award of Excellence, Society of Illustrators, New York, NY, 2013
- Award of Excellence, Museum of Comic and Cartoon Art, New York, NY, 2013
