= MoCCA Festival =

Alternative comics festival

- Status: Active
- Genre: Comics
- Venue: Puck Building (2002–2008); 69th Regiment Armory (2009–2014); Center548 (2015); Metropolitan West (2016–2019); Metropolitan Pavilion (2022- )
- Locations: New York City, U.S.
- Country: United States
- Inaugurated: 2002
- Organizer: Museum of Comic and Cartoon Art (2002-2012); Society of Illustrators (2013-present)
- Filing status: Not-for-profit
- Website: www.moccafest.org

The MoCCA Arts Festival, or MoCCA Fest, is an independent comics showcase that typically includes artist booths, slide shows, and educational panels. It was created by the Museum of Comic and Cartoon Art in 2002 by bringing together over 2,000 artists, publishers, editors and enthusiasts. It was named "Best Small-Press Comics Nexus Anywhere" by The Village Voice.

Since 2013, the MoCCA Fest is produced by the Society of Illustrators, following their acquisition of the Museum the previous year.

== History ==
The MoCCA Festival was held at New York's historic Puck Building from 2002 to 2008. The MoCCA Festival hosted the comics industry's 2004 and 2005 Harvey Awards.

From 2009 to 2014, MoCCA Fest took place at the 69th Regiment Armory. The Society of Illustrators took over management of MoCCA Fest beginning with the 2013 show.

In 2015, the event was split between two locations, with the exhibitors in Center548, and the programming at the High Line Hotel. Plans to convert Center548 to a residential property forced the Society to find new venues, and beginning in 2016 Metropolitan West hosted the exhibitors, with programming taking place at Ink48.

The 2020 Festival was cancelled due to the COVID-19 pandemic.

The 2021 Festival was held as an online only event with six days of virtual events.

In 2022, the Society of Illustrators announced plans to hold the event in-person at a new venue, Metropolitan Pavilion in New York City's Chelsea neighborhood.

=== Dates and locations ===
- June 23, 2002 (Puck Building)
- June 22, 2003 (Puck Building) — guests include Jessica Abel, Signe Baumane, Amanda Conner, Howard Cruse, Evan Dorkin, Phoebe Gloeckner, Klaus Janson, Denis Kitchen, James Kochalka, Peter Kuper, Jason Little, Patrick McDonnell, Mike Mignola, Bill Plympton, Ted Rall, Jeff Smith, Art Spiegelman, and Craig Thompson
- June 26–27, 2004 (Puck Building) — event expands to two days
- June 11–12, 2005 (Puck Building)
- June 10–11, 2006 (Puck Building)
- June 23–24, 2007 (Puck Building)
- June 7–8, 2008 (Puck Building)
- June 6–7, 2009 (69th Regiment Armory)
- April 10–11, 2010 (69th Regiment Armory)
- April 9–10, 2011 (69th Regiment Armory)
- April 28–29, 2012 (69th Regiment Armory) — guest of honor: P. Craig Russell
- April 6–7, 2013 (69th Regiment Armory) — first under the administration of the Society of Illustrators
- April 5–6, 2014 (69th Regiment Armory)
- April 11–12, 2015 (Center548 [exhibitors], High Line Hotel [programming]) — guests of honor: Aline Kominsky-Crumb, Scott McCloud, Raina Telgemeier, J. H. Williams III
- April 2–3, 2016 (Metropolitan West [exhibitors], Ink48 [programming]) — guests of honor: Cece Bell, R.O. Blechman, Phoebe Gloeckner, Sonny Liew, Rebecca Sugar.
- April 1–2, 2017 (Metropolitan West [exhibitors], Ink48 [programming]) — guests of honor: Blutch, Cliff Chiang, Becky Cloonan, Drew Friedman, David Lloyd, Gene Luen Yang.
- April 7–8, 2018 (Metropolitan West [exhibitors], Ink48 [programming])
- April 6–7, 2019 (Metropolitan West [exhibitors], Ink48 [programming])
- April 4–5, 2020 (Metropolitan West [exhibitors], Ink48 [programming]) — CANCELLED DUE TO COVID-19 PANDEMIC
- April 2–3, 2022 (Metropolitan Pavilion)
- April 1–2, 2023 (Metropolitan Pavilion)
- March 16-17, 2024 (Metropolitan Pavilion)
- March 15-16, 2025 (Metropolitan Pavilion)

== Awards ==
=== MoCCA Festival Award/Klein Award (2002 - 2012) ===
Presented to an artist whose outstanding work elevated the comic art form. In 2009, the MoCCA Festival Award was renamed the Klein Award in honor of MoCCA founder Lawrence Klein.

- 2002: Jules Feiffer
- 2003: Art Spiegelman
- 2004: Roz Chast
- 2005: Neal Adams
- 2006: Gahan Wilson
- 2007: Alison Bechdel
- 2008: Bill Plympton
- 2009: Jerry Robinson
- 2010: David Mazzucchelli
- 2011: Al Jaffee
- 2012: Gary Panter

=== MoCCA Arts Festival Awards of Excellence (2013 - present) ===
Under the administration of The Society of Illustrators, the Klein Award was replaced in 2013 with the MoCCA Arts Festival Awards of Excellence, intended to recognize the most outstanding work on view at the festival. Artists winning this award are acknowledged with an Award of Excellence and have their work exhibited at the Museum of Comic and Cartoon Art at the Society of Illustrators. All materials chosen in the jury's initial survey will be acquired by Columbia University's Rare Book and Manuscript Library for a newly established MoCCA Arts Festival collection, to be expanded annually.

==== 2013 recipients ====
- Gregory Benton (B+F)
- Kim Ku (Ghost Hotel)
- Jane Mai (Sunday in the Park with Boys)
- Nicholas T. Offerman (Nick Offerman) for the comic Revenant
- Kenan Rubenstein (Last Train to Old Town)
- Andrea Tsurumi (Andrew Jackson Throws a Punch)
- Honorable Mention: Simon Arizpe (OHaBEAR)

The winning artists' work was exhibited in the second floor MoCCA gallery at the Society of Illustrators May 21-July 6, 2013.

Judges for the 2013 MoCCA Arts Festival Awards of Excellence included Karen Berger, Gary Groth, Nora Krug, David Mazzucchelli, and Paul Pope.

==== 2014 recipients ====
- Alexandra Beguez (Narwhal)
- Luke Healy (Of the Monstrous Pictures of Whales)
- Greg Kletsel (Exercise the Demon)
- David Plunkert (Heroical)
- Jess Ruliffson (Invisible Wounds)

The winning artists' work was exhibited in the second floor MoCCA gallery at the Society of Illustrators April 29-May 17, 2014.

Judges for the 2014 MoCCA Arts Festival Awards of Excellence included Gregory Benton (2013 recipient), Tracy Hurren, Chip Kidd, Chris Pitzer, and James Sturm.

==== 2015 recipients ====
- Tyler Boss (Swimmers)
- Keren Katz (Humdrum No.1/ 2015)
- Greg Kletsel (Conceptual Bar Mitzvah Video)
- Kris Mukai (Commuter)
- Daniel Zender (Nope)

The winning artists' work was exhibited in the second floor MoCCA gallery at the Society of Illustrators July 27-August 15, 2015.

Judges for the 2015 MoCCA Arts Festival Awards of Excellence included Charles Burns, Annie Koyama, David Plunkert (2014 recipient), Andrea Tsurumi (2013 recipient) and Alexandra Zsigmond.

==== 2016 recipients ====
- Glynnis Fawkes (Alle Ego)
- Pat Dorian (Lon Chaney Talks Part 2)
- Shreyas R. Krishnan (Becoming Rosie)
- Kate Lacour (Vivisectionary II)
- R. Sikoryak (iTunes Terms and Conditions)

The winning artists' work was exhibited in the second floor MoCCA gallery at the Society of Illustrators May 3-June 4, 2016.

Judges for the 2016 MoCCA Arts Festival Awards of Excellence included Calista Brill, Cliff Chiang, Charles Kochman, Mark Newgarden, and Lauren Weinstein.
