= WhirlGirl =

1997 Web series

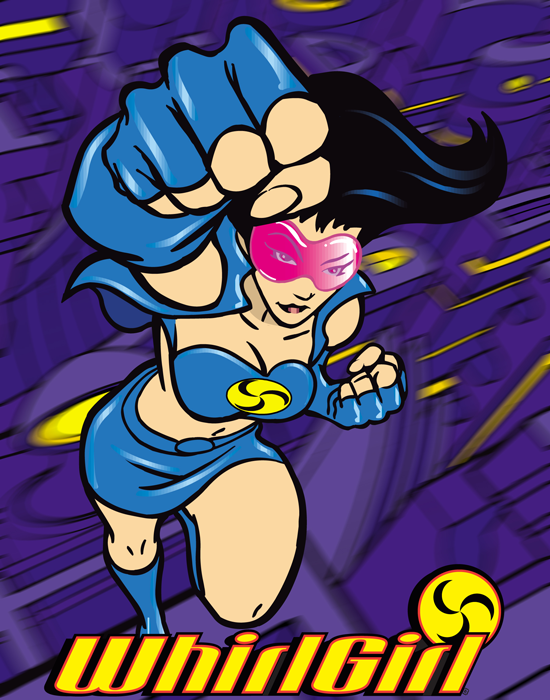
- Genre: Science fiction Comedy; Action; Romance; Superhero
- Created by: David B. Williams
- Developed by: Danny Fingeroth; Jason Fruchter; Betsy Hooper; Ephraim Kehlmann; Joel Rodgers
- Written by: Betsy Hooper; Gregg Ostrin
- Voices of: Kim Campoli; David DiLeo; Jonathan Ellinghaus; Moe Fischer; Lani Ford; Betsy Hooper; Kathleen Hubbard; Kristen Johanssen; Jennifer Richards; Angela Tweed; Sara Van Beckum
- Theme music composer: James Avatar
- Country of origin: United States
- Original language: English

Production
- Executive producers: Buzz Potamkin; David B. Williams
- Producers: Glenn Ginsburg; Christine Jones Howard; Ephraim Kehlmann
- Production company: Visionary Media

WhirlGirl debuted in 1997 as a sci-fi web series about a reluctant superheroine battling an evil "mediatech" empire in 2077 Southern California. The title character—dubbed "a real revolutionary for a virtual age"—balanced freedom-fighting with realistic personal concerns like dating and having friends.

Initially launched as a webcomic with light animation and short bursts of music and sound effects, WhirlGirl ultimately became the first regularly scheduled web series using Flash animation, and went on to achieve a variety of other industry firsts over a 100-webisode career: including syndication partnerships with major websites, a distribution partnership with a premium cable network, a web television simulcast, cross-media advertising campaigns, and licensing and merchandising agreements.

== Characters ==
Kia Cross is the only daughter of mid-21st century revolutionary leader Morgan Cross. After Morgan was captured and destroyed by forces working for ZoneWerks, an evil media/technology corporation run by Ty Harden, Kia was brainwashed and dispatched to a life of quiet servitude. Flash forward: Years later, as the programming wears off, Kia recalls her mother's work and transforms herself into a superheroine. Armed with a trademark weapon (the whirlblade) and a signature fighting move (the spin kick), she resumes the fight for freedom.

WhirlGirl's allies include Stekatta "Kat" Tressner, a stylish gear-head with a thing for WhirlGirl, and teenager Sid X, who can control computers telepathically with a "cybernetic crystal" implanted in his forehead. Victoria Thalios leads the "FreeVox" rebel group, which WhirlGirl often defends.

WhirlGirl's primary foe, Ty Harden, not only runs the evil ZoneWerks empire; he is also Sid X's estranged father. Harden relies on Axxen Baines, a sadist who heads the ZoneWerks security apparatus.

== Guest characters ==
In a September 1999 webisode, magicians Penn & Teller appeared as animated versions of themselves in a futuristic Las Vegas.

In May 2000, WhirlGirl teamed up with the hero of the SciFi (now Syfy) Channel's Barbarian Moron cartoon in a series of webisodes that appeared on both the Showtime and SciFi websites.

== Animation ==
Created by David B. Williams and produced by Visionary Media, the studio he founded, WhirlGirl launched at a Spring 1997 trade show. Because high-speed broadband access at home was very rare in 1997, and rich media could take minutes to load with a dial-up connection, the series consisted of comic-book-style panels livened up with animated GIFs (minimal animation elements) and looping music and sound effects. In August 1998, using Macromedia's new Flash 2.0 animation software, WhirlGirl replaced its comic-strip panels with five-minute-long webisodes, becoming one of the first animated web series.

== Distribution ==
Even before the series was fully animated, Visionary signed online syndication deals with five affiliates, and WhirlGirl debuted in March 1998 on BMG's BUGjuice, E-Pub's Amused, ICL's GamesZone, Microsoft's WebTV Networks, and Canada's BeyondTV. That July, the site began running on Lycos as well.

In January 1999, Showtime licensed WhirlGirl for online and on-air use, making it the first regularly scheduled animated web series and the first independently produced web series licensed by a national television network. Showtime's parent company, Viacom, took an undisclosed equity stake in Visionary Media. All 100 episodes were also dubbed into Spanish and distributed on Yupi, one of the first major Spanish-language online networks.

== Convergence ==
On February 27, 1999, the series helped advance web-TV convergence by being the first animated webisode to premiere simultaneously on a TV channel and its website—in this case, Showtime and SHO.com. WhirlGirl went on to appear in 100 weekly webisodes through March 2001, with the character making occasional appearances on the TV channel as, for example the "host" of a programming block called "Lethal Ladies."

== Marketing ==
In July 1997, WhirlGirl became the first web series promoted with a traditional TV ad campaign that included high-profile spots in major markets. In 1999, Showtime supported WhirlGirl with a million-dollar multimedia marketing campaign featuring billboards and other outdoor ads in major U.S. markets, as well as full-page ads in major magazines.

WhirlGirl also appeared on the SciFi (now Syfy) Channel as part of the Barbarian Moron stunt, and in June 1999 became the first non-MTV property to be represented for licensing and merchandising by MTV Networks (another Viacom property).

In 2000, toy maker ReSaurus unveiled a WhirlGirl action figure at Toy Fair, but the toy was not brought to market.
