= Arie Kaplan =

American writer and comedian

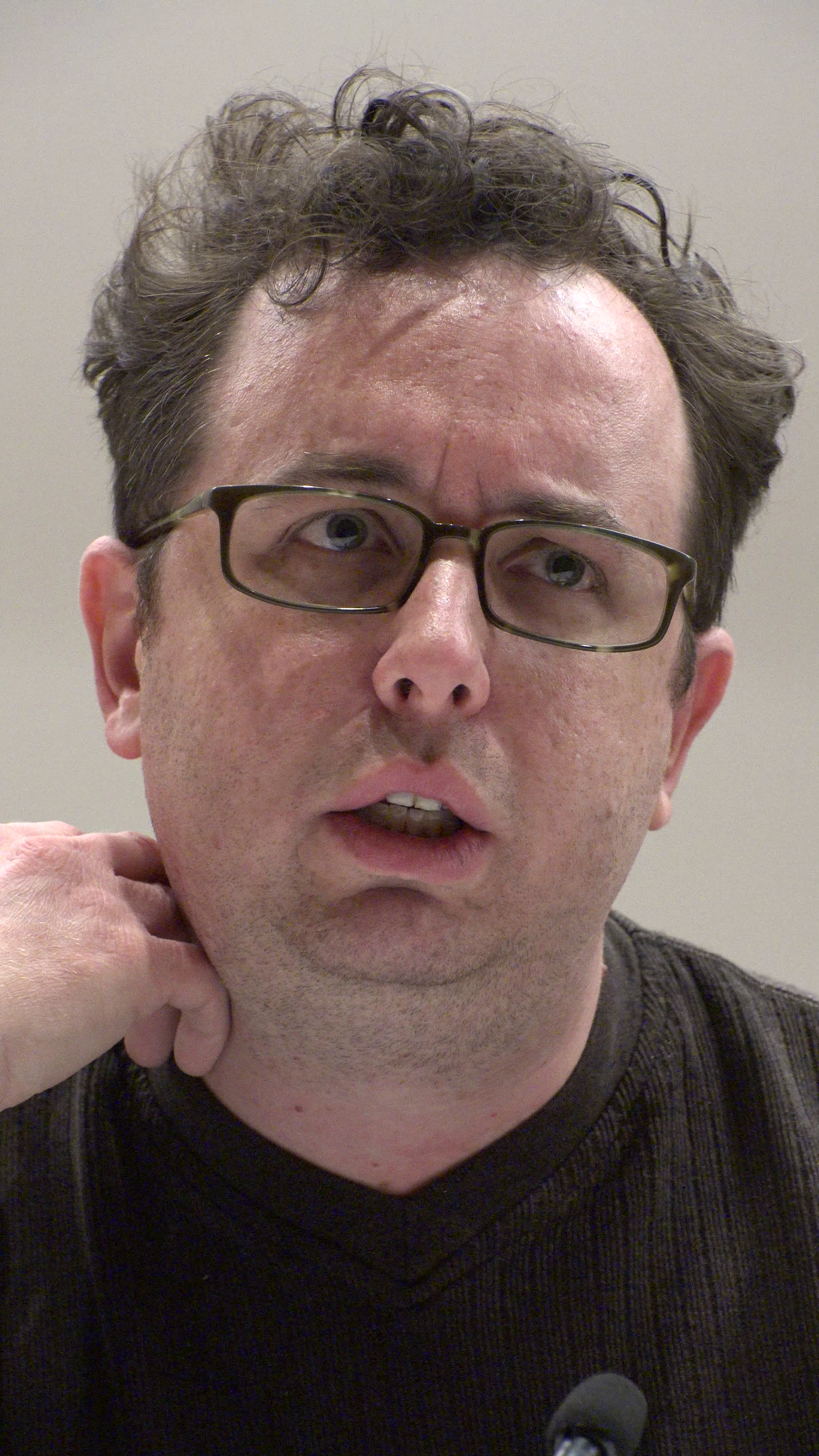
- Kaplan at the New School University Center in New York City.
- Area: Writer
- Spouse: Nadine Graham (m. 2004)

Arie Kaplan is an American writer and comedian. He is the author of the book Masters of the Comic Book Universe Revealed!, and a writer for Mad magazine. He lives in New York City.

== Career ==
Although he is also a comedian and a cartoonist, Arie Kaplan is best known as a writer. Kaplan has written for Teen Beat, Tiger Beat, Entertainment Weekly, Time Out New York, the Utne Reader, and other publications. He has also won acclaim for exploring the role Jews have played in the history of both comedy writing and the comic book industry. Several years ago, Kaplan wrote a three-part series called "Kings of Comics" about Jews in comics for Reform Judaism Magazine. In that series, he interviewed such comics luminaries as Al Jaffee, Stan Lee, Will Eisner, Art Spiegelman, Jerry Robinson, Paul Kupperberg, Trina Robbins, Drew Friedman, Judd Winick, Chris Claremont, Jon Bogdanove, and Joe Kubert. In his role as an entertainment journalist, Kaplan has also interviewed recording artists, comedians, filmmakers, and cartoonists, including R. Kelly, 'N Sync, Carl Reiner, Susie Essman, Larry Gelbart, Sam Gross, Tom Leopold, Nora Ephron, and Lewis Black.

Apart from being a journalist, he is also an in-demand public speaker, lecturing all over the world about various pop culture-related subjects. These include, but are not limited to, the history of comic books, comedy history, film history, the history of television, and the history of science fiction. He has lectured and performed stand-up comedy at resorts, synagogues, comedy clubs, and academic institutions worldwide, including the Nevele Grand Resort in the Catskills, Stand-Up New York in Manhattan, the Skirball Cultural Center in Los Angeles, the Koffler Centre of the Arts in Toronto, the Kislak Vacation Center in the Poconos, the Jewish Culture Festival in Kraków, Poland, and the Jewish Cultural Festival in Trondheim, Norway.

In 2008 Kaplan wrote a Speed Racer comic book mini-series called Speed Racer: Chronicles of the Racer for IDW Publishing. He has also written two Ben 10 comic book scripts for the DC Comics title Cartoon Network Action Pack. He is the writer/creator of the children's comic strip "Dave Danger, Action Kid" which ran in Reform Judaism Magazine from 2005-2007. In 2010, he wrote "Disney Club Penguin: Shadow Guy & Gamma Gal: Heroes Unite" for Grosset & Dunlap. He is currently working on a new graphic novel "The New Kid From Planet Glorf" for Capstone.

Kaplan can also be credited with writing for a various number of comic book series. These include the DC comics title "DC Universe Holiday Special", the DC series "Cartoon Network Action Pack", Bongo Comics anthology "Bart Simpson", Archie Comics title "Archie & Friends" and Papercutz horror series "Tales From the Crypt".

A writer for Mad magazine since 2000, Kaplan has described it as a dream to work for pioneering satire publication. Some of his best-known MAD pieces are the "Gulf Wars Episode 2: Clone of the Attacks" poster, "What if Chris Rock Performed At A Bar Mitzvah?" and "MAD's New 'Sesame Street' Characters That Better Reflect Today's World."

In Masters, Kaplan profiles the lives and careers of a diverse range of icons of the comic book genre, including Stan Lee (Spider-Man); Neil Gaiman (The Sandman); Marjane Satrapi (Persepolis, Art Spiegelman (Maus); Dwayne McDuffie (Static Shock); and Will Eisner (The Spirit). At an event at MoCCA celebrating the release of the book Kaplan was asked what the comic artists he interviewed—such as Eisner, Spiegelman, and Gaiman—have in common. He said that they were "elevating the art" and showing comics to be "art with a capital A." On the panel to discuss Kaplan's work was Jerry Robinson, creator of the Joker; Robert Sikoryak, who does comic adaptations of literature; and Danny Fingeroth, former Spider-Man editor at Marvel Comics and author of "Superman on the Couch: What Superheroes Really Tell Us About Ourselves and Our Society."

Kaplan's book, From Krakow to Krypton: The history of Jews in Comics, came out in Sept 2008 from JPS, with a foreword by American Splendor creator Harvey Pekar and quickly became a National Jewish Book Award finalist that same year. In 2009 it won the Booklist Editors' Choice: Books for Youth, the Sophie Brody Honor Book and was a finalist in the National "Best Books 2009" Award competition. His newest release, "American Pop: Hit Makers, Superstars, and Dance Revolutionaries" was published by Lerner Publishing Group's Twenty-First Century Books imprint in November 2012.

In addition to the above work, Kaplan has also had his hands in the creation of various video games such as Episode 2: Home to Roost of Law & Order: Legacies by Telltale Games. He wrote the storyline and dialogue for all five episodes of House M.D. for Legacy Interactive. Together with Legacy Interactive, Kaplan is currently working on the storyline and dialogue for the upcoming game Disaster Hero, an educational children's game.

== Quotes ==
- "Jews built the comic book industry from the ground up, and the influence of Jewish writers, artists, and editors continues to be felt to this day."

== Personal life ==
On May 30, 2004, Kaplan married playwright Nadine Graham. "I'm very goal-oriented. I pursue something until I've worn it down to a nub. That's what I did with Nadine."
