= Bruce Foster =

American paper engineer and graphic designer

- Education: University of Tennessee
- Occupations: Paper engineer, graphic designer
- Spouse: Lori Stanley
- Children: Nicole, Lydia
- Website: paperpops.com

Bruce Foster is an American paper engineer and graphic designer who specializes in pop-up books. Called a "paper magic master", he has created more than 40 pop-up books for both children and adults, in addition to the pop-up designs that appeared in the 2007 film Enchanted.

== Biography ==
Foster studied fine and studio arts the University of Tennessee. He spent years in designing trade show graphics and, later, as an ad agency creative director.

Foster was inspired to learn how to create 3D books after seeing his first pop-up book, Kees Moerbeek's Hot Pursuit: A Forward and Backward Pop-up Book and taught himself by reverse engineering published books. "I destroyed a lot of them trying to figure out how they were done," he said.

He began a career designing pop-up books as a freelancer for Baltimore book children’s book packager Ottenheimer Publishers.

== Selected bibliography ==
The following is a sample of the pop-up books paper engineered by Bruce Foster:

- Foster, Bruce; Willard, Nancy; Leister, Bryan; Jackson, Bea (1995), Gutenberg's gift, Wild Honey, an Ottenheimer Publishers Company, OCLC 32014043
- Foster, Bruce; Kee, Lucy; Williamson, Andrew (2010), Harry Potter: A Pop-Up Book, Insight Editions, OCLC 555627884
- Foster, Bruce; Weltevrede, Pieter; Wise, Tad; Beer, Robert (2007), Hindu Altars: A Pop-Up Gallery of Traditional Art & Wisdom, New World Library, OCLC 241301654
- Foster, Bruce; Berry, Cheree (2006), Hoorah-- for the Bra: A Perky Peek at the History of the Brassiere, Tabori & Chang, OCLC 63660577
- Foster, Bruce; Rodgers, Richard; Hammerstein, Oscar; Crouse, Russel; Andreasen, Dan; Trapp, Maria Augusta (2009), The Sound of Music: A Classic Collectible Pop-Up, Little Simon, OCLC 180756395
- Foster, Bruce; Eisner, Will (2008), The Spirit of Will Eisner : a pop-up graphic novel, Insight Editions, OCLC 732882001
- Foster, Bruce; Havrilesky, Heather; Coulas, Mick (2006), The Pop-Up Book of Celebrity Meltdowns, Melcher Media, OCLC 76805039
- Foster, Bruce (paper engineer) (2008), Visionaire. 55, Surprise, Visionaire Publishing, OCLC 216939681
- Foster, Bruce (2009), Wow!: The Pop-Up Book of Sports, Time Inc. Home Entertainment, OCLC 320191002

== Exhibitions ==
Year	Title	Location	Notes
2003	Pop-ups: Art of the Paper Engineer	The Sharon Arts Center in Peterborough, NH	Also included work from David A. Carter, Robert Sabuda
2004	Pop-Up Books: The Art of Paper Engineering,	The Museum of Print History, Houston, TX	Also included work by Irene Rosenberg
2010	Paper Engineering: Fold, Pull, Pop and Turn	Smithsonian Institution Libraries, National Museum of American History	Also included Matthew Reinhart, David Hawcock, Chuck Fischer
