= Society of Illustrators =

American professional society

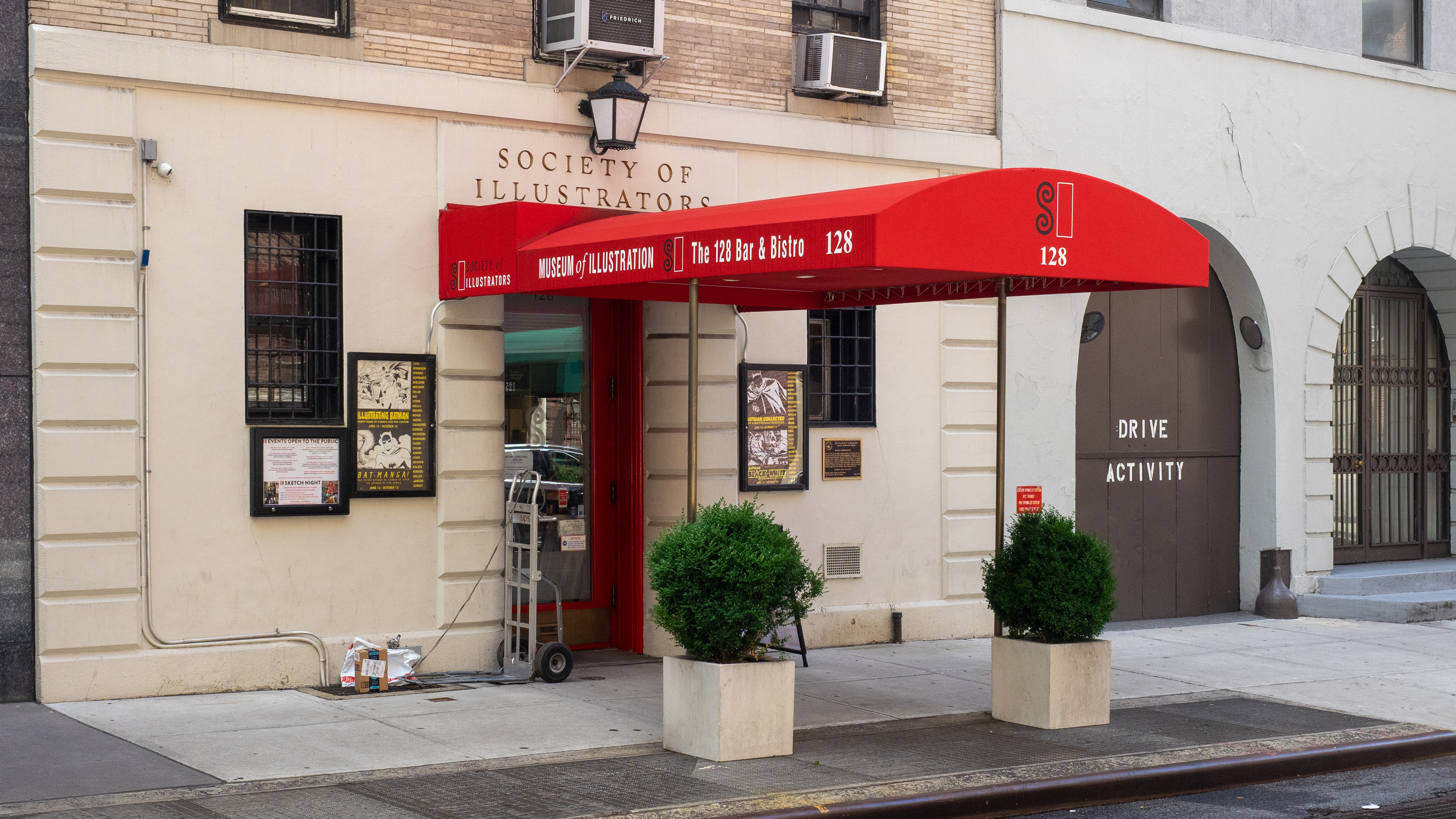
- The society's headquarters in New York City since 1939
- Formation: February 1, 1901; 125 years ago
- Founders: Henry S. Fleming, Otto Henry Bacher, Frank Vincent DuMond, Henry Hutt, Albert Wenzell, Albert Sterner, Benjamin West Clinedinst, F. C. Yohn, Louis Loeb, and Reginald Birch
- Purpose: Encourage high ideals through exhibitions, lectures, education, and by fostering a sense of community and open discussion. Its mission is to promote the art and appreciation of illustration and comics, as well as their history.
- Headquarters: 128 E. 63rd Street; New York City, U.S.
- Coordinates: 40°45′52.56″N 73°58′1.25″W
- Fields: Illustration and Comics
- Executive Director: Arabelle Liepold
- Subsidiaries: Museum of Comic and Cartoon Art
- Website: www.societyillustrators.org

The Society of Illustrators (SoI) is a professional society based in New York City. It was founded in 1901 to promote the art of illustration and, since 1959, has held an annual exhibition.

Since absorbing the Museum of Comic and Cartoon Art (MoCCA) in 2012, the Society has also promoted the art of comics. In addition to its holding exhibitions in its own Museum of American Illustration, the Society holds the annual MoCCA Festival, an independent comics showcase.

== History ==
=== Founding ===
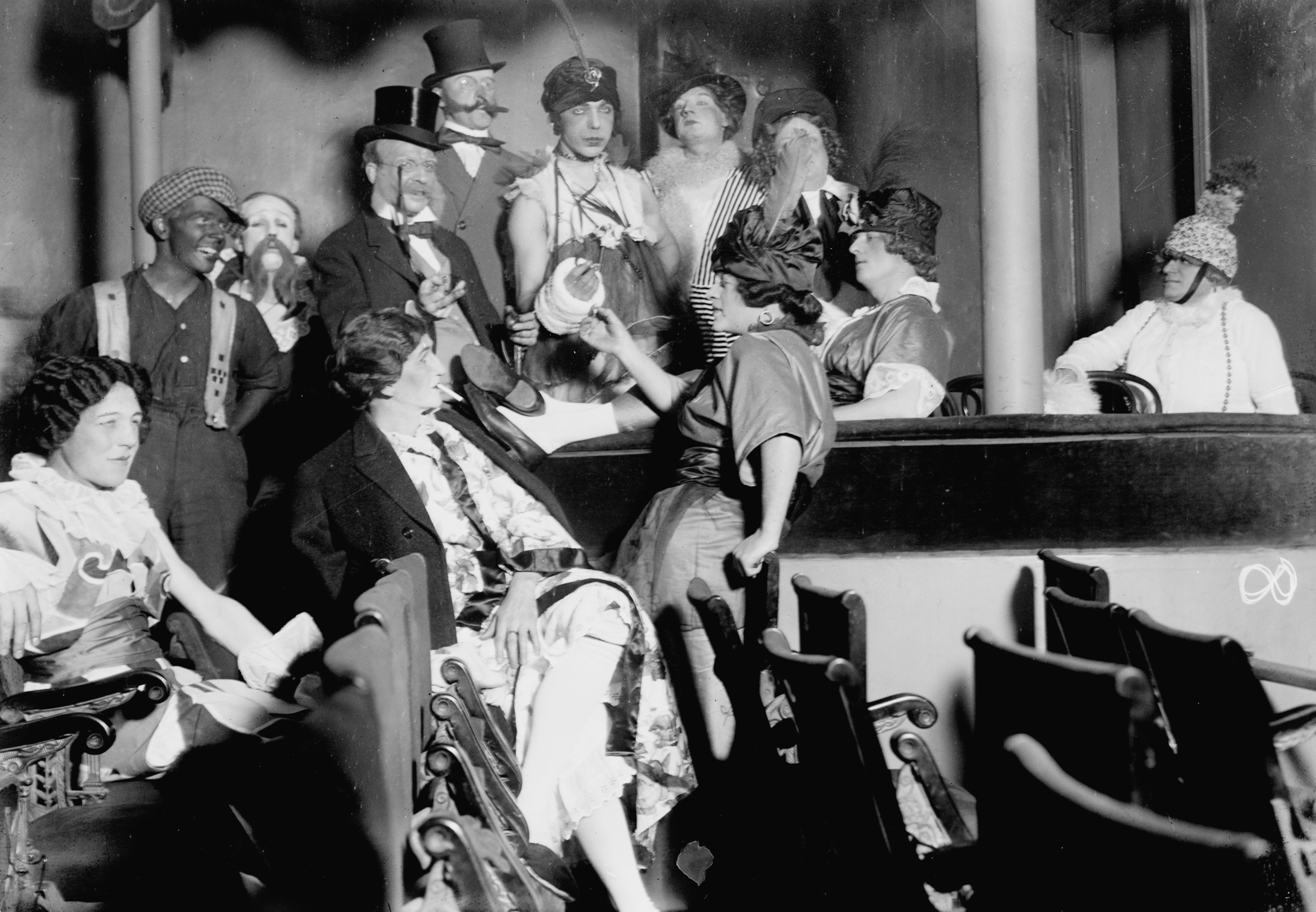
Society of Illustrators members at the Berkeley Theater in Manhattan in 1914

The Society of Illustrators was founded on February 1, 1901, by a group of nine artists and one advising businessman. The advising businessman was Henry S. Fleming, a coal dealer who offered his legal staff to the Society in an advisory role and also served as the Society of Illustrators Secretary and Treasurer for many years. The nine artists who, with Fleming, founded the Society were Otto Henry Bacher, Frank Vincent DuMond, Henry Hutt, Albert Wenzell, Albert Sterner, Benjamin West Clinedinst, F. C. Yohn, Louis Loeb, and Reginald Birch.

The mission statement was "to promote generally the art of illustration and to hold exhibitions from time to time". Women first became part of the organization in 1903, when Elizabeth Shippen Green and Florence Scovel Shinn were named Associate Members; but women were prohibited from full membership until 1922.

=== World War I ===
J. M. Flagg's 1917 poster used to recruit soldiers for both World War I and World War II; Flagg used a modified version of his own face for Uncle Sam, and war veteran Walter Botts provided the pose.

During the World War I years, with Charles Dana Gibson as the acting president, Society members worked through the Committee on Public Information's Division of Pictorial Publicity, creating many original poster designs, including James M. Flagg's US Army iconic recruiting poster of Uncle Sam, as well as advertising of the massive War Bond effort.

Photo journalism was impractical during these years and eight Society members, commissioned Captains in the Engineers, were sent to France to sketch the war.

After the war, the Society operated the School for Disabled Soldiers.

=== Between the wars ===
In 1920, the society was incorporated, and in 1922 women were allowed to become full members. The early history of the society was documented in 1927 and 1939 by Norman Mills Price. His handwritten notes are held in the Society of Illustrators archives.

During the 1920s and 1930s, the Society presented the Illustrator's Shows, featuring artists and their models as actors, songwriters, set designers and painters. Professional talent such as the Cotton Club band and Jimmy Durante also performed. Through member and set designer Watson Barrett, the Illustrator's Show of 1925 was held at the Shubert Theatre, and the Shuberts purchased the rights to the skits for their Broadway productions of Artists and Models. Their December 1935 show was raided by police, who arrested five performing female models on "lewd and indecent performance" charges due to being insufficiently clothed. The case against the women was dismissed.

In 1939, those funds allowed the Society to acquire its present headquarters, at 128 East 63rd Street. Norman Rockwell's Dover Coach became the backdrop for the bar on the fourth floor, donated by Rockwell in honor of the Society's new building. This painting currently hangs in the Members Dining Room.

=== World War II ===
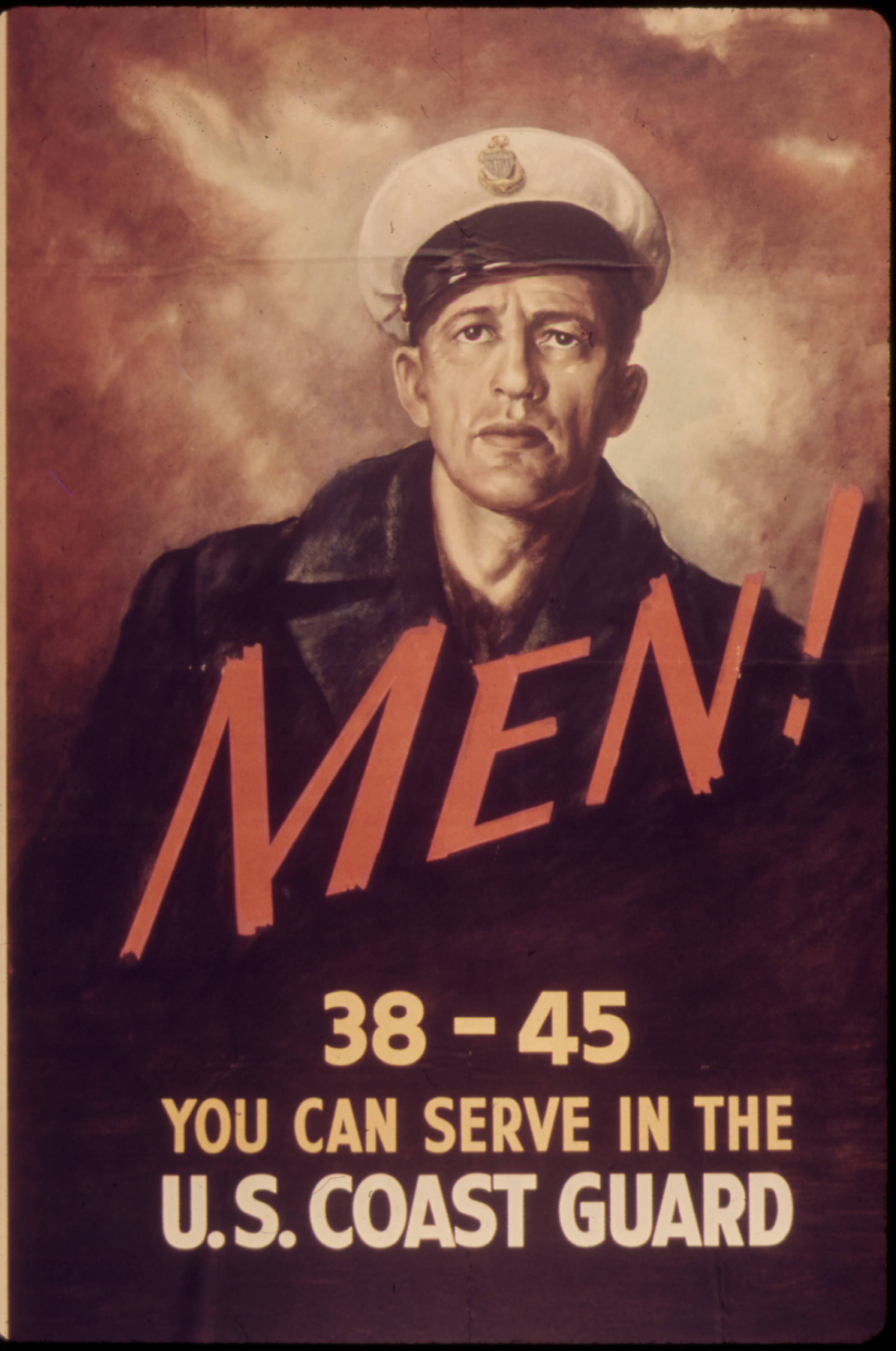
A 1943 poster illustration by society member C.W. Beuttey for the Office of War Information

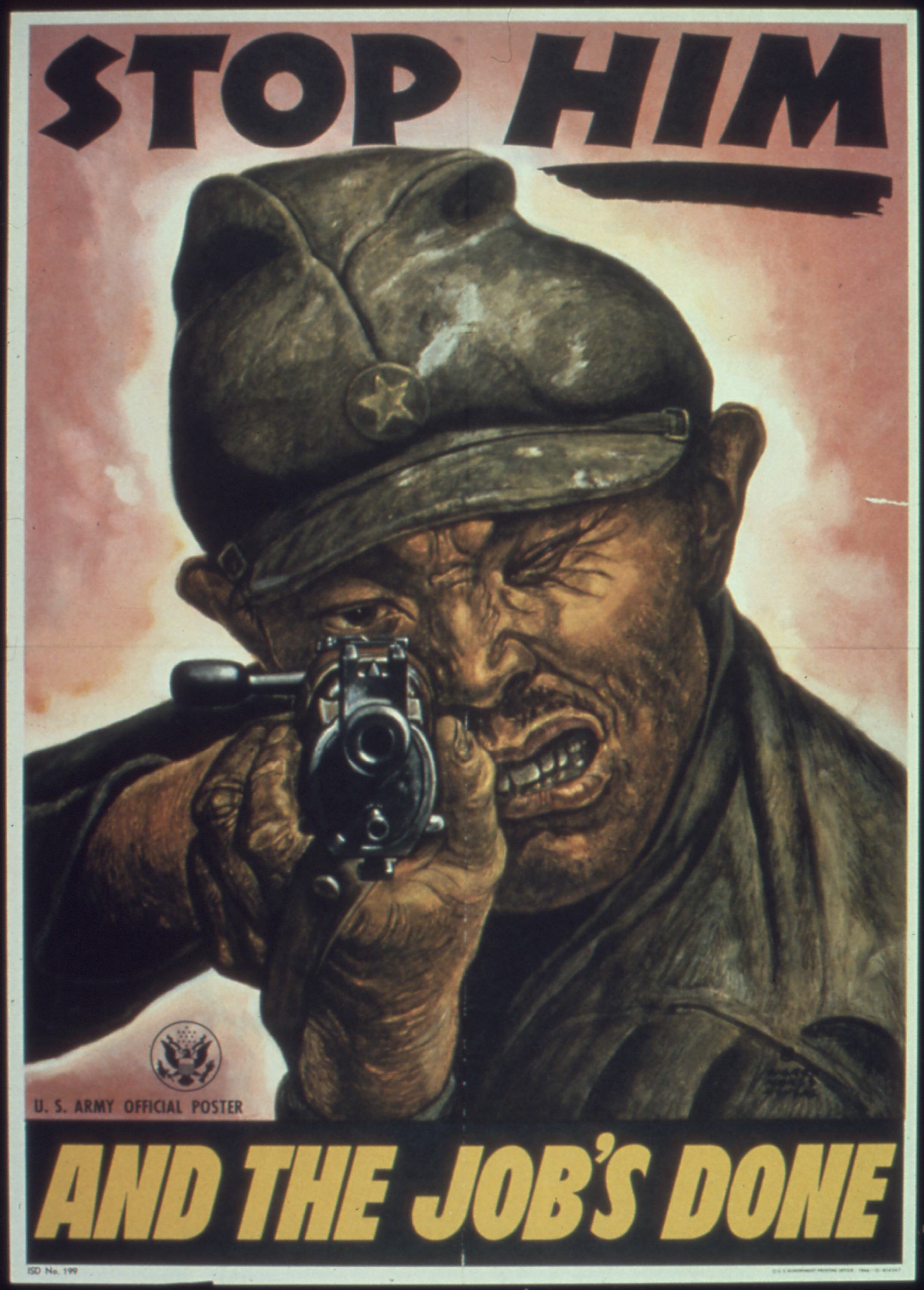
A 1945 poster illustration by society member Harry Morse for the Office of War Information

During World War II, the society again contributed to the war effort with a massive campaign of posters. Society members visited veterans’ hospitals to sketch the wounded, and these artworks were sent to the families to boost morale.

The Illustrator's Jazz Band was formed to entertain the wounded, and an ensemble by the same name plays at Society events up until the present.

=== Post-World War II ===
In 1946, a Welfare Fund for indigent artists was established.

In 1948, the Joint Ethics Committee, of which The Society is a member developed the first Code of Fair Practice, which still serves today in addressing concerns of artists and art directors working in the graphic communications field where abuses and misunderstandings regarding usage rights and ownership of works of illustration and other works of art created for a wide range of public media.

In 1954, the U.S. Air Force began sending Society of Illustrators members around the world to document the Air Force's activities. This program continues today. Thousands of paintings have been contributed over the years.

In 1959, the society held its first Annual Exhibition, juried by Bob Peak, Bradbury Thompson, Stevan Dohanos, and others. It opened with 350 original works of art and led to the publication of the first Illustrators Annual.

The Society opened its doors to the public in 1981, establishing the Museum of American Illustration, with regular public exhibitions.

=== 21st century ===
In 2001, the 100th anniversary of the society's founding, a 12-month celebration began with the U.S. Postal Service issuing the Great American Illustrators. That year was punctuated with the 9/11 Memorial Exhibition, Prevailing Human Spirit.

The Museum of Comic and Cartoon Art (MoCCA) endowed its assets in August 2012 to the society, which has since subsidized the MoCCA Festival.

Anelle Miller was appointed executive director of the society in 2007 and served in that capacity until 2023. She updated the exhibition space, hired new staff, and instituted a slew of programs open to the general public. Arabelle Liepold took the position in June 2023.

The Society of Illustrators maintains an annual of illustration, student scholarship competitions and various awards honoring excellence in the field of illustration. The society has had outreach programs with the New York City Department of Parks and Recreation since 2001, and with the New York City Board of Education since 1999.

== Presidents ==
As of 2023, the president of the Society of Illustrators is Leslie Cober.

Notable past presidents of the Society:

- Charles Dana Gibson (1904–1905, 1909–1920)
- Albert Sterner (1907–1908) — founding member
- George Hand Wright (1926–1927)
- Wallace Morgan (1929–1936)
- Harold von Schmidt (1938–1941)
- Albert Dorne (1947–1948)

== Museum of American Illustration and Exhibitions ==
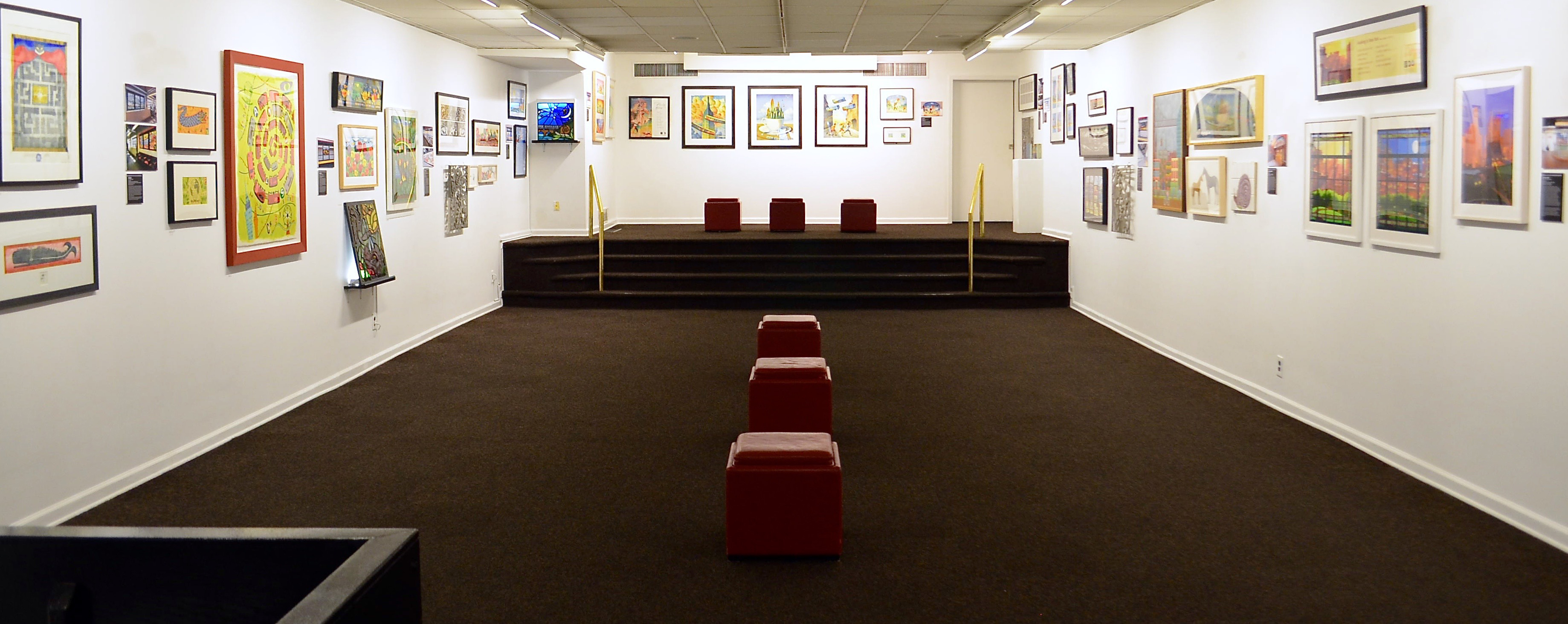
The main upstairs gallery at the Museum of American Illustration in June 2015

The Museum of American Illustration was established at the society in 1981, under the stewardship of John Witt, the society's president. The Society's permanent collection, featuring pieces on rotational display throughout the building, includes nearly 2500 works by such artists as Norman Rockwell, Howard Pyle, N.C. Wyeth, James Montgomery Flagg, Bob Peak, and Bernie Fuchs.

The Museum hosts the Annual Illustration show and smaller topical exhibits related to illustration and comics. In recent years, the main galleries have played host to numerous acclaimed, contemporary, and popular exhibitions including:

- R. Crumb: Lines Drawn on Paper (March 23 - April 11, 2011), curated by Monte Beauchamp.
- Maurice Sendak: A Celebration of the Artist and his Work (June 11 - August 17, 2013), curated by Justin Schiller and Dennis David.
- The ZAP Show (March 2 - May 17, 2016), curated by Monte Beauchamp and Eric Sack.
- Will Eisner: The Centennial Celebration 1917–2017 (March 1 - June 3, 2017).
- The Art of MARCH: A Civil Rights Masterpiece (February 28 - June 30, 2018), curated by John Lind and Charles Brownstein.
- Illustrating Batman: Eighty Years of Comics and Pop Culture (June 12 - October 12, 2019), curated by Rob Pistella, John Lind, and Chip Kidd.

The Society also has a gallery on the second floor dedicated to MoCCA that frequently hosts smaller exhibits of comic book art.

== Recognition ==
The Society of Illustrators inaugurated the Hall of Fame program in 1958, to recognize "distinguished achievement in the art of illustration". The first recipient was Norman Rockwell. Like other recognized artists, he was elected by former Society presidents for his contributions to the field of illustration. Every year since 1958, one or more illustrators have been added to the Hall of Fame. In 2001, two additional forms of recognition were added: Dean Cornwell Recognition Award and the Arthur William Brown Achievement Award, which may be awarded annually.

In 1965, the Society established the Hamilton King Award, which is given annually to one society member.

In 1981, the Society established the Student Scholarship Competition, which has continued annually to the present. The Highest Award presented to a student by the society is the Zankel Scholarship Award, established in 2006 in honor of Arthur Zankel, an advocate for higher education whose bequest made the scholarship possible.
