= Paul Johnson (book artist) =

British book artist

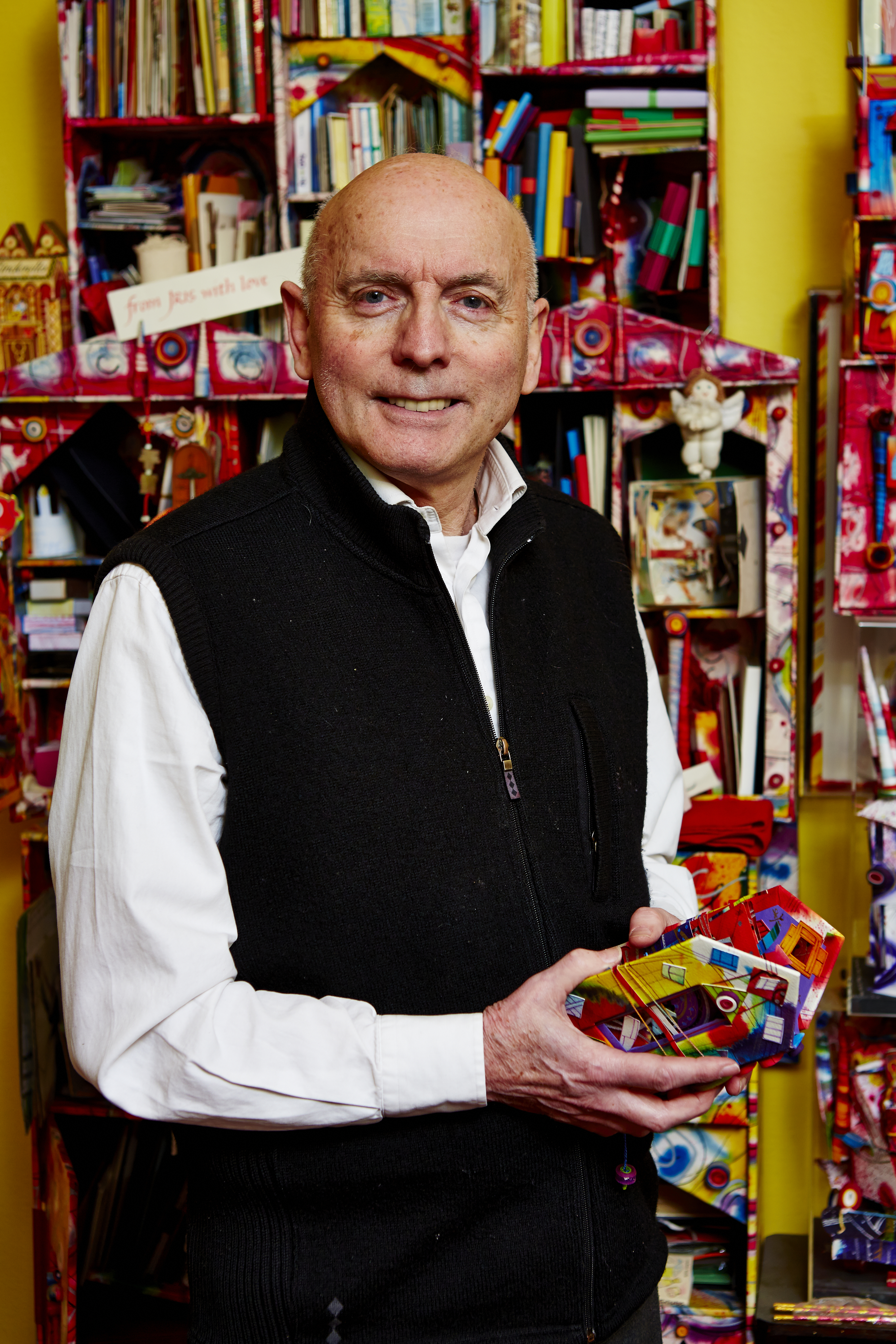
- Born: March 14, 1943 (age 82)
- Occupations: Paper engineer, book artist, teacher
- Website: bookart.co.uk

Paul Johnson is a book artist and teacher in the United Kingdom. He is best known as a pop-up and movable book artist and for his work as a teacher of book art and children’s literacy. He is the founder of the Book Art Project, an initiative that teaches writing to children through bookmaking, and has made books with over 200,000 children and over 25,000 teachers worldwide.

== Education ==
Paul Johnson grew up in Norwich, England. He attended the Norwich University of the Arts and the Visva-Bharati University in Santiniketan, India, before getting his PhD from the University of York.

== Career as an educator ==
In 1987, while an art educator at the Manchester Metropolitan University, Johnson launched the Book Art Project, designed to advance writing and communication skills through courses, publications and workshops for teachers and children. He has made books with over 200,000 children and over 25,000 teachers worldwide.

== Bookmaking career ==
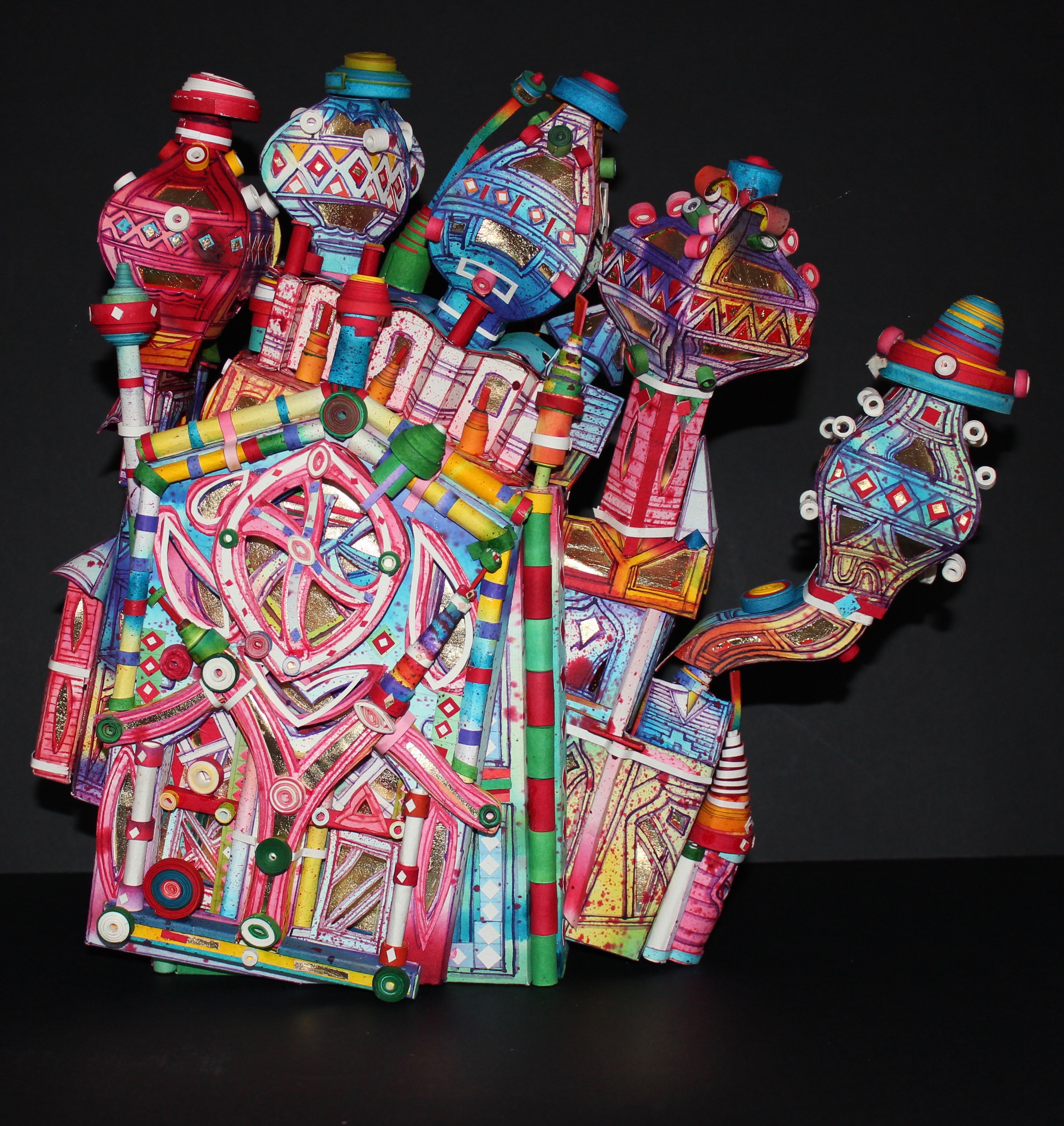
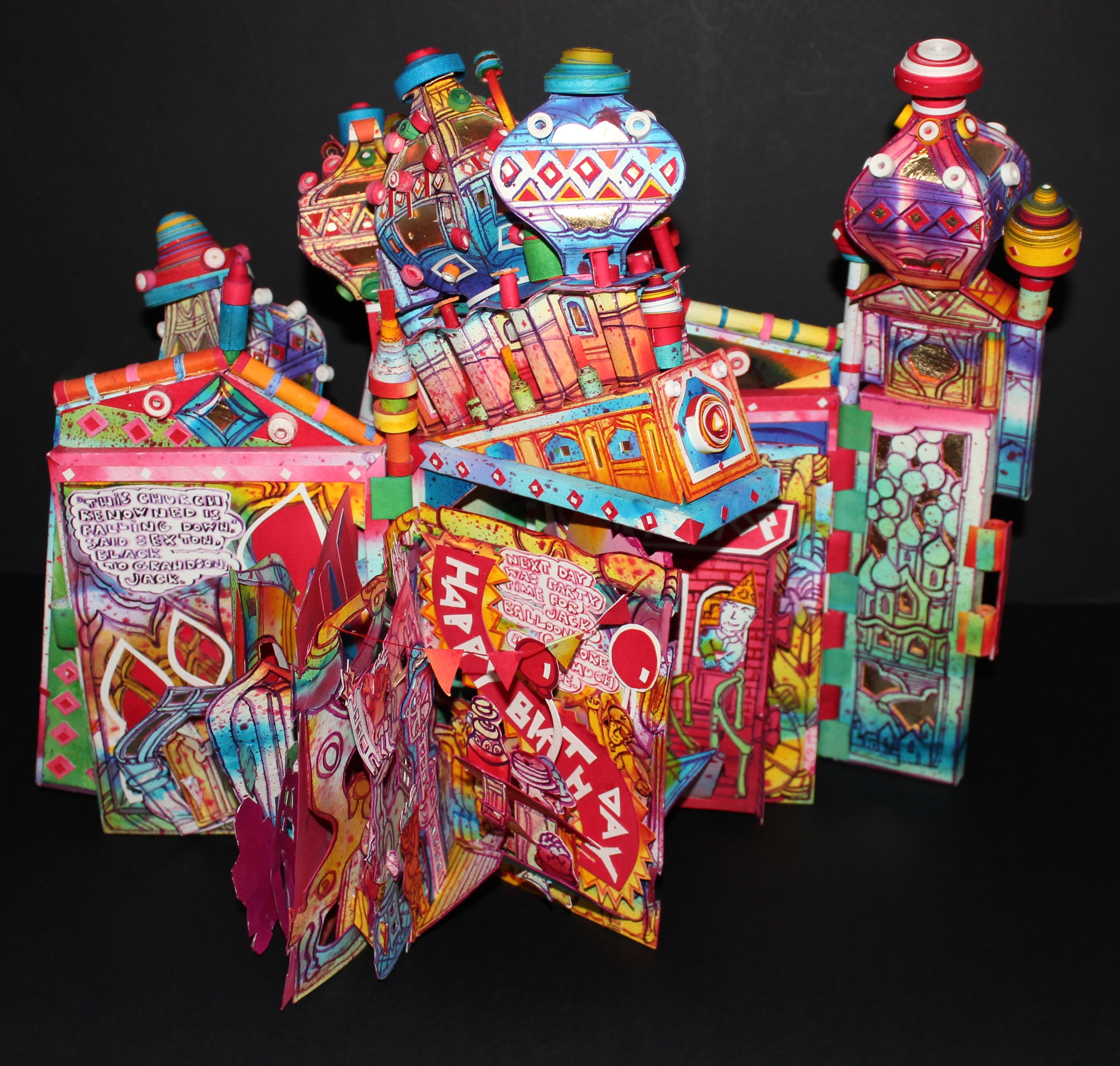
The Flying Cathedral (left): cover; (right): inside

After experimenting with poetry and performance art, Johnson began to make his own books in his early 40s.

Early in his artistic career, Johnson was inspired to consider a book as more than something to read after seeing the sculptural book bindings of Phillip Smith, MBE. Johnson's own style embraces a profusion of bright-colored fabric dyes onto watercolor paper, many times on both the front and back of the paper. Johnson's book art creations are unique in that he does not use glue in his books. He constructs the pop-up mechanisms using dovetail, joints and paper hinges. A single book structure could include up to 200 individual pieces.

In 2018, Johns Hopkins University acquired the Paul Johnson Archive comprising over 500 items of his artwork (including 250 pop-ups) dating from approximately 1965-2015.

Johnson was awarded the 2021 Meggendorfer Prize for Best Artist Book from the Movable Book Society for The Lemon Tree. The prize recognizes outstanding three-dimensional books not commercially published or mass produced.

== Publications ==
Johnson is the author of almost 20 publications about bookmaking, including Pop-up Paper Engineering (1992), a guide to the moveable book form. Books by Johnson include:

- A Book of One's Own: Developing Literacy Through Making Books (1991; ISBN 978-0-435-08708-1)
- Books Searching for Authors (1994; ISBN 978-0-340-58910-6)
- Get Writing! Ages 4 - 7: Creative Book-Making Projects for Children (2005; ISBN 978-0-7136-7312-8)
- Get Writing! Ages 7-12: Creative Book-Making Projects for Children (2008; ISBN 978-0-7136-8775-0)
- Literacy Through the Book Arts (1993; ISBN 978-0-435-08766-1)
- Making Books: Over 30 Practical Book-Making Projects for Children (2000; ISBN 978-0-7136-5077-8)
- Making Your Own Book (1994; ISBN 978-0-582-12308-3)
- New Pop-Up Paper Projects: Step-by-step paper engineering for all ages (2013; ISBN 978-0-415-67931-2)
- Pictures & Words Together: Children Illustrating and Writing Their Own Books (1997; ISBN 978-0-435-08883-5)
- Pop-up Paper Engineering: Cross-curricular Activities in Design Engineering Technology, English and Art (1992; ISBN 978-1-85000-909-2)

== Sources ==
- Johnson, Paul (2019). Four Jam Sandwiches: A Workingman's Life Told Through His Sketchbook Drawings. Independently published. ISBN 978-1-0738-2368-0.
