= Waldo Hunt =

American publisher of pop-up books

Waldo Henley Hunt
- Born: November 28, 1920; Chicago, Illinois, US
- Died: November 6, 2009 (aged 88); Porterville, California, US
- Known for: Publisher of pop-up books

Waldo Henley Hunt (November 28, 1920 – November 6, 2009) was a prolific producer of pop-up books, having nearly singlehandedly revived the genre in the post-war era.

== Biography ==
His company, Intervisual Books (also known as Intervisual Communications), created pop-up books of all varieties—from The Human Body to Harry Potter and the Chamber of Secrets. Haunted House by Jan Pieńkowski, a pop-up book created by Hunt, won the 1980 Kate Greenaway Medal for illustration of children's books.

Born in Chicago, Hunt grew up in San Mateo, California. He terminated his college career at Stanford University early to serve in World War II. After his Army stint, Hunt began a career in advertising, starting his own agency.

He exited the advertising business to found a graphic design firm. At the new firm, Graphics International, he developed an interest in pop-up design, initially focused on pop-up advertisements for magazines. Ib Penick was a business partner and paper engineer at Graphics International.

In a 2002 interview with the Los Angeles Times, Hunt said, "I knew I'd found the magic key. No one was doing pop-ups in this country. No one could afford to make them here. They had to be done by hand, and labor was too expensive."

In 1965, Hunt published a book called Bennett Cerf's Pop-Up Riddles, which was sold as a product promotion for $1.00 and two Maxwell House coffee labels. Cerf was the president of Random House at the time, and by 1967, Hunt had 30 pop-up books in production for Random House.

In the late 1960s, Hallmark bought Graphics International, and Hunt next founded Intervisual Books to produce pop-up and movable books. Hunt became known as the "King of the Pop-Ups," and was considered by many to be "the father of the modern pop-up book industry" for his work in pioneering pop-up interactive books. His companies dominated the pop-up book business from the 1960s until the late 1990s. By 1996, Intervisual Books had published 1,000 movable books and pop-up advertisements. Among his books, Hunt's personal favorites included best-sellers, The Human Body by David Pelham, Haunted House by Jan Pieńkowski with paper engineering by Tor Lokvig, and How Many Bugs in a Box? by David A. Carter. In its obituary of Hunt, The New York Times wrote that Hunt was "almost single-handedly responsible" for the revival of the pop-up book in the United States and noted:

"On the flat, foursquare pages of a printed book, Waldo H. Hunt could part the Red Sea. He could make hearts beat, lungs fill and bones rattle. He could make dinosaurs rear up, ships set sail and bats quiver in belfries."

Cynthia Burlingham, director of the UCLA Grunwald Center for the Graphic Arts at the Hammer Museum, said of Hunt, "He was such an important publisher of pop-up books who really advanced them technically. The pop-up designers who worked for him were amazing creative engineers."

In addition to producing pop-up works, he was a significant collector of pop-up and other movable books, amassing 4,000 antique and contemporary titles. Hunt's extensive collection was the basis for a 2002 exhibit, Pop Up! 500 Years of Movable Books, at the Los Angeles Central Library.

Hunt lived for 30 years in Encino, Los Angeles, California. He retired in 2002 and moved to Springville, California. He died from congestive heart failure at age 88.

== Awards ==
In 2000, the Movable Book Society honored Hunt with the MBS Lifetime Achievement Award.
