= Danny Fingeroth =

American comic book writer and editor

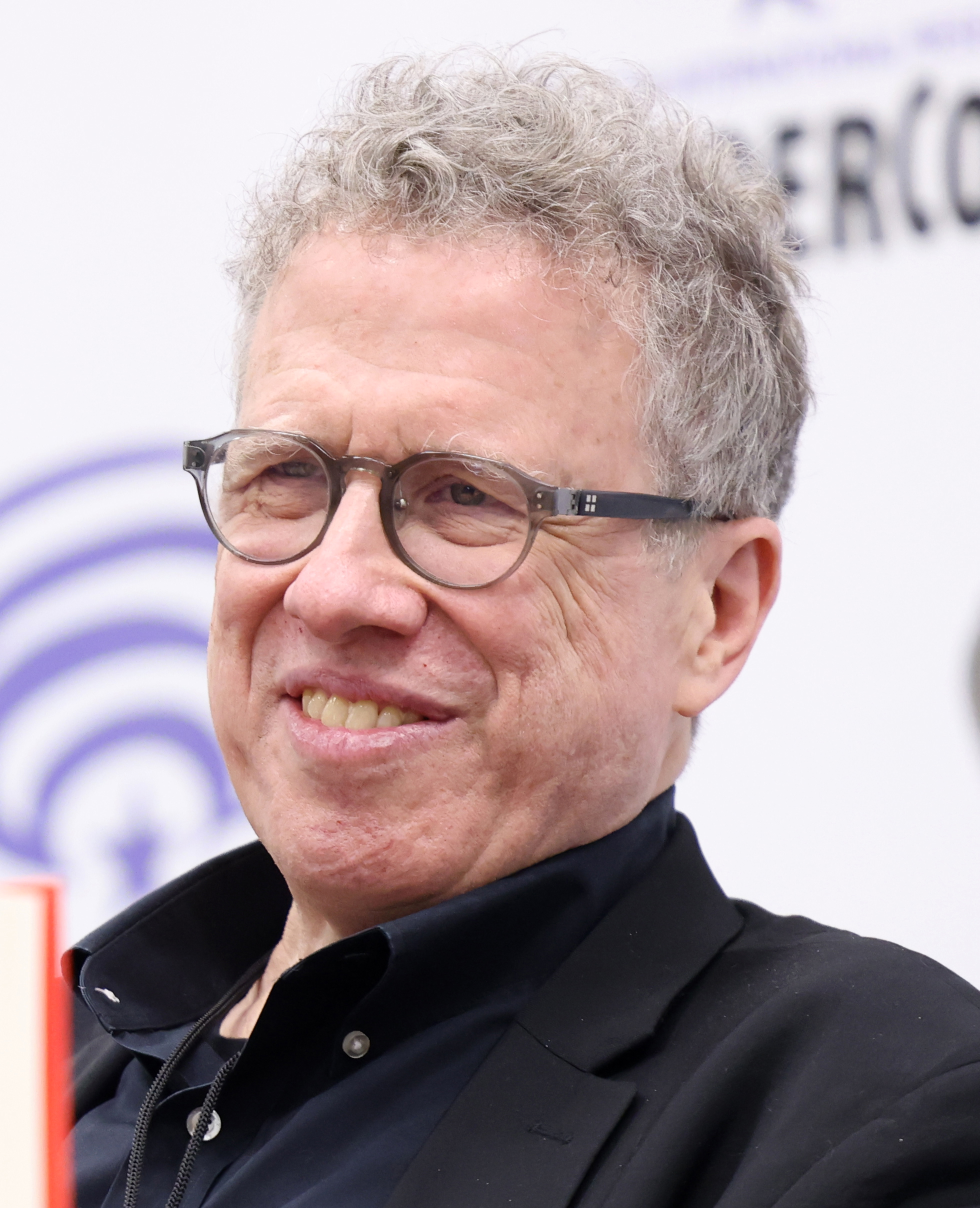
- Fingeroth in 2025
- Born: September 17 New York City, U.S.
- Areas: Writer, editor
- Notable works: Darkhawk; Various Spider-Man titles

Daniel Fingeroth (/ˈfɪŋɡərɒθ/; born September 17) is an American comic book writer and editor, best known for a long stint as group editor of the Spider-Man books at Marvel Comics.

== Early life ==
Fingeroth was born in New York City.

== Career ==
=== As a writer and editor ===
Fingeroth got his start in the comics business in 1976 as an assistant to Larry Lieber at Marvel Comics. At Marvel Comics in the 1980s, he edited the Spider-Man titles as well as Marvel Team-Up and Ka-Zar. Fingeroth was the group editor of the Spider-Man titles from 1991 to 1995, including the first part of the clone saga.

As a writer, Fingeroth worked on Darkhawk, writing all 50 issues of the book between 1991 and 1995. Before that, he had a long stint on Dazzler, wrote the Deadly Foes of Spider-Man and Lethal Foes of Spider-Man mini-series, the Howard the Duck movie adaptation comic and various issues of several Marvel titles, including Avengers, Daredevil, Iron Man and What If?, as well as the Deathtrap: The Vault graphic novel.

Fingeroth resigned from Marvel in 1995 to become editor-in-chief of Virtual Comics for Byron Preiss Multimedia and AOL. From there, Fingeroth served as senior vice president for creative development at Visionary Media, home of Showtime's WhirlGirl, for which he served as story editor.

He edited Write Now! (TwoMorrows Publishing), a magazine about the craft of comics writing that he created, which ran for 20 issues from 2003 to 2009. He wrote the 2004 Continuum Publishing book Superman on the Couch: What Superheroes Really Tell Us About Ourselves and Our Society. Fingeroth also wrote The Rough Guide to Graphic Novels (featuring artwork by Mike Manley).

=== As an educator and public speaker ===
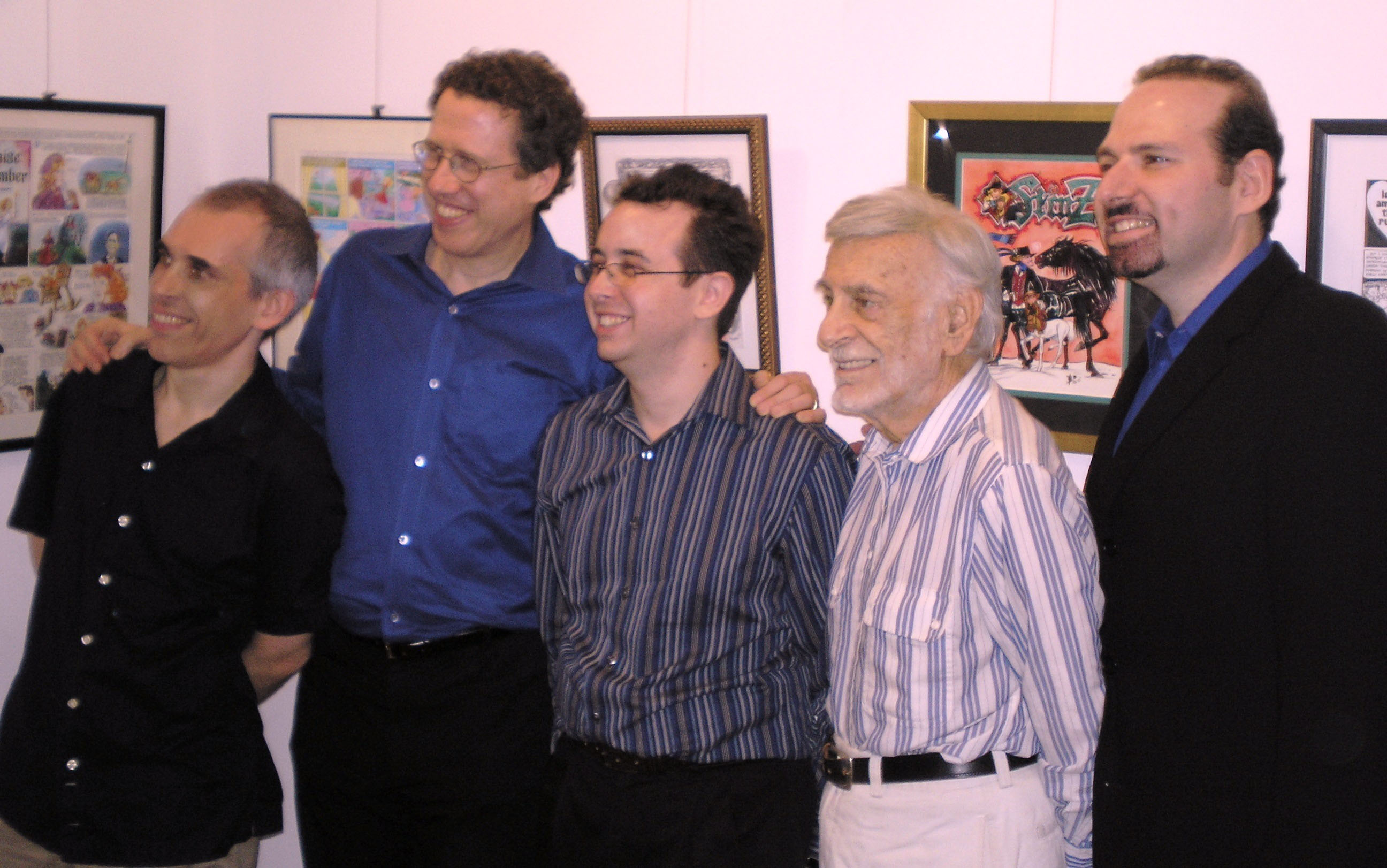
Robert Sikoryak, Danny Fingeroth, Arie Kaplan, Jerry Robinson and Eddy Friedfeld at a Museum of Comic and Cartoon Art event, August 2006.

Fingeroth has taught comics writing at New York University, The New School, Media Bistro and Soho Gallery for Digital Art.

He has been a speaker at the New York Comics & Picture-Story Symposium at Parsons The New School for Design. He has also taught classes, and functioned as organizer, moderator and curator of events at the Museum of Comic and Cartoon Art.

In 2012, Fingeroth along with Karen Green, Graphic Novels Librarian (Columbia University) and Jeremy Dauber, Director, Institute for Israel and Jewish Studies (Columbia University) organized Comic New York, a symposium marking writer Chris Claremont's donation of his archives of all his major writing projects over the previous 40 years to the university's Rare Book & Manuscript Library. The symposium, which was held March 24–25, 2012 at Columbia's Low Memorial Library, featured discussion panels with Fingeroth, Claremont, and numerous other mainstream and independent comics creators.

== Selected works ==
=== Comics ===
- Avengers: #207-208, 304
- Avengers Spotlight #35
- Daredevil: #235
- Darkhawk: #1-50; Annual #1-2
- Darkhawk: Heart of the Hawk
- Dazzler: #8–24, 26
- Deadly Foes of Spider-Man: #1-4
- Fantastic Four: #355
- Iron Man: #210, 212–214, 253
- The Spectacular Spider-Man: #125-126
- Spider-Man: Friends and Enemies #1-4
- Superman 80-Page Giant #1 (Feb. 1999) (writer for ten-page short story)
- Web of Spider-Man: #4-6, 10–11, 71-72 Annual #3
- Venom: Deathtrap: The Vault

=== Books ===
- Superman on the Couch: What Superheroes Really Tell Us about Ourselves and Society; foreword by Stan Lee (Continuum International Publishing Group, 2004) ISBN 0-8264-1540-7
- The Rough Guide to Graphic Novels (Rough Guides, 2008) ISBN 978-1-84353-993-3
- Disguised as Clark Kent: Jews, Comics, and the Creation of the Superhero; foreword by Stan Lee (Continuum International Publishing Group, 2007) ISBN 978-0-8264-1767-1
- The Stan Lee Universe; co-editor (with Roy Thomas) (TwoMorrows Publishing, 2011) ISBN 1-60549-030-X (hardcover), 1-60549-029-6 (softcover)
- A Marvelous Life: The Amazing Story of Stan Lee (St. Martin's Press, 2019) ISBN 978-1-250-13390-8
- Jack Ruby: The Many Faces of Oswald's Assassin (Chicago Review Press, 2023) ISBN 978-1641609128

Preceded by David Michelinie	Avengers writer 1981 (with Bob Budiansky)	Succeeded by Jim Shooter
Preceded by Tom DeFalco	Dazzler writer 1981–1983	Succeeded by Frank Springer
Preceded by Dennis O'Neil	Iron Man writer 1986–1987	Succeeded by Bob Layton & David Michelinie
