= Museum of Comic and Cartoon Art =

Arts organization and museum in New York City

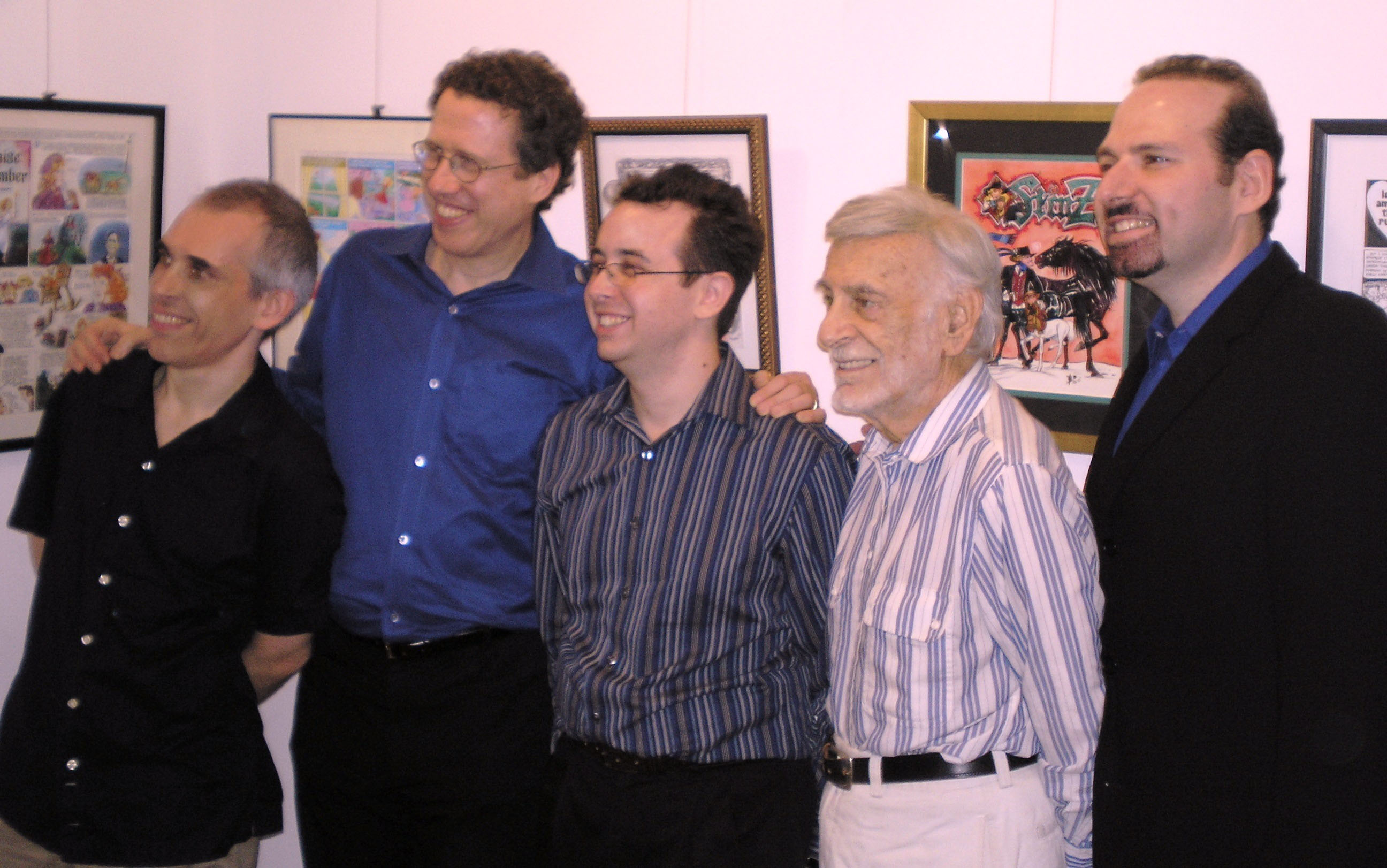
- Comics professionals Robert Sikoryak, Danny Fingeroth, Arie Kaplan, Jerry Robinson and Eddy Friedfeld at the Museum of Comic and Cartoon Art in 2006
- Established: October 2001
- Dissolved: July 9, 2012
- Location: 594 Broadway, New York City
- Coordinates: 40.74°N 73.99°W
- Type: exhibition of narrative art, cartoons, comic books and graphic novels
- Director: Ellen S. Abramowitz (chairman)
- President: Lawrence Klein (founder)

The Museum of Comic and Cartoon Art (MoCCA) is a not-for-profit arts organization and former museum in New York City devoted to comic books, comic strips and other forms of cartoon art. MoCCA sponsored events ranging from book openings to educational programs in New York City schools, and hosted classes, workshops and lectures. MoCCA was perhaps best known for its annual small-press comic convention, known as MoCCA Fest, first held in 2002.

== History ==
MoCCA was founded by Lawrence Klein in October 2001. It was located at 594 Broadway in New York City.

On July 9, 2012, MoCCA announced that it would be closing its physical location, effective immediately, due to fundraising difficulties.

On August 2, 2012, MoCCA announced plans to transfer their assets to the Society of Illustrators, providing MoCCA with a street-level location in the Society's Upper East Side building. It was confirmed that MoCCA Fest would continue to exist.

== MoCCA Festival ==
The MoCCA Festival (or MoCCA Fest) is an annual fundraiser for the museum (and now for the Society of Illustrators). It is New York's largest independent comics showcase, featuring hundreds of creators and publishers on the main floor, typically accompanied with additional rooms devoted to educational panel discussions, slide shows, and interviews. From its inception in 2002 until 2008 it was held at the Puck Building. From 2009 to 2014, it took place at the 69th Regiment Armory. In 2015, the event was split between two locations, with the exhibitors in Center548, and the programming at the High Line Hotel. Plans to convert Center548 to a residential property forced the Society to find new venue. From 2016 through at least 2019, Metropolitan West has hosted the exhibitors with programming taking take place at Ink48.

From 2002 to 2012, the museum presented an award at MoCCA Fest to an artist whose outstanding work elevated the comic art form. Originally known as the MoCCA Art Festival Award, it was renamed the Klein Award in 2009 in honor of MoCCA Founder Lawrence Klein. MoCCA Fest hosted the comics industry's 2004 and 2005 Harvey Awards.

== Exhibits ==
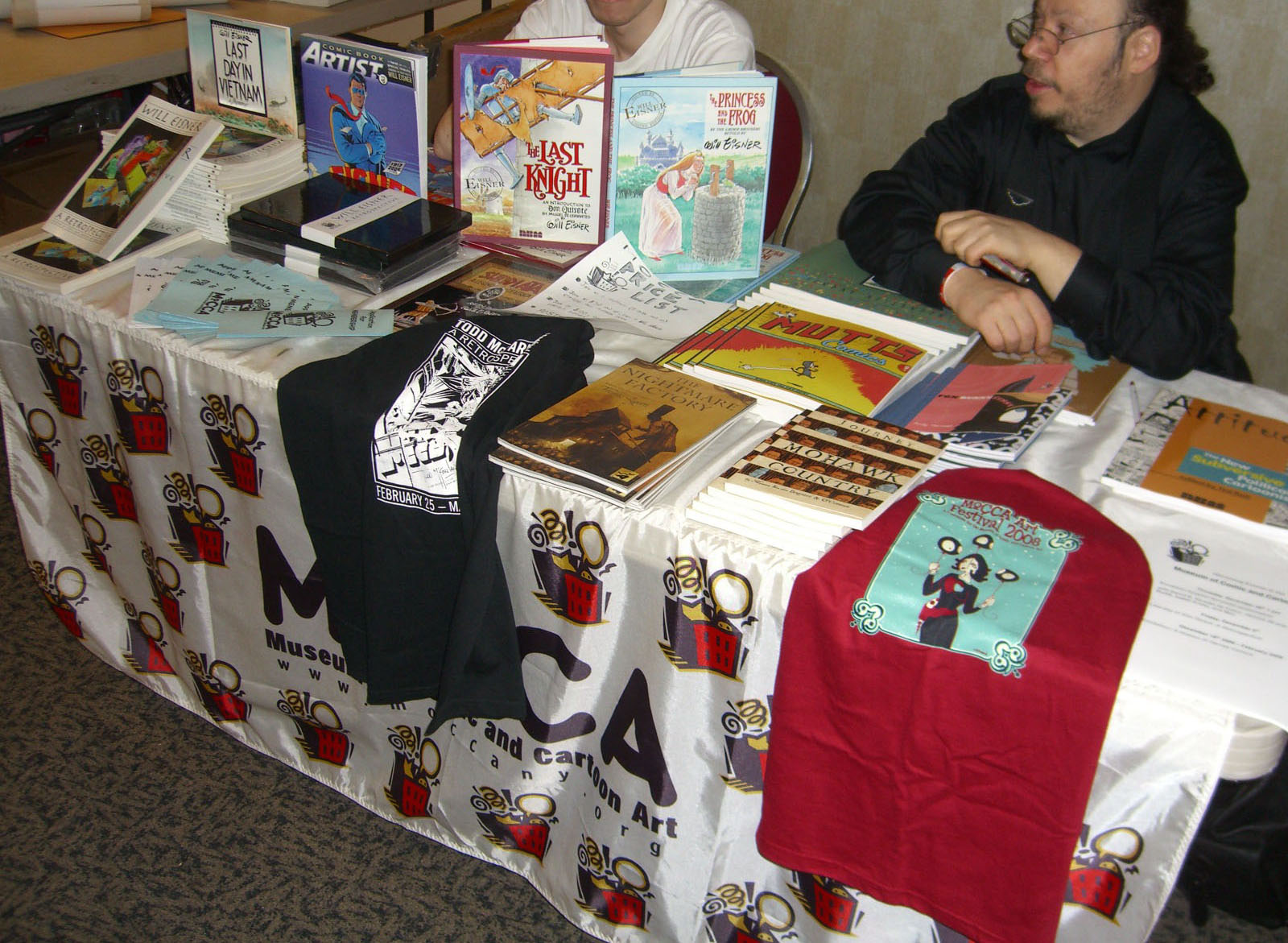
The MoCCA table at the Big Apple Con, November 14, 2008

In 2003, MoCCA opened its art gallery with the debut exhibit "Gag Art!", focusing on single-panel magazine cartoons. Subsequent exhibits included the relationship between New York City and cartoonists, an exhibition of women comic-book artists, retrospectives devoted to Stan Lee and Will Eisner, and "From Richie Rich to Wendy the Good Little Witch: The Art of Harvey Comics". Their The Art of Archie Comics exhibit was promoted with a story in Archie Digest Magazine #260, March 2010. The seven-page story, MoCCA Madness, was written by Arie Kaplan and drawn by Fernando Ruiz. It featured appearances by MoCCA President Ellen Abramowitz and then-Director Karl Erickson, and was subsequently reprinted in Archie: A Celebration of America's Favorite Teenagers by Craig Yoe (IDW, 2011).

== See also ==
- Belgian Comic Strip Center (Brussels, Belgium)
- Billy Ireland Cartoon Library & Museum (Columbus, Ohio)
- Cartoon Art Museum (San Francisco, California)
- The Cartoon Museum (London, England)
- National Cartoon Museum (Formerly of Greenwich, Connecticut and Boca Raton, Florida)
- ToonSeum (Pittsburgh, Pennsylvania)
