= Louis Loeb =

American illustrator and painter

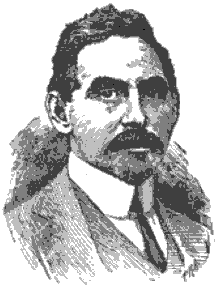
- Born: November 7, 1866; Cuyahoga County, Ohio
- Died: July 12, 1909 (aged 42); Canterbury, New Hampshire
- Occupation: Artist

Louis Loeb (November 7, 1866 — July 12, 1909) was an American illustrator. In his time, he was one of the best known in his field. He was also a draftsman, a painter, and a lithographer.

== Biography ==
Born in Cuyahoga County, Ohio, to Alexander Loeb, a dry goods merchant, Louis worked at a Cleveland lithography firm from age 14, later taking evening classes in sketching at the Cleveland Art Club. In 1885, he worked at a lithography firm in New York City, with his evenings spent at the Art Students League.

In 1889 he went to Paris to study, under Lefebvre, Constant, and Gérôme, giving up lithography. After three years, he returned to New York where in 1893 he started work for The Century Magazine as an illustrator. For the next few years up until 1900, he traveled to and from Europe, both for study and in the course of his work for The Century. During the remainder of his life, he stayed in the U.S., dying in Canterbury, New Hampshire.

== Works ==
He won an honorable mention at the Paris Salon in 1895, and a third medal in 1897. In 1903 his exhibition of oils at the new rooms of the Cooperative Society in New York aroused interest in his later work. He was awarded two silver medals at the Saint Louis Exposition 1904. His best-known works are:

- Temple of the Winds (1898), in the Metropolitan Museum, New York
- The Breeze (1900)
- The Dawn (1903)
- The Siren (1905)
- Eleanor Robson, a portrait (1905)
- Miranda (1906), in the Metropolitan Museum, New York
- The Summit (1907)
- Princess Zomona (1908)
