= Sally Blakemore =

American paper engineer (born 1947)

- Born: Sally Blakemore; April 15, 1947 (age 79); Odessa, Texas
- Education: North Texas State University, University of Texas, Austin
- Occupations: Book artist, paper engineer, artist
- Website: artyprojects.com

Sally Blakemore is a paper engineer and pop-up book packager based in Santa Fe, New Mexico. She is best known for NASCAR Pop-up: A Guide to the Sport, which includes two dozen pop-ups and a 12-second sound chip. Blakemore also heads Arty Projects Studio, a pop-up and novelty book packaging company.

== Biography ==
Blakemore has a bachelor’s of art degree in painting and sculpture. She also exhibited with the International Society of Copier Artists.

Blakemore is a self-taught paper engineer. "I bought my first pop-up book in 1979, at the age of thirty-three. Tor Lokvig's paper engineering in Haunted House by Jan Pieńkowski totally intrigued me and made me laugh with glee. I studied each mechanic, took it apart, and put it back together again. It was my education in the making."

As a child, Blakemore, who had dyslexia and synesthesia, could not read at all. According to one interview, she said "I liked to look at the comics and the weather map in the newspaper. It was very humiliating. I could not make the leap from a printed word to the meaning of the word....I could not spell at all and phonetics didn't really make sense....It is so strange that I somehow got into publishing!"

For nearly two years in the 1990s, Blakemore worked as art director for paper engineer' James Diaz's White Heat Ltd. company, where she learn the basics of pop-up and novelty book production.

As head of Arty Projects Studio, Blakemore once spent a month in Malaysia overseeing the commercial production of the pop-up book Ancient Dwellings. The first print run was 10,000 books and involved 400 women in hand-assembling the book. One of the company's most successful novelty book is Peek-A-Moo!, a lift the flap book by Marie Torres Cimarusti, with over 390,000 copies in print.

In 2010, Blakemore was the keynote speaker at the Movable Book Society Conference in Portland, Oregon.

== Selected bibliography ==
Pop-up books paper engineered by Sally Blakemore:

- Blakemore, Sally (2004), Ancient Dwellings of the Southwest, Western National Park Association, OCLC 55753594
- Blakemore, Sally (1998), Circus!: A Pop-up Adventure, Little Simon, OCLC 39980741
- Blakemore, Sally (one of 28 paper engineers) (2010), Handmade Paper in Motion, Portfolio 9, Pop-ups, Hand Papermaking, OCLC 692218926
- Blakemore, Sally (2009), NASCAR Pop-up: A Guide to the Sport, Gibbs Smith, OCLC 259258649
- Blakemore, Sally (1997), Pooh's Christmas Box, Disney Press, OCLC 38088764
- Blakemore, Sally (2005), Pop-Up Aesop, Getty Publications, OCLC 61478174

Pop-up artists' books by Sally Blakemore:

- Blakemore, Sally, Gurls (Investigating the sublimation of women worldwide)
- Blakemore, Sally (2001), July 16, 1945: New Mexico's History of the Atomic Bomb

Books illustrated by Sally Blakemore:

- Blakemore, Sally (2015), Algebra survival guide: A conversational handbook for the thoroughly befuddled, Singing Turtle Press, OCLC 877851011
- Blakemore, Sally (1996), Bats: Extremely Weird series, John Muir Publications, OCLC 33819625
- Blakemore, Sally (1991), Frogs: Extremely Weird series, John Muir Publications, OCLC 33862847
- Blakemore, Sally (1996), Spiders: Extremely Weird series, John Muir Publications, OCLC 716690645
- Blakemore, Sally (1991), Reptiles: Extremely Weird series, John Muir Publications, OCLC 607201998

== External sources ==
- Official Sally Blakemore Website http://www.artyprojects.com/
- How to Make a Pop-up Book (2016 educational video) narrated by Blakemore. https://www.youtube.com/watch?v=bHsmfGhBhQM
- Paper Play (2016 video) narrated by Blakemore. https://www.youtube.com/watch?v=Ju_1Xl5igsk
