= Ib Penick =

- Born: May 11, 1930; Odense, Denmark
- Died: April 21, 1998 (aged 67); Wilmington, North Carolina, U.S.
- Occupation(s): Paper Engineer, Inventor
- Children: 3

Ib Penick (1930–1998), a native of Denmark, was known as "the creative mind behind the resurgence of pop-up children's books in the 1960s and 1970s. In his career, Penick designed more than 130 children's books, including Star Wars: a Pop-up Book, which sold more than a million copies. Penick related to one reporter, "...there are only about 100 folds and tricks to [his paper engineering] trade. It's like playing a piano. You have only a certain number of keys, but it's the combinations that make the difference."

== Biography ==
In the 1960s Penick joined Waldo Hunt at Graphics International, a firm that created pop-up books, including a series of titles for Random House and other publishers. Penick was the "premier paper engineer" for the Random House pop-up titles, with Tor Lokvig as his protege. According to Gerald Harrison, a former president of the children's books division at Random House, Penick "was really responsible for creating the whole world we lived in. With the advent of the Random House line, a whole industry was created and the very first ones were created by Ib."

Penick and Hunt later sold Graphics International to Hallmark Cards in 1966.

== Selected bibliography ==
The following is a sample of the pop-up books paper engineered by Ib Penick:

- Penick, Ib; Barlowe, Wayne (1978), Star Wars: A Pop-up Book, Random House, OCLC 16436266
- Penick, Ib; Forte, Joseph (1986), The Story of the Statue of Liberty: with movable illustrations in three dimensions, Holt, Rinehart and Winston, OCLC 13663592
- Penick, Ib; Swan, Curt; Oksner, Bob; Serpe, Jerry (1979), Superman: a pop-up book, Random House, OCLC 6014334
- Penick, Ib; Sondern, Ferd (1974), Who are the people in your neighborhood?, Random House and Children's Television Workshop, OCLC 2294774

== Patents ==
Penick held several patents in the area of paper engineering, camera design and packaging, including:

1. A U.S. patent 4784314 A– Decorative paperboard boxes
2. A U.S. patent 4313270 A– Item with pivoting pop-up
3. A U.S. patent 4337589 A– Method of making hinged pop-up items
4. A U.S. patent 4349973 A– Pop-ups and methods of making
5. A U.S. patent 4146983 A– Promotional pop-up and method of making
6. A U.S. patent 5022681 A– Paper pop-up devices and method of making the same
7. A U.S. patent 4192596 A– Camera with improved shutter arrangement
8. A U.S. patent 3650194 A– Disposable Camera
9. A U.S. patent 4057813 A– Pocket sized camera
