= Chuck Fischer =

American painter

Chuck Fischer is an American muralist, designer, and author of pop-up books. He was featured in an exhibit in the National Museum of American History entitled Paper Engineering: Fold, Pull, Pop & Turn along with paper engineer Bruce Foster. His fabric and wallpaper designs are part of the permanent collection at the Cooper–Hewitt, National Design Museum.

== Bibliography ==
- A Christmas Carol: A Pop-Up Book (Little, Brown, 2010)
- Angels: A Pop-Up Book (Little, Brown, 2009)
- In the Beginning: A Pop-Up Book (Little, Brown, 2008)
- Christmas Around the World: A Pop-Up Book (Little, Brown, 2007)
- Christmas in New York: A Pop-Up Book (Little, Brown, 2005)
- The White House: A Pop-Up Book (Rizzoli, 2004)
- Wallcoverings: Applying the Language of Color and Pattern (Rizzoli, 2003)
- Great American Houses and Gardens (Rizzoli, 2002)
