= David A. Carter =

American author and illustrator

- Born: March 4, 1957 (age 69); Salt Lake City, Utah, U.S.
- Occupations: Author and Illustrator
- Spouse: Noelle Carter
- Children: Molly and Emma
- Writing career
- Language: English
- Genre: Pop-up books
- Notable work: Bugs series Colors series
- Website: www.popupbooks.com

David A. Carter (born March 4, 1957) is an American author and illustrator. He is best known for his pop-up books for both children and adults. His Bugs series has sold over 6 million copies.

== Career ==
During the late 1970s, Carter worked as a graphic designer and advertising illustrator. Until 1987 he worked as an artist, a paper engineer and a book designer for a publishing house. After this he moved into his current career as an author, illustrator, and paper engineer, primarily of children's books. His first book was How Many Bugs in a Box?. Carter often works with his wife, Noelle Carter. Carter has created more than 90 books, including a guide on how to make pop-ups titled, The Elements of Pop Up. He designed a hardback book of graffiti design for the British band Coldplay's 2011 album Mylo Xyloto.

Carter and paper engineer James Diaz were awarded the 2023 Meggendorfer Prize for Best Paper Engineering at the 15th annual Movable Book Society Conference in Cleveland, Ohio.

== Personal life ==
Carter was born on 4 March 1957, at the L.D.S. Hospital in Salt Lake City, Utah. He attended Utah State University. His hobbies include gardening, tennis, skiing and travelling. He lives with his wife, Noelle L. Carter in Auburn, California. They have two daughters, Molly and Emma.

== Works ==
=== Written and illustrated ===
- What's in My Pocket?, Putnam (New York, NY), 1989.
- Surprise Party, Grosset & Dunlap (New York, NY), 1990.
- Snack Attack: A Tasty Pop-Up Book, Simon & Schuster (New York, NY), 1990. (with Lynette Ruschak)
- Playful Pandas, National Geographic Society (Washington, DC), 1991.
- In a Dark, Dark Wood, Simon & Schuster (New York, NY), 1991, published as In a Dark, Dark Wood: An Old Tale with a New Twist, Simon & Schuster (New York, NY), 2002.
- Opposites, Simon & Schuster (New York, NY), 1993.
- Colors, Simon & Schuster (New York, NY), 1993.
- Counting, Simon & Schuster (New York, NY), 1993.
- I'm Shy, Simon & Schuster (New York, NY), 1993.
- In and Out, Simon & Schuster (New York, NY), 1993. (with Roger Smith)
- Says Who?, Simon & Schuster (New York, NY), 1993.
- The Elements of Pop-Up: A Pop-Up Book for Aspiring Paper Engineers, Simon & Schuster (New York, NY), 1999. (with James Diaz)
- Flapdoodle Dinosaurs: A Colorful Pop-Up Book, Simon & Schuster (New York, NY), 2001.
- Who Took the Cookie from the Cookie Jar?: Fun Flaps and Pop-Up Surprises, Scholastic (New York, NY), 2002.
- Glitter Critters: David Carter's Pop-Up Book, Piggy Toes Press (Los Angeles, CA), 2003.
- Let's Make It Pop-Up, Simon & Schuster (New York, NY), 2004. (with James Diaz)
- One Red Dot, Simon & Schuster (New York, NY), 2005.
- Woof! Woof!, Simon & Schuster (New York, NY), 2006.
- Blue 2, Simon & Schuster (New York, NY), 2006.

=== Bugs series ===
- How Many Bugs in a Box?, Simon & Schuster (New York, NY), 1988.
- More Bugs in Boxes, Simon & Schuster (New York, NY), 1990.
- Jingle Bugs, Simon & Schuster (New York, NY), 1992.
- Alpha Bugs, Simon & Schuster (New York, NY), 1994.
- Love Bugs, Simon & Schuster (New York, NY), 1995.
- Feely Bugs, Simon & Schuster (New York, NY), 1995, published in a reduced size edition, 2005.
- Bugs That Go Bump in the Night, Simon & Schuster (New York, NY), 1996.
- Bugs in Space, Simon & Schuster (New York, NY), 1997.
- Finger Bugs Love Bug, Simon & Schuster (New York, NY), 1997.
- Bugs at Play, Simon & Schuster (New York, NY), 1997.
- Bugs at Work, Simon & Schuster (New York, NY), 1997.
- Busy Bugs, Lazy Bugs, Simon & Schuster (New York, NY), 1997.
- Bugs on the Go, Simon & Schuster (New York, NY), 1997.
- Stinky Bugs, Simon & Schuster (New York, NY), 1998.
- Bed Bugs: A Pop-Up Bedtime Book, Simon & Schuster (New York, NY), 1998.
- The Twelve Bugs of Christmas: A Pop-Up Christmas Counting Book, Simon & Schuster (New York, NY), 1999.
- Giggle Bugs: A Lift-and-Laugh Book, Simon & Schuster (New York, NY), 1999.
- Easter Bugs: A Springtime Pop-Up, Simon & Schuster (New York, NY), 2001.
- Chanukah Bugs: A Pop-Up Celebration, Simon & Schuster (New York, NY), 2002.
- Peekaboo Bugs: A Hide-and-Seek Book, Simon & Schuster (New York, NY), 2002.
- Halloween Bugs: A Trick-or-Treat Pop-Up, Simon & Schuster (New York, NY), 2003.
- Beach Bugs, Simon & Schuster (New York, NY), 2008.
- The Big Bug Book, Simon & Schuster (New York, NY), 2008.
- School Bugs, Simon & Schuster (New York, NY), 2009.
- Builder Bugs, Simon & Schuster (New York, NY), 2012.
- Bugs at the Beach, Simon & Schuster (New York, NY), 2016.

=== Collaborations with Noelle Carter ===
- I'm a Little Mouse, Holt (New York, NY), 1990.
- Merry Christmas, Little Mouse: A Scratch-the-Scent and Lift-the-Flap Book, Holt (New York, NY), 1993.
- Peek-a-Boo Little Mouse: A Pat & Play Lift-the-Flap Book, Holt (New York, NY), 1993.
- The Nutcracker: A Pop-Up Adaptation of E.T.A. Hoffman's Original Tale, Simon & Schuster (New York, NY), 2000.
- Little Mouse's Christmas, Piggy Toes Press (Los Angeles, CA), 2003.
