= Matthew Reinhart =

American illustrator and writer

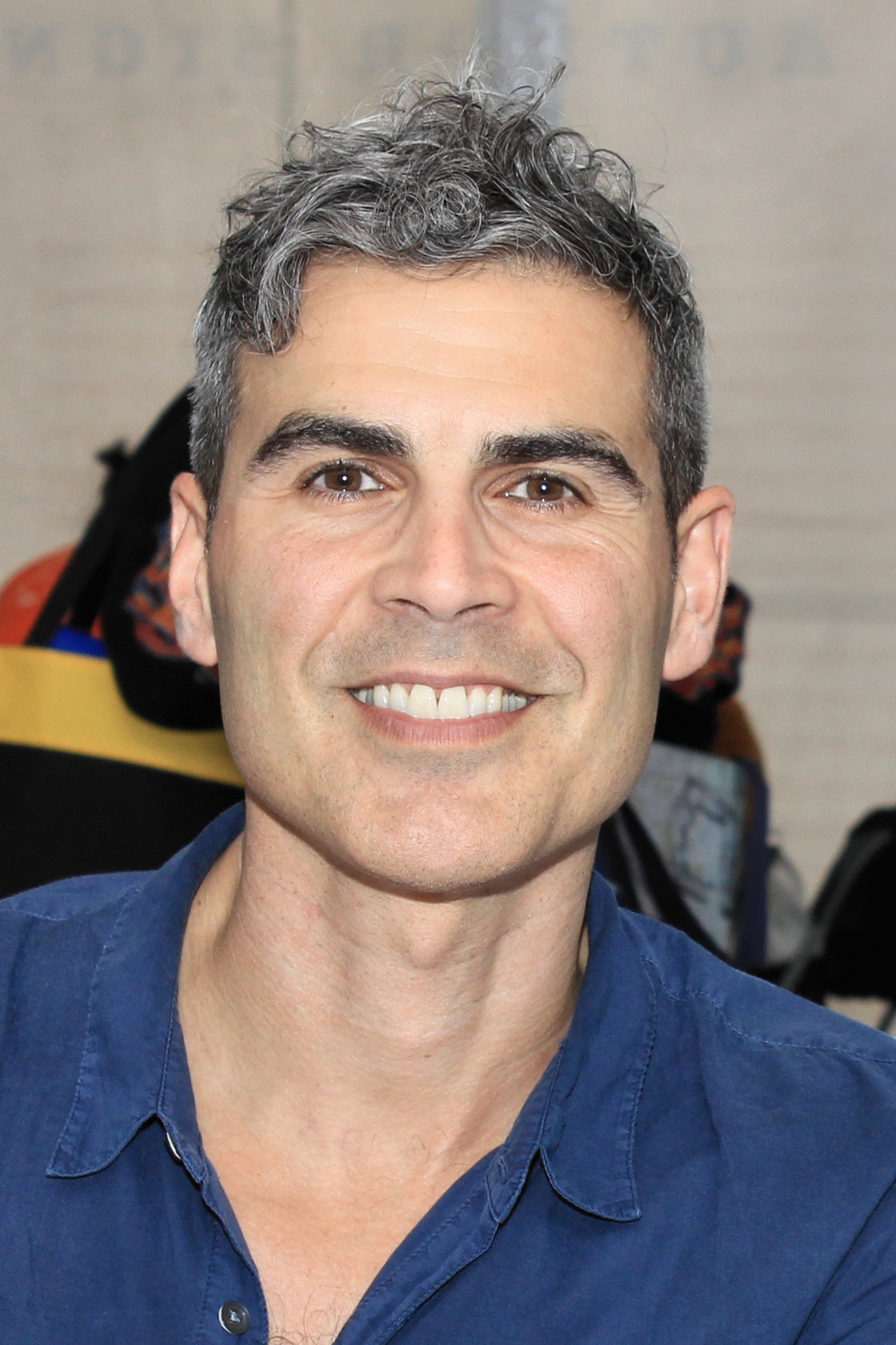
- Reinhart at the 2016 Texas Book Festival
- Born: Matthew Christian Reinhart; September 21, 1971 (age 55); Cedar Rapids, Iowa
- Occupations: Pop-up book and picture book writer/illustrator
- Website: www.matthewreinhart.com

Matthew Christian Reinhart (born September 21, 1971) is an American writer and illustrator of children's pop-up books and picture books. His most recent books include Frozen: a Pop-up Adventure and Lego Pop-up: A Journey through the Lego Universe.

== Early life ==
Reinhart was born to Gary and Judith Reinhart in Cedar Rapids, Iowa. His father joined the United States Navy and the family moved around the country, including Florida, Texas, Illinois, California, Virginia, and South Carolina.

After high school, Reinhart studied biology in preparation for medical school with the assumption that a career in art was too far-fetched. He attended Clemson University in South Carolina taking the required science classes and various art courses to build up his portfolio.

== Career ==
After graduating college, Reinhart moved to New York City for a year before starting medical school. There, he met children’s book author Robert Sabuda doing volunteer work together for a local community center. Sabuda’s book, Christmas Alphabet had just released to rave reviews, and Sabuda convinced Reinhart to follow his true calling. The following year, Reinhart majored in industrial design (with a concentration in toy design) at Pratt Institute in Brooklyn. Although his time at Pratt was a positive experience, his initial dreams of being a toy designer soon transformed into paper engineer.

Reinhart is the co-creator with Sabuda of the New York Times best-selling three-volume pop-up series Encyclopedia Prehistorica. The team’s latest pop-up series is Encyclopedia Mythologica which leads off with Fairies and Magical Creatures (Candlewick, 2008). After working with Saduba on books such as The Wonderful Wizard of Oz, A B C Disney and Movable Mother Goose, Reinhart made his first entry into the pop-up book field with The Pop Up Book Of Phobias. Reinhart has created many award-winning pop-up books, including Cinderella, Star Wars: The Pop-Up Guide to the Galaxy and Mommy? (by Maurice Sendak and Arthur Yorinks).

Other collaborations include Brava Strega Nona! with Tomie dePaola. Reinhart's most recent solo pop-up books include Transformers: The Ultimate Pop-up Universe, Disney Princess: A Magical Pop-Up World, Lego Pop-up: A Journey Through the Lego Universe, and Frozen: A Pop-up Adventure.

== Works ==
- The Pop-up Book of Phobias (1999)
- Young Naturalist's Pop-Up Handbook: Beetles (2001)
- Young Naturalist's Pop-Up Handbook: Butterflies (2001)
- The Pop-up Book of Nightmares (2001)
- Animal Popposites: A Pop-up Book of Opposites (2002)
- Young Naturalist's Handbook: Insect-lo-pedia (2003)
- The Ark (2005)
- Encyclopedia Prehistorica: Dinosaurs (2005)
- Cinderella: A Pop-up Fairy Tale (2005)
- Encyclopedia Prehistorica: Sharks and Other Sea Monsters (2006)
- Castle: Medieval Days and Knights (2006)
- The Jungle Book: A Pop-up Adventure (2006)
- Encyclopedia Prehistorica: Mega-Beasts (2007)
- Star Wars: A Pop-up Guide to the Galaxy (2007)
- Encyclopedia Mythologica: Fairies and Magical Creatures (2008)
- Brava Strega Nona! A Heartwarming Pop-up Book (2008)
- A Pop-up Book of Nursery Rhymes (2009)
- Encyclopedia Mythologica: Gods and Heroes (2010)
- DC Super Heroes: The Ultimate Pop-up Book (2010)
- Encyclopedia Mythologica: Monsters and Dragons (2011)
- Puppies, Kittens, and other Pop-up Pets (2011)
- Star Wars: A Galactic Pop-up Adventure (2012)
- Rescue: Pop-up Emergency Vehicles (2012)
- Rumble! Roar! Dinosaurs! A Prehistoric Pop-up (2012)
- A Princess Like Me: A Royal Pop-up (2012)
- Transformers: The Ultimate Pop-up Universe (2013)
- Game of Thrones: A Pop-up Guide to Westeros (2014)
- Marvel's Avengers: Age of Ultron: A Pop-Up Book (2015)
- My Little Pony: The Castles of Equestria: An Enchanted My Little Pony Pop-Up Book (2015)
- Disney Princess: A Magical Pop-Up World (2015)
- Ever After High: An Enchanted Pop-Up Scrapbook (2016)
- Lego Pop-up: A Journey Through the Lego Universe (2016)
- Frozen: A Pop-up Adventure (2016)

== Personal life ==
Reinhart lives and works in New York City. He married in 2014. He has a sister named Erin.
