= Robert Sabuda =

American illustrator (born 1965)

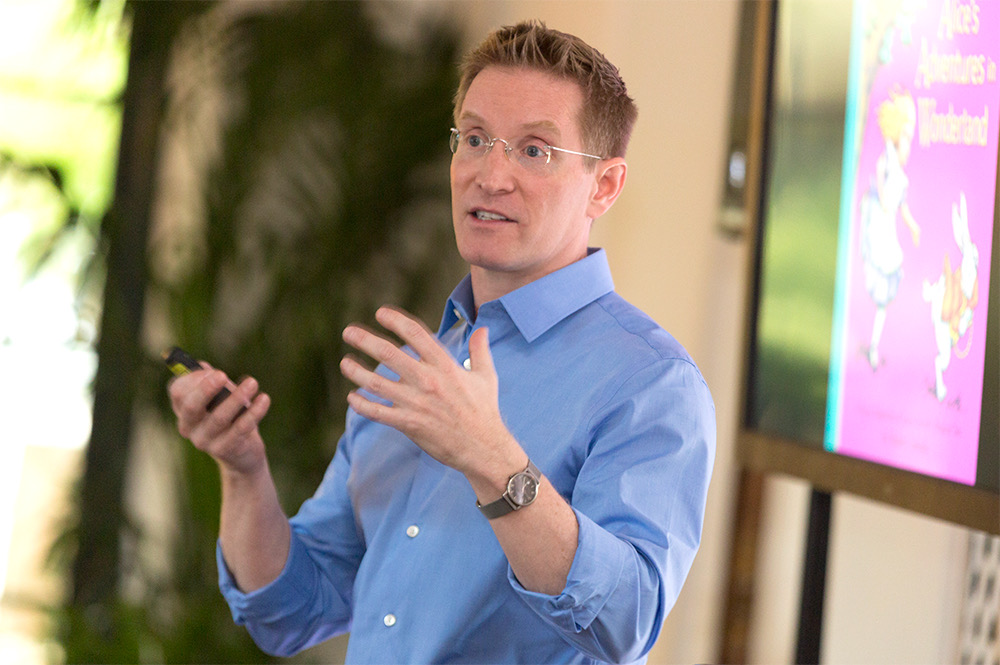
- Robert Sabuda presenting at the Sea Island Creativity Conference in 2015
- Born: Robert James Sabuda; March 8, 1965 (age 61); Wyandotte, Michigan, U.S.

Robert Sabuda (born March 8, 1965) is a children's pop-up book artist and paper engineer. His innovative designs have made him well known in the book arts, with The New York Times referring to Sabuda as "indisputably the king of pop-ups" in a 2003 article.

== Early life ==
Sabuda was raised in Pinckney, Michigan. His father was a mason and a carpenter, providing Sabuda with an appreciation for precise construction. His mother worked as a secretary for the Ford Motor Company and brought home manila folders that Robert would use to create art projects such as pop-up cards and books.

He attended Pratt Institute in New York City, earning a Bachelor of Fine Arts in communications design in 1987.

== Career ==
Sabuda's interest in paper engineering was sparked in childhood by reading a version of Cinderella illustrated by Vojtěch Kubašta. He created his first pop-up book at age eight.

His career in book illustration began with an internship at Dial Books for Young Readers while attending Pratt. Initially working as a package designer, he illustrated his first children's book series, Bulky Board Books, in 1987. He began gaining professional recognition in 1994 when he designed his first pop-up books for children, The Christmas Alphabet.

Within the books he has designed, Sabuda has used techniques including:

- faux stained glass (Arthur and the Sword, 1995)
- batik (Blizzard's Robe, 1999)
- papyrus-textured illustrations (Tutankhamen's Gift, 1994)
- murals (Saint Valentine, 1992)

=== Recognition ===
Sabuda works from his studio in New York City and is involved in a wide variety of projects that involve movable paper. Sabuda has been awarded the Meggendorfer Prize for Best Paper Engineering three times by the Movable Book Society. He is a multiple No. 1 New York Times best-selling children's book creator and has over five million books in print published in over 25 languages.

Book critic Ted Chapin described Sabuda as a "prolific master of the pop-up book" and "something of an artistic and engineering genius" in The New York Times. A 2011 article in The Wall Street Journal said Sabuda is "a master at making books come to life" and referred to him as "the reigning prince of pop-up books." Sabuda's versions of The Wonderful Wizard of Oz (2000) and Alice's Adventures in Wonderland (2003) have been particularly praised, with graphic designer Steven Heller saying of Alice that "the intelligent paper trickery on each spread is, well, awesome."

== Personal life ==
Sabuda married Nasdaq technologist James Talvy on June 25, 2016. They were married at their artist's retreat, 10 Horse Art Center, in Highland, New York. They spend their time in New York City; New Paltz, New York; and Fort Lauderdale, Florida.

== Bibliography ==
=== First editions ===
==== Illustrations ====
1. Garrett, Randal; Heydron, Vicki Ann (1986). The Gandalara Cycle I. Bantam Spectra. ISBN 0-553-25942-3.
2. Sabuda, Robert (1987). Fire Engine (A Bulky Board Book). Modern Publishing. ISBN 0-87449-233-5.
3. Sabuda, Robert (1987). Helicopter (A Bulky Board Book). Modern Publishing. ISBN 0-87449-234-3.
4. Sabuda, Robert (1987). Magic Carpet (A Bulky Board Book). Modern Publishing. ISBN 0-87449-235-1.
5. Sabuda, Robert (1987). Tugboat (A Bulky Board Book). Modern Publishing. ISBN 0-87449-236-X.
6. Coco, Eugene Bradley; Sabuda, Robert (1988). The Fiddler's Son. Green Tiger Press. ISBN 0-516-09421-1.
7. Coco, Eugene Bradley; Sabuda, Robert (1988). The Wishing Well. Green Tiger Press. ISBN 0-88138-112-8.
8. Lowe, Steve; Thoreau, Henry David; Sabuda, Robert (1990). Walden. Philomel Books. ISBN 0-399-22153-0.
9. Whitman, Walt; Sabuda, Robert (1991). I Hear America Singing. Philomel Books. ISBN 0-399-21808-4.
10. Whitman, Walt; Sabuda, Robert (1991). Earth Verses and Water Rhymes. Atheneum. ISBN 0-689-31693-3.
11. Sabuda, Robert (1992). Saint Valentine. Atheneum. ISBN 0-689-31762-X.
12. Lowe, Steve; Columbus, Christopher; Sabuda, Robert (1992). The Log of Christopher Columbus: The First Voyage: Spring, Summer and Fall 1492. Philomel Books. ISBN 0-399-22139-5.
13. Owen, Roy; Sabuda, Robert (1993). The Ibis and the Egret. Philomel Books. ISBN 0-399-22504-8.
14. Levy, Constance; Sabuda, Robert (1994). The Tree Place and Other Poems. Atheneum. ISBN 0-689-50599-X.
15. Sabuda, Robert (1994). Tutankhamen's Gift. Atheneum. ISBN 0-689-31818-9.
16. Sabuda, Robert (1995). Arthur and the Sword. Atheneum. ISBN 0-689-31987-8.
17. Davol, Marguerite W.; Sabuda, Robert (1997). The Paper Dragon. Atheneum. ISBN 0-689-31992-4.
18. Sabuda, Robert (1999). Blizzard's Robe. Atheneum. ISBN 0-689-81161-6.
19. Sabuda, Robert (2003). Uh-oh, Leonardo! : The Adventures of Providence Traveler, 1503. Atheneum. ISBN 0-689-81160-8.

==== Pop-up books ====
1. Sabuda, Robert (1994). The Christmas Alphabet. Orchard Books. ISBN 0-307-17627-4.
2. Sabuda, Robert (1994). The Mummy's Tomb: A Pop-Up Book. Golden Books. ISBN 0-307-17627-4.
3. Sabuda, Robert (1994). The Knight's Castle: A Pop-Up Book. Golden Books. ISBN 0-307-17626-6.
4. Beach, Thomas (pseudonym) (1994). Creepy, Crawly Halloween Fright. Troll Associates. ISBN 0-8167-3395-3.
5. Sabuda, Robert (1995). Help the Animals of North America (A Pop-Up Book). Reader's Digest. ISBN 0-89577-665-0.
6. Sabuda, Robert (1995). Help the Animals of Asia (A Pop-Up Book). Reader's Digest. ISBN 0-89577-667-7.
7. Sabuda, Robert (1995). Help the Animals of Africa (A Pop-Up Book). Reader's Digest. ISBN 0-89577-668-5.
8. Williams, Nancy; Sabuda, Robert (1995). A Kwanzaa Celebration: A Pop-up Book. Little Simon. ISBN 0-689-80266-8.
9. Sabuda, Robert (1996). The Twelve Days of Christmas: A Pop-Up Celebration. Little Simon. ISBN 0-689-80865-8.
10. Sabuda, Robert (1997). Cookie Count: A Tasty Pop-Up. Little Simon. ISBN 0-689-81767-3.
11. Sabuda, Robert (1998). ABC Disney Pop-Up. Disney Press. ISBN 0-7868-3132-4.
12. Sabuda, Robert (1999). The Movable Mother Goose. Little Simon. ISBN 0-689-83149-8.
13. Sabuda, Robert (2000). The Wonderful Wizard of Oz: Pop-Up. Little Simon. ISBN 0-689-84014-4.
14. Thomas, Pamela; Sabuda, Robert (2000). Brooklyn Pops Up. Little Simon. ISBN 0-689-84019-5.
15. Moore, Clement Clarke; Sabuda, Robert (2002). The Night Before Christmas Pop-up. Little Simon. ISBN 0-689-83899-9.
16. Sabuda, Robert (2003). Alice's Adventures in Wonderland: A Popup Adaptation. Little Simon. ISBN 0-689-84743-2.
17. Sabuda, Robert (2004). America the Beautiful. Little Simon. ISBN 0-689-87421-9.
18. Sabuda, Robert (2005). Winter's Tale: An Original Pop-Up Journey. Little Simon. ISBN 1-4169-0787-4.
19. Sabuda, Robert (2010). Beauty & the Beast: A Pop-up Book of the Classic Fairy Tale. Little Simon. ISBN 978-1-4169-6079-9.
20. Sabuda, Robert; Rosen, Michael J. (September 2011). Chanukah Lights. Candlewick Press. ISBN 978-0-7636-5533-4.
21. Sabuda, Robert (October 2013). The Little Mermaid. Little Simon. ISBN 978-1-4424-5086-8.
22. Sabuda, Robert (October 2014). The Dragon & the Knight. Simon & Schuster Childrens Books. ISBN 978-1-4711-2311-5.
23. Sabuda, Robert (December 2015). The White House: A Pop-Up of Our Nation's Home. Orchard Books. ISBN 978-0-545-54089-6.
24. Sabuda, Robert (2016). Sea Island Pops Up. Librum Artifex. ISBN 978-0-692-59241-0.
25. Sabuda, Robert (September 2016). The Christmas Story. Candlewick Press. ISBN 978-0-7636-8326-9.
26. Sabuda, Robert (2018). Ten Horse Farm. Candlewick. ISBN 978-0-7636-6398-8.
27. Sabuda, Robert (2019). Believe: A Pop-Up Book of Possibilities. Candlewick. p. 24. ISBN 978-0-7636-6397-1.
28. Sabuda, Robert (2021). Love. Candlewick. p. 24. ISBN 978-1-5362-1037-8.

==== Other pop-ups ====
1. Sabuda, Robert (2005). Christmas Alphabet Cards: Collectible Tin Set. Running Press Kids. ISBN 0-7624-2554-7.

==== Authored articles ====
1. Sabuda, Robert (December 20, 2003). "Op-Art; Tired of Shopping? Build a Gift". New York Times.

=== Printed references ===
==== Newspaper biography ====
1. Hedges, Chris (December 9, 2003). "In Him, Storyteller Meets Architect". New York Times.

==== Newspaper articles ====
1. Carvajal, Doreen (November 27, 2000). "Boing! Pop-Up Books Are Growing Up; Flaps, Foldouts and Complexities Attract Adult Eyes". New York Times.

==== News references ====
1. "New York Times Children's Bestseller List". New York Times. 2006.

==== Critical acclaim ====
1. Chapin, Ted (November 14, 2004). "'America the Beautiful,' and 'Liberty's Journey': From Sea to Shining Sea". New York Times.
2. Heller, Steven (November 16, 2003). "Ready for Her Close-Up". New York Times.
3. Marcus, Leonard S. (December 8, 2002). "Children's Books". New York Times.
4. Tzannes, Robin (May 22, 1994). "The Littlest Pharaoh". New York Times.

=== Web references ===
1. "Robert Sabuda.com".
2. "Meet the Artists – Robert Sabuda : Biography". National Center for Children's Illustrated Literature, USA.
3. "Meet the Artists – Robert Sabuda : Critical essay". Betty Carter, National Center for Children's Illustrated Literature, USA.
