= Book collecting =

Activity of collecting books

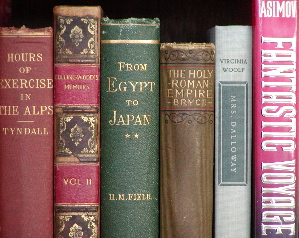
Some inexpensive collectible books: these are, left to right, by Tyndall, Collingwood, H. M. Field, Bryce, Woolf, and Asimov.

Book collecting is the collecting of books, including seeking, locating, acquiring, organizing, cataloging, displaying, storing, and maintaining whatever books are of interest to a given collector. The love of books is bibliophilia, and someone who loves to read, admire, and a person who collects books is often called a bibliophile.

Book prices generally depend on the demand for a given edition which is based on factors such as the number of copies available, the book's condition, and if they were signed by the author (and/or editor or illustrator, if applicable) or by a famous previous owner.

== History ==
In the ancient world, papyri and scrolls (the precursors of the book in codex form) were collected by both institutions and private individuals. In surviving accounts there are references to bibliophile book collectors in that era; Xenophon wrote disparagingly of a man who tried to collect more books than his friends. Seneca the Younger was skeptical of those who collect books they do not read, asking: "What is the use of possessing numberless books and libraries, whose titles their owner can hardly read through in a lifetime?" Book collectors in western antiquity prized accurate transcription and high-quality materials.

In 1344, the English bishop Richard de Bury wrote The Philobiblon, in which he praised the love and appreciation of books. Philip the Good brought together a collection of "about six hundred manuscripts in his possession at the height of his reign", which was the largest private collection of his day.

With the advent of the printing press, invented by Johannes Gutenberg in the 15th century, which resulted in cheaper and more abundant books, and with the contemporaneous economic, social and political changes of the Renaissance, book collecting received a great impetus. Jean Grolier, the Treasurer-General of France, was an important bibliophile and book collector of this period.

With the advent of the Romantic era in the 18th century and its focus on the past, book collectors began to show an interest in old books, antiquarian editions and manuscripts. This new emphasis was nourished by the flood of old books onto the market following the dissolution of monastic and aristocratic libraries during the French Revolution and the Napoleonic Wars.

The British Whig politician George John, 2nd Earl Spencer (1758-1834) collected tens of thousands of volumes. Strengths of his collection included first editions of the classics; works produced by important early presses, an almost complete collection of Aldine editions; and many Bibles.

The English antiquary Sir Thomas Phillipps (1792-1872) collected 40,000 printed books and 60,000 manuscripts. He was called "the greatest collector of manuscript material the world has ever known".

The increasingly wealthy United States during the 19th century saw the appearance of "titan" book collectors, such as the railroad magnate Henry Huntington and the financier and banker J. Pierpont Morgan.

== Prices ==
The Rothschild Prayerbook sold for $13.6 million while the St Cuthbert Gospel sold for $14.7 million. Both of these religious texts were sold in 2012. The Northumberland Bestiary sold for $20 million in 2007. The New Book of Tang sold for $17.1 million in 2018. William Shakespeare’s First Folio, printed in 1623, sold for $9.978 million in 2020. An Action Comics #1 issue sold for a record $3.2 million in 2014.

== Condition ==
Despite appearing in many films and other popular culture, wearing cotton gloves while handling old or rare books does not protect the book, and can increase the risk of inadvertent damage. However, the theatrical effect of showing a rare book being handled with gloved hands may increase its selling price.

== Antiquarian book collecting ==
Antiquarian book collecting may be roughly defined as an interest in books printed prior to 1900 and can encompass interest in 19th, 18th, 17th, 16th, and 15th-century books. Antiquarian book collectors are not exclusively interested in first editions and first printings, although they can be. European books created before 1455 are all hand-written and are therefore one-of-a-kind historical artifacts in which the idea of "edition" and "printing" is irrelevant. Any book printed up to the year 1501 is known as an incunable or incunabulum. Such books command a premium and are particularly sought after by collectors interested in the history of printing.

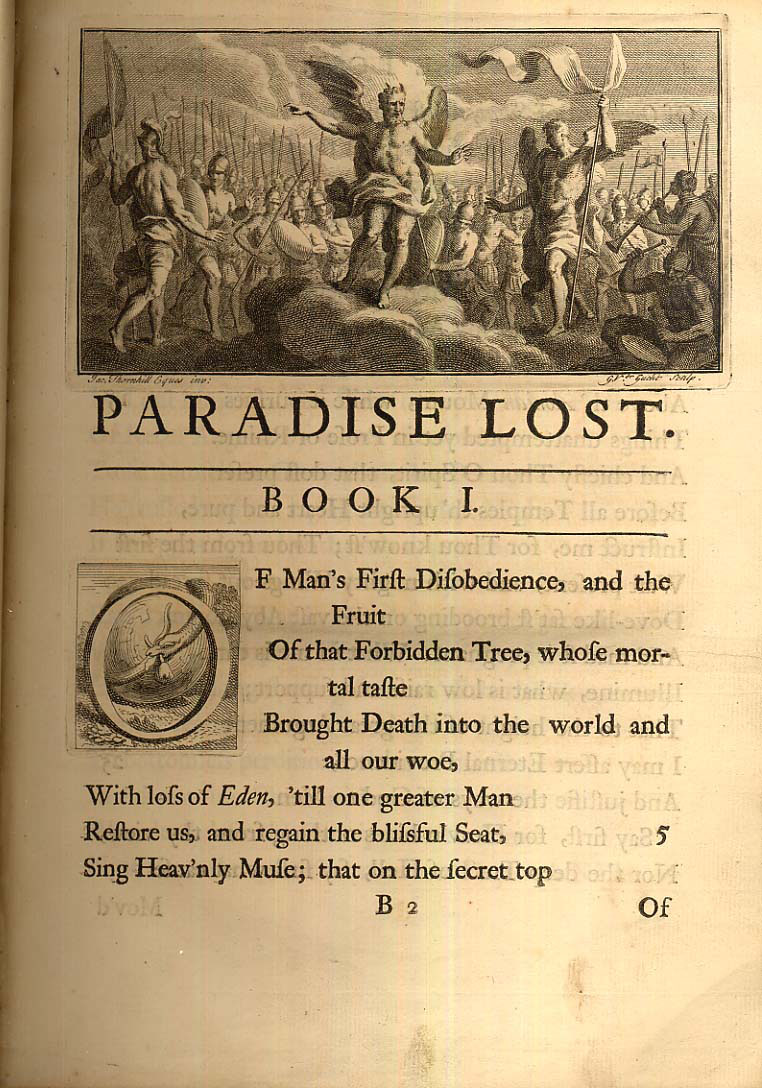
The beginning of Paradise Lost from a 1720 illustrated edition. Not a first edition but desirable among antiquarians.

The first English movable-type printer was Caxton in the late 15th century. Editions of his books from the 15th century are very rare. Occasionally, 16th-century editions similar to Caxton's books appear among antiquarian book dealers and auctions, often fetching very high prices. The last Shakespeare First Folio of 1623 (first edition of the collected works of William Shakespeare) garnered a record-breaking $9,978,000 at Christie's in October 2020.

Books owned by well-known individuals that also have a connection with the author (often as a gift from the author with a written dedication to the recipient) are known as association copies.

The American School Library is a multi-volume boxed set with works by various authors. The only known complete set is held by the Smithsonian Institution's National Museum of American History.

=== Prominent book collectors ===
- John Roland Abbey
- John Quincy Adams
- Clifton Waller Barrett
- Chester Beatty
- William Thomas Beckford
- Martin Bodmer
- The Book Club of Detroit
- Thomas Kimball Brooker
- John Carter Brown
- Boudewijn Büch
- Anthony Collins
- George Cosmatos
- Robert Bruce Cotton
- Jules Desnoyers
- Joseph W. Drexel
- Alexandre Dumas, père
- Umberto Eco
- John Evelyn
- DeCoursey Fales
- Ian Fleming
- Henry Clay Folger
- Michael Foot
- R. B. Freeman
- George III
- Edward Gibbon
- Stephen Jay Gould
- Robert Harley, Earl of Oxford
- Rush Hawkins
- Richard Heber
- Henry II of France
- Philip Hofer
- Harrison D. Horblit
- Arthur A. Houghton Jr.
- Henry E. Huntington
- Thomas Jefferson
- Jerome Kern
- Geoffrey Keynes
- John Maynard Keynes
- Aleksey Khludov
- Jay I. Kislak
- George Frederick Kunz
- Karl Lagerfeld
- Mark Lanier
- Robert Lenkiewicz
- Wilmarth Sheldon Lewis
- Josiah K. Lilly Jr.
- Frederick Locker-Lampson
- Antonio Magliabechi
- Alberto Manguel
- H. Bradley Martin
- Larry McMurtry
- Wolfgang Menzel
- Dewitt Miller
- David Scott Mitchell
- Michel de Montaigne
- J. Pierpont Morgan
- William Morris
- Christoph Gottlieb von Murr
- A. Edward Newton
- Friedrich Nietzsche
- Charles Nodier
- William Osler
- Samuel Pepys
- Charles Dyson Perrins
- Sir Thomas Phillipps
- Francis Place
- William S. Reese
- Abraham Rosenbach
- Lessing J. Rosenwald
- Ellen G. K. Ruben
- Joaquín Rubio y Muñoz
- Arturo Alfonso Schomburg
- Martin Schoyen
- John MacKay Shaw
- Frederick Skiff
- Adam Smith
- Walter W. Stone
- Thomas W. Streeter
- George Thomason
- Jay S. Walker
- Levinus Warner
- Andrew Dickson White
- John Griswold White
- Harry Elkins Widener

== In China ==
The history of book collecting in China dates back over two millennia. An important effort to collect books in China was made during the early Han dynasty by the government, as many important books were burned during the Qin dynasty. From then on, book collecting began to flourish in China, particularly after the invention of block printing during the early Tang dynasty, with both imperial and private collections blooming throughout the country. However, the systematic study of book collecting began only during the Qing dynasty.

=== Terminology ===
- Cangshulou (Chinese: 藏書樓 "book collecting tower"): library, such as the private Tianyi Chamber (天一閣), the oldest existing library in China, or the imperial Wenyuan Chamber (文淵閣), where the works collected in the Complete Library of the Four Treasuries were reposited
- Jinxiangben (巾箱本 "headscarf box edition"): ancient pocket edition
- Jiupingzhuang (舊平裝 "old paperback") or Jiushu (舊書 "old books"): old books published after 1911, when the Qing dynasty was overthrown
- Maobianben (毛邊本 "hairy-side edition"): uncut editions
- Songben (宋本 "Song edition") or Songban (宋版 "Song edition"): block printed books published during the Song dynasty, highly valued by collectors
- Xianzhuangshu (線裝書 "thread-bound book"): thread-bound books, usually referred to those published before 1911

== See also ==
- Bibliomania
- The Book Collector
- Book Collectors Society of Australia
- Book design
- Bookbinding
- Bookplate
- Collectables
- Fellowship of American Bibliophilic Societies
- Imprint
- Manuscript
- Private library
- Tape trading
- Text (disambiguation)
- Tsundoku

== Works cited ==
- Holzenberg, Eric J. (2019-09-16). "Book Collecting". In Eliot, Simon; Rose, Jonathan (eds.). A Companion to the History of the Book. Wiley. pp. 815–826. doi:10.1002/9781119018193.ch54. ISBN 978-1-119-01817-9. S2CID 243289082.
