= Powell's Books =

Bookstore chain selling new and used books

Coordinates: 45°31′24.04″N 122°40′53.71″W

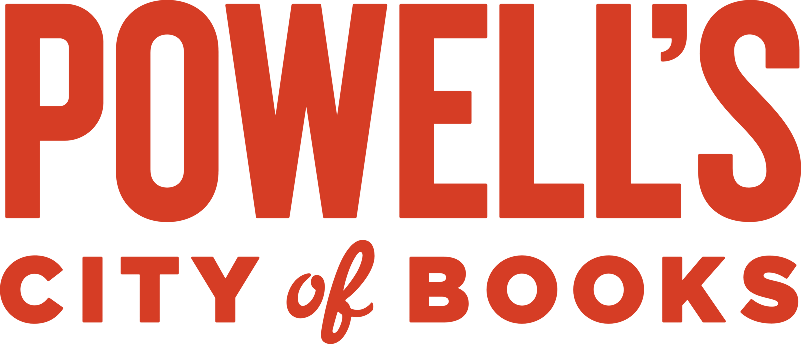

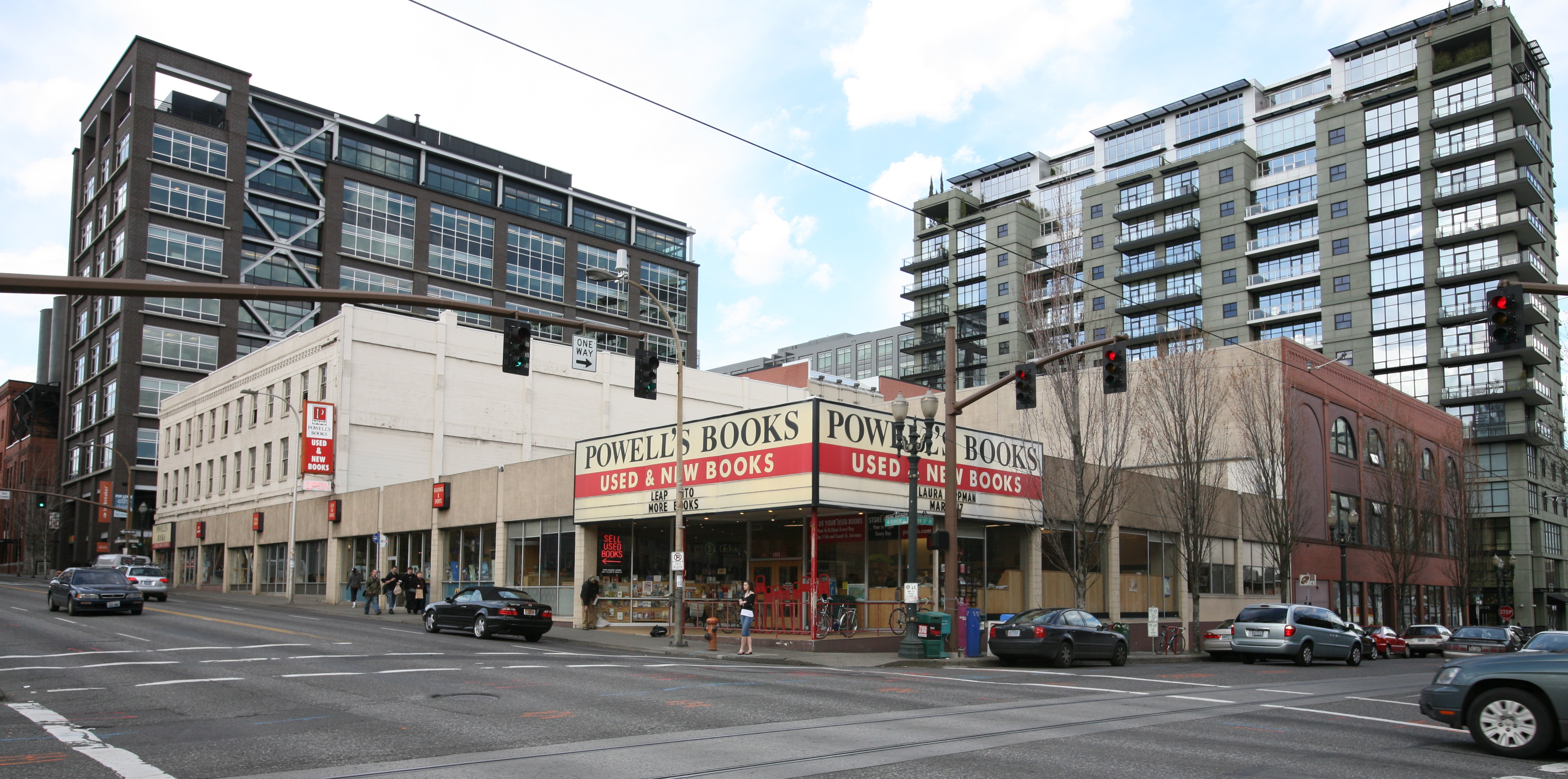
- Powell's flagship store in Downtown Portland, Oregon
- Industry: Specialty retail
- Founded: 1971 (55 years ago)
- Founder: Walter Powell
- Headquarters: Portland, Oregon, United States
- Number of locations: 5
- Key people: Emily Powell; Chase Powell
- Products: New, used, and rare books, magazines, cards, and sidelines
- Revenue: $45 million (as of 2009)
- Owner: Walter Powell (1971–1982); Michael Powell (1982–2010); Emily Powell (2010–present)
- Number of employees: About 500 (as of 2010)
- Website: www.powells.com

Powell's Books is a chain of bookstores, based in Portland, Oregon. Their flagship store, dubbed Powell's City of Books, claims to be the largest independent new and used bookstore in the world.

In addition to Powell's City of Books, Powell's operates four other Portland area stores, including the newest store at the Portland International Airport, as well as a satellite store in the town of Condon.

== History ==
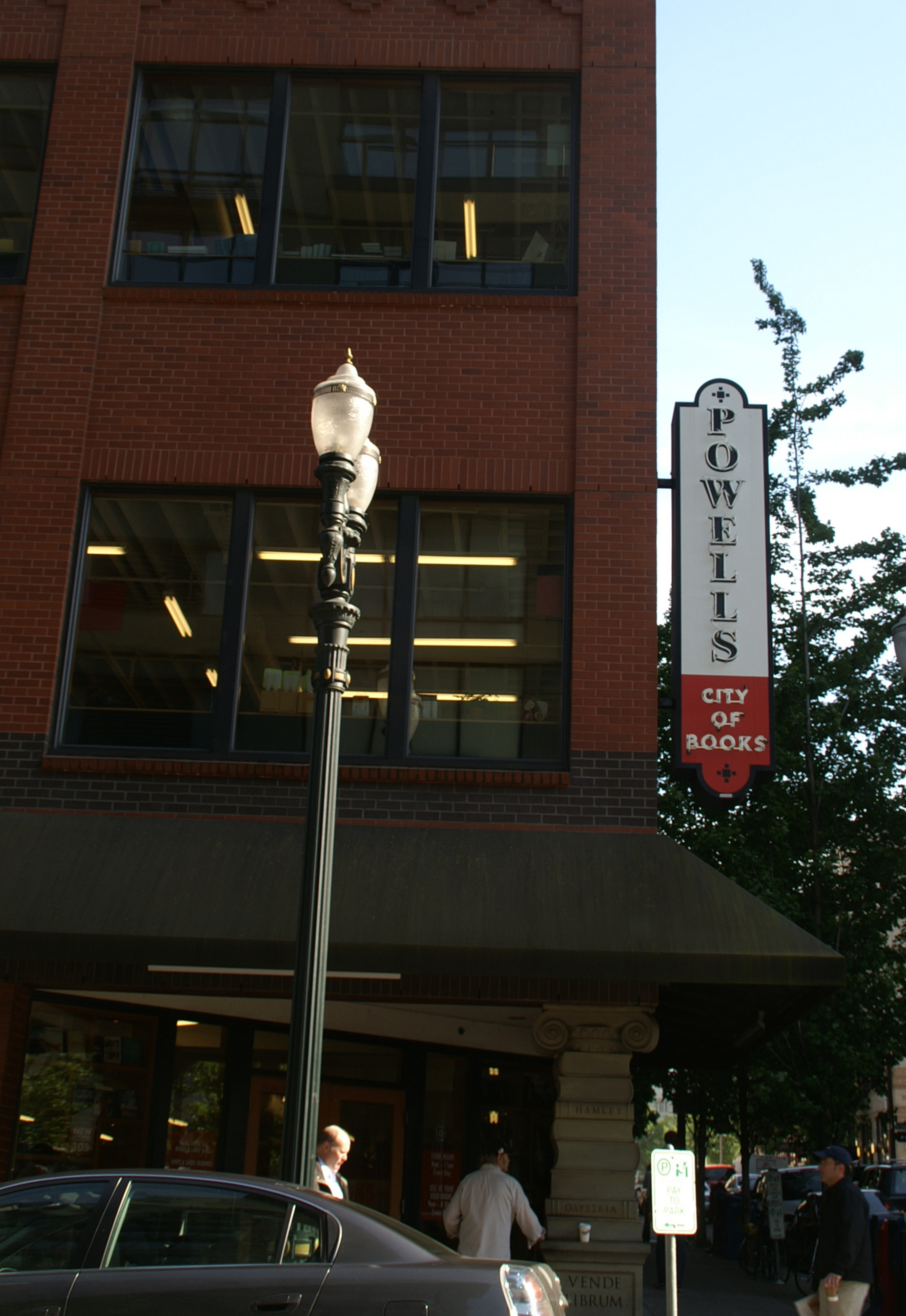
The City of Book's NW 11th & Couch entrance, featuring the "Pillar of Books"

=== 20th century ===
Walter Powell founded Powell's in 1971. His son, Michael Powell, had started a bookstore in Chicago, Illinois, in 1970 which specialized in used, rare, and discounted books, primarily of an academic and scholarly nature. In 1979, Michael Powell joined his father in Portland, right after his father's store was not offered a lease renewal; within a year, they found the location that became its current headquarters. Michael bought the bookstore from his father in 1982.

In 1984, Powell's opened its first branch store, in a suburban shopping center named Loehmann's Plaza (later renamed Cascade Plaza), near Washington Square. The new branch was not a replica of its City of Books location; Powell was concerned that the "edgy" neighborhood of its headquarters location was limiting its customer base, so the new store was "fairly fancy" with white shelving, a tile floor, and banners over the aisles. It was also four times the size of the typical chain bookstore.

A travel bookstore was established in 1985 on Pioneer Courthouse Square, and other stores followed, one a year for the next few years. By the early 1990s, Powell's bookstores were part of the resurgence of the independent bookstore, which collectively made 32 percent of book sales in the U.S. The travel store closed in 2005.

Powell's established its Internet presence in 1993, beginning with email and FTP-based access to its technical bookstore; it has since expanded to incorporate fiction and other genres as a traditional ecommerce site. Their website was established in 1994, before Amazon.com, and has contributed substantially to the chain's recent growth.

The City of Books location grew to its current size after an expansion that opened in 1999; it included a new entrance facing the Pearl District which featured the "Pillar of Books", a Tenino sandstone carving depicting a stack of eight of the world's great books, on a base with the inscription "Buy the book, read the book, enjoy the book, sell the book" in Latin. For the year ending June 2000, Powell's revenue was $41.8 million.

=== 21st century ===
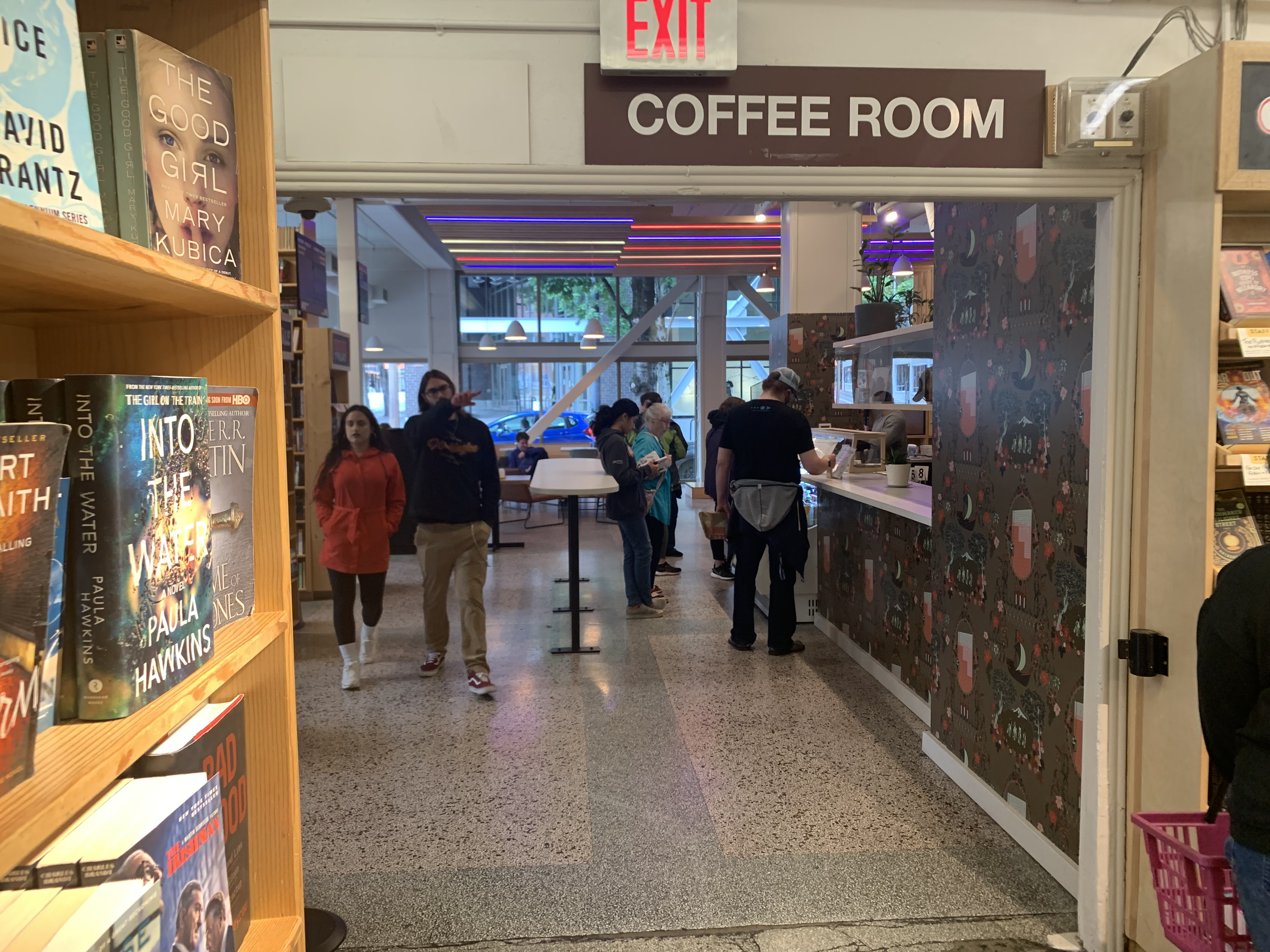
The City of Book's Coffee Room

In 2002, Powell's was cited by USA Today as one of America's 10 best bookstores.

In January 2008, Powell's announced plans to expand the downtown City of Books by adding as many as two floors to the store's southeast corner. The expansion was due to add at least 10,000 square feet (930 square metres) of new retail space. Plans submitted to the Portland Design Commission in November 2008 called for a rooftop garden atop the new addition and an "art cube" over a redesigned main entrance.

In March 2010, Michael Powell confirmed plans to hand over management of the business to his daughter Emily as of July. That same month, Powell's announced it would close its technical bookstore on the North Park Blocks, moving its sections on math, science, computing, engineering, construction, and transportation into "Powell's Books Building 2" at the corner of 10th and Couch Street, near the main City of Books location. The consolidation was in response to a five-year decline in brick-and-mortar sales of technical books in favor of online sales.

In October 2010, Powell's announced it had bought 7,000 books from the library of author Anne Rice; Powell's offered these association copies on their website. The bookstore was revealed as a charter member of the Google eBooks service when the news was announced by Google on December 6, 2010.

In June 2011, Powell's participated in Google Offers during that service's first month of operation; according to TechCrunch—which characterized Powell's as a "Portland institution"—"5,000 Powell’s vouchers sold out in a matter of hours", making it "most popular deal in the month."

Starting in May 2012, Powell's began offering access to print on demand books via the Espresso Book Machine.

In early 2013, Emily Powell announced that Miriam Sontz, the company's chief operating officer, would take over as chief executive officer.

In 2016, CNN rated it one of the "coolest" bookstores in the world.

CEO Miriam Sontz retired in January 2019. Patrick Bassett, a veteran business consultant, has been the CEO since October 2020. Emily Powell remains president and owner.

In 2024, Powell's held its first-ever used book sale out of its Northwest Portland warehouse, drawing over 10,000 attendees, some reporting wait times of over four or five hours to get in. Powell's held a second annual sale in July 2025.

=== Logos ===
Powell's Books logos

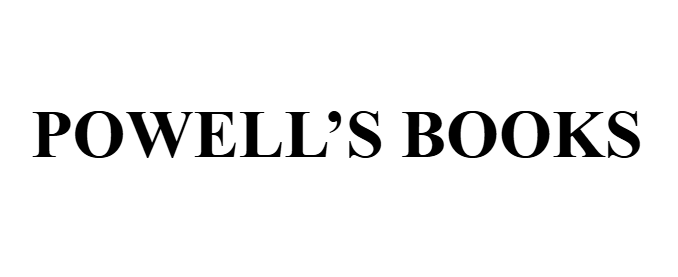
Pre–2005

2005–2013

2013–2014

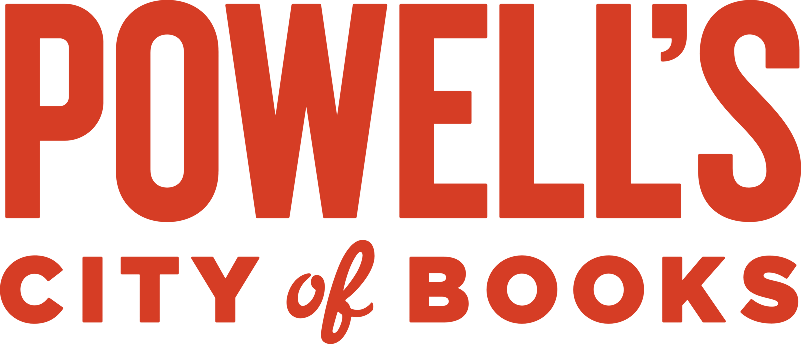
2014–present

== Locations ==
Powell's Books locations
Picture	Name	Location
	Powell's City of Books	Portland, Oregon (Downtown/Pearl District)
	Powell's Books on Hawthorne Powell's Neighborhood of Books	Portland, Oregon (Hawthorne)
	Powell's Books at Cedar Hills Crossing Powell's Suburb of Books	Beaverton, Oregon (Cedar Hills Crossing Mall)
	Powell's Books at PDX	Portland, Oregon (Portland International Airport)
	Powell's Books Condon	Condon, Oregon

=== Powell's City of Books ===
Powell's flagship store, dubbed Powell's City of Books, is located in the Pearl District on the edge of downtown and occupies a full city block between NW 10th and 11th Avenues and between W. Burnside and NW Couch Streets. It contains over 68,000 square feet (6,300 square metres), about 1.6 acres, of retail floor space.

The City of Books has nine color-coded rooms and over 3,500 different sections.

The inventory for its retail and online sales is over four million new, used, rare, and out-of-print books. As of 2009, Powell's was buying around 3,000 used books a day.

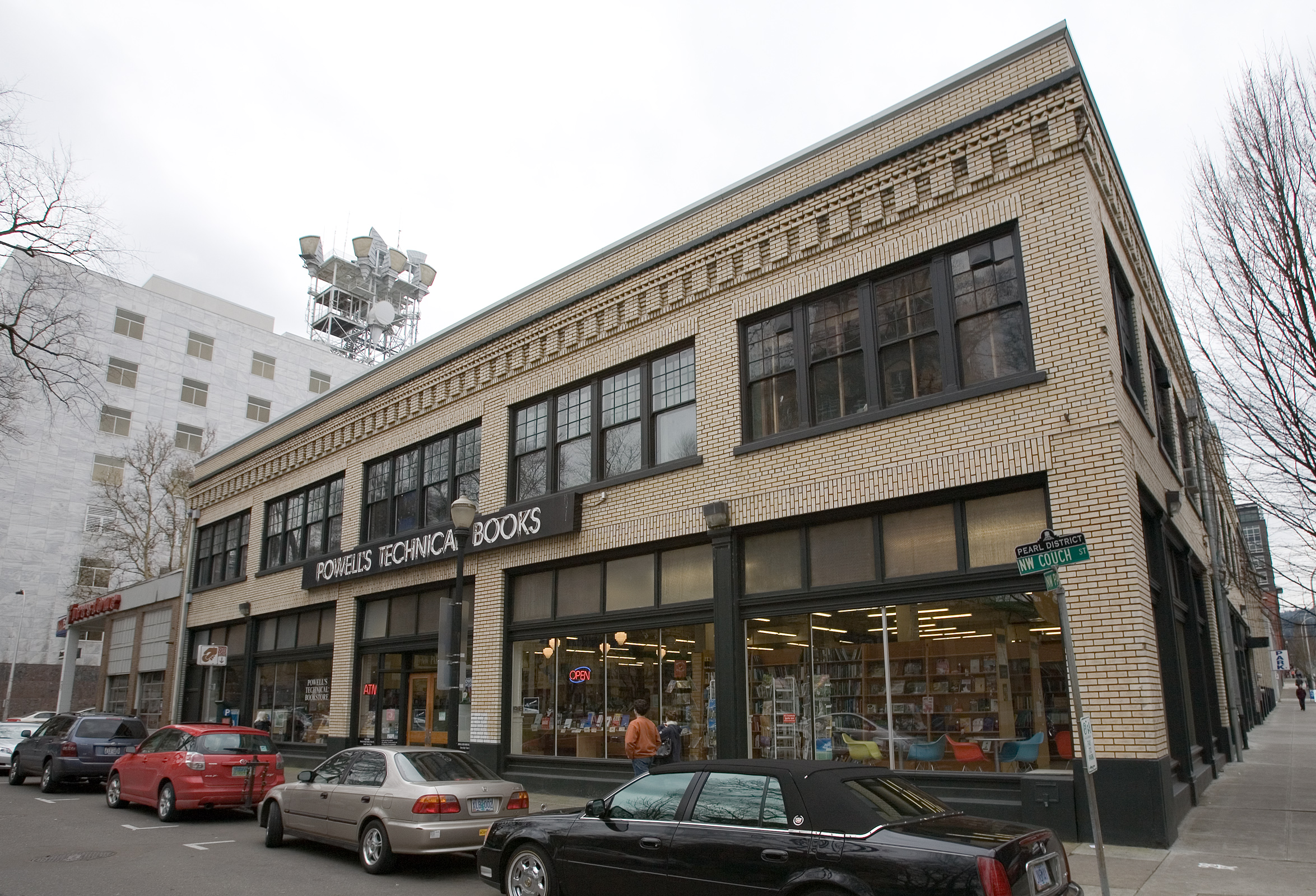
Powell's Technical Books, which closed in 2010.

=== Former locations ===
In the 1980s, Powell's had a location across from Washington Square Mall in Tigard. This was the chain's second location. This location was eventually replaced by their Cedar Hills Crossing location.

From 1985 to 2005, Powell's operated a travel bookstore in Downtown at Pioneer Courthouse Square.

Powell's formerly operated two specialty locations. Powell's Technical Books, which contained books on math, science, computing, engineering, construction, and transportation, was located adjacent to their flagship store in Downtown. Powell's Books for Home & Garden was located adjacent to the Hawthorne store. Both locations were closed, in 2010 and 2020, respectively, due to decreasing in-person sales of these types of books. Their collections were consolidated into the other locations.

== Labor relations ==
In 1991, following some post-holiday lay-offs, some of Powell's employees formed an organizing committee, seeking to become part of the Oregon Public Employees Union (OPEU). They succeeded in getting more than 35% of the workers to sign union cards, but because less than 65% of them had done so—the OPEU's suggested threshold—they decided not to file for a union certification election. In response to issues identified by the organizing employees, Powell's updated and expanded its employee handbook in April 1992 with changes that addressed processes for problem solving and grievances, the probation and termination procedure, and other employee assistance, among other changes.

In September 1998, an email from Powell's managers announcing reductions in employee's wage increases prompted the creation of a new organizing committee of 26 employees. They chose the International Longshore and Warehouse Union (ILWU) because they could charter their own self-governing local union which would include about 350 employees serving in a variety of jobs in all stores and in the Internet, corporate, and shipping departments. By March 1999, they had filed for a union certification election with the National Labor Relations Board. A month later, by a vote of 161–155, ILWU Local 5 became official.

In September 1999, ILWU Local 5 met for the first time with Powell's management, to begin the contract bargaining process. After some early successes, 2000 saw a slowdown in the discussions, followed by rallies, filings of unfair labor practices, an unsuccessful decertification campaign, a one-day shutdown of the shipping department (accompanied by the slashing of a van's tire), and federal mediation. A three-year contract was finally announced in August 2000.

In February 2011, Powell's announced the layoffs of 31 employees, over 7% of its unionized workforce, in “response to the unprecedented, rapidly changing nature of the book industry." It was the first round of layoffs since the store's workers formed a union. A union representative said that Powell's had reduced its workforce by about 40 in the prior year through attrition, but felt that layoffs were still necessary because of a decline in sales of new books and a rise in health care costs.

In response to the COVID-19 pandemic, Powell's announced the closing of its five locations and the termination of nearly all employees in mid-March 2020. CEO Emily Powell did not provide the precise number of layoffs in the letter she released on March 17, 2020. However, roughly 85% of the 400 members of the company's unionized workforce were terminated. The union noted that only 49 of the more than 100 former employees were union-represented, and the remaining managers were now performing front-line duties typically performed by represented employees. This was in response to a large surge in online orders. In July 2020, Powell's announced that the store and kiosk in the Portland International Airport would remain closed permanently. However, Powell's returned to the airport with a small kiosk in 2024 and a full store in 2026.

As Powell's gradually began re-hiring staff beginning in April 2021, former employees were forced to apply for open positions as new employees. Powell's claimed that their right to return to their old jobs had expired, and an agreement to extend those rights (and maintain previous pay levels) had not been reached between Powell's and the union. The majority of hired staff have been previous employees.

Powell's employees went on strike: the store was closed on Labor Day, September 4, 2023.

== Reception ==
Powell's won in the Best Bookstore category of Willamette Week's annual 'Best of Portland' readers' poll in 2025.

== See also ==
- Cameron's Books and Magazines
