= Skiff (disambiguation) =

A skiff is any of a number of types of small boat.

Skiff may also refer to:

- Skiff (company), seller of e-reader content
- Skiff (email service), an email service
- Skiff, Alberta, a small hamlet in Canada
- 2554 Skiff, an asteroid
- Skiffs, an 1877 painting by French artist Gustave Caillebotte
- R-29RMU Sineva, a Russian submarine-launched ballistic missile
- Sensitive compartmented information facility (SCIF, pronounced "skiff"), an enclosed area within a building that is used to process classified information
- Skiff, a character in the film Planet 51
- Skiff, a railboat in the television series Thomas & Friends

== People with the surname ==
- Bill Skiff (1895–1976), American baseball player, manager and scout
- Brian A. Skiff, American astronomer
- Frederick Skiff (1867–1947), American author, collector and bibliophile
- Jennifer Skiff (born 1961), American author, journalist and television producer
- John Victor Skiff (1908–1964), American environmental conservationist and public servant

== See also ==
- SCIF (disambiguation)
- Skif (disambiguation)
- Skiff Lake (New Brunswick), Canada
