= Philobiblon Club =

The Philobiblon Club is a society of bibliophiles founded in Philadelphia in 1893. Its meetings take place at the Rosenbach Museum and Library following a long residence at the Franklin Inn Club. The organization includes collectors, dealers, and authors.

It is part of the Fellowship of American Bibliophilic Societies (FABS).

== Notable members ==
- George William Childs
- Horace Howard Furness
- James A. MacAlister
- Samuel W. Pennypacker
- William Pepper
- A. S. W. Rosenbach
- Joseph George Rosengarten

== Publications ==
- Constitution and By-laws of The Philobiblon Club (Philadelphia, 1893)
- The excellent priviledge of liberty and property, being a reprint and facsimile of the first American edition of Magna charta, printed in 1687 (1897)
- Dickens's Doctors: A Paper Read Before the Philobiblon Club, May 28, 1903 (1903)
- A fragment of the chronicles of Nathan Ben Saddi (1904)
- Samuel W. Pennypacker: An Address Delivered before the Philobiblon Club, October 26, 1916 (1917)

== Officers ==
- Janine Pollock, President
- Lynne Farrington, Vice President
- Francis W. Hoeber, Secretary
- Eric Pumroy, Treasurer
