= Cameron's =

Cameron's may refer to:

- Cameron's Books and Magazines, Portland, Oregon, United States
- Cameron's Seafood Market, Rockville, Maryland, United States
- Camerons Brewery, United Kingdom

== See also ==
- Camerons (disambiguation)
