= PBA Galleries =

PBA Galleries is a San Francisco auction house specializing in rare books, manuscripts, maps and atlases, photographs, golf books, Americana, modern literature and related materials. PBA conducts approximately twenty-five gallery auctions in a calendar year

== History ==
PBA was founded in 1992 by former employees of California Book Auction Galleries, which closed following the passing of its founder, Maurice F. Powers. PBA Galleries was first located at 139 Townsend Street, in the SOMA area of San Francisco (just a block away from the present location of ATT Park, home of the San Francisco Giants). In the spring of 1996 the company moved to its current location, 1233 Sutter Street in San Francisco’s Financial District, the former premises of the defunct sports memorabilia auctioneer Richard Wolffer's Auctions, Inc. PBA was purchased by its current owner Sharon Gee in January 2013.
