= Scarab Club =

- U.S. National Register of Historic Places
- Michigan State Historic Site
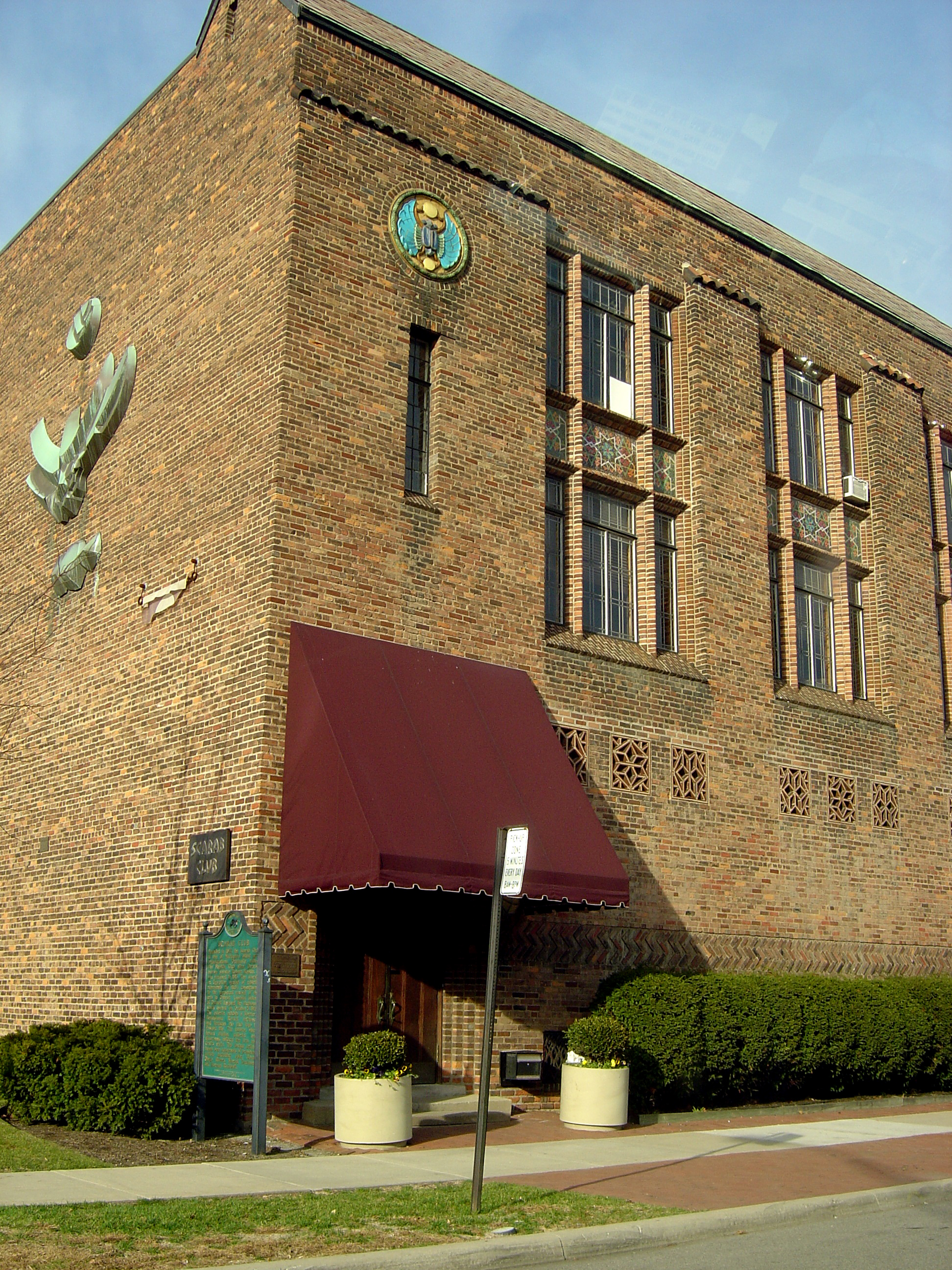
- Interactive map
- Location: 217 Farnsworth Street; Detroit, Michigan
- Coordinates: 42°21′35.46″N 83°3′46.15″W
- Built: 1928
- Architect: Lancelot Sukert
- Architectural style: Arts and Crafts
- NRHP reference No.: 79001176

Significant dates
- Added to NRHP: November 20, 1979
- Designated MSHS: July 26, 1974

The Scarab Club (commonly referred to as Historic Scarab Club of Detroit) is an artists' club, gallery, and studio in the Cultural Center Historic District of Detroit, Michigan, located at 217 Farnsworth Street, near the Detroit Institute of Arts and the Detroit Science Center. It was designated a Michigan State Historic Site in 1974 and listed on the National Register of Historic Places in 1979.

== The early years ==
The Scarab Club's predecessor, an informal association named the Hopkin Club, was formed in 1909. It was named after the founder, marine painter Robert Hopkin. The Scarab Club itself was formed in 1916. The club's vision since inception was

“to promote the mutual acquaintance of art lovers and art workers, to stimulate and guide toward practical expression the artistic sense of the people of Detroit, and to advance the knowledge and love of the Fine Arts in every possible manner.”

In 1913, the club grew in popularity, and member Lancelot Sukert, a Detroit architect, designed the current clubhouse, which opened its doors on October 5, 1928. The interior of the club is decorated with works of art created and contributed by members over the decades. The building showcases tile sculptures from Pewabic Pottery, including the Scarab Club logo. The ceiling beams of the lounge once served as the club's guest book, and poet Vachel Lindsay signed as one of the first visitors. Since then, signing the beam has become a ceremonial honor, and the autographs of artists including John Sloan, Diego Rivera, Pablo Davis, Marcel Duchamp, Norman Rockwell, and John Sinclair appear on the beams.

American artist, inventor, and automobile pioneer George Schuyler Hodges, of Pontiac, Michigan, was a charter member of the club.

The club's themed costumed balls, held from 1917 to 1950, were the single most important social event in Detroit each year. Life magazine covered the 1937 event with a two-page photo spread, and The Detroit News and The Detroit Free Press also gave the annual balls two pages in their photo sections. Radio station WJR broadcast live from the 1937 "Scarabean Cruise" ball.

For many years The Book Club of Detroit held its regular meetings at the Scarab Club.

The annual Exhibition of Michigan Artists at the Detroit Institute of Arts was originated by the Scarab Club in 1911. In 1915 the Scarab Club Prize became the top award and in 1917 the first Scarab Club Gold Medal was awarded. The gold medal is still the club's most prestigious award, given each December at the Gold Medal Exhibition and Dinner.

== The building ==
The clubhouse was built in 1928 in the Arts and Crafts style by architect and member Lancelot Sukert. The exterior mosaic tiles, which appeared in 1928 renderings, were not completed until the 1980s, when they were finished by W.P.A. muralist and member Edgar Yaeger, who was a junior member of the club in 1928. The ceramic scarab embedded over the front entrance was designed by sculptor Horace Colby and fired at Pewabic Pottery.

The original paneled wood entry in the front hints at intrigue inside, while a brick-walled courtyard in the rear of the building conjures up more pastoral images, with its exquisite flower gardens, fountain and statuary. The club contains several galleries and lounges, as well as six working artist studios. The second floor lounge is unique for its massive ceiling beams painted by members in 1928 and signed by more than 230 artists since, including Diego Rivera, Norman Rockwell, Marshall Fredericks and Pablo Davis. Other beams were painted to depict events in the club's history. The lounge also contains a fireplace with mural depicting different levels of club membership, painted by Paul Honoré. Original mica and metal lighting and furnishings complete the decor.
