= Skif =

Skif or SKIF may refer to:

- Skif (ATGM), a Ukrainian anti-tank guided missile system
- Skif, a character from the Ukrainian video game S.T.A.LK.E.R. 2: Heart Of Chornobyl
- SKIF - Shotokan Karate-Do International Federation
- SKIF Nizhny Novgorod, a professional ice hockey team in Nizhny Novgorod, Russia
- Skif Paragliding, a Ukrainian paraglider manufacturer
- Sotsyalistishe Kinder Farband (S.K.I.F.), a Jewish Socialist political party and the youth organization of the Jewish Labour Bund
- Skif, an alternative name for the Soviet spacecraft Polyus (spacecraft)
- Skif PLUS (Skif Dnipropetrovsk Oblast Organization of Scouts), a Ukrainian scouting organization in Dnipropetrovsk Oblast
- Skifterat, a nickname of the professional football club KF Gjilani based in Gjilan, Kosovo
- Sergey Kuryokhin International Festival (SKIF), a music festival in the Kuryokhin Center of Saint Petersburg, Russia

== See also ==
- Skiff (disambiguation)
