= Dewitt Miller =

Dewitt Miller (March 1, 1857 – July 29, 1911) was an educator, librarian, journalist, minister, orator, and book collector.

== Early life and education ==
Jahu Dewitt Miller was born in Cross River, New York, on March 1, 1857, to Jahu and Phebe (Seymour) Miller. His father was a farmer and blacksmith.

Miller attended public schools and in 1871 he entered the Collegiate Institute at Fort Edward, New York. Upon graduation, he immediately became a member of the faculty. Although known by his first name, Miller used his middle name professionally.

== Occupations ==
Miller briefly worked as a freelance journalist and as a shipping clerk in a New York City mercantile. In 1880, he returned to teaching as "Professor of History and Mental Philosophy" at Pennington Seminary in Pennington, New Jersey. Miller was also a lay minister in the Methodist denomination, and his sermons were so popular that he left the pulpit for the lecture platform. Among his "popular lectures" were "The Uses of Ugliness", "Our Country's Possibilities and Perils", "The Self-Sufficiency of the Republic", and "The Reveries of a Bachelor". Miller had a very casual style of dressing and rarely wore a hat, which was very unusual for American men at the time. When he did wear a hat, it was usually his antiquated white beaver hat. His dress and his wit often led others to characterize him as a humorous lecturer, which he did not like. "I am not a humorous lecturer," he stated, "Things present themselves to me in a certain light. I state them as I see them. For some reason or other people laugh. But I am not a humorous lecturer!"

== Personal library ==
Miller was an obsessive book collector, which began in his youth. About 1888, he started to appreciate books as works of art by collecting the works of William Pickering. Miller amassed a nearly comprehensive collection of the works of John Baskerville.

A memorial stone placed by the 1912 class of National Park Seminary in memory of Miller.

Although Miller was often heard to say "I care nothing for first editions", he owned many and compared first edition copies he owned to those that sold for high prices at auction. His biographer, Leon H. Vincent stated, "No one has heard him say that he cared nothing for his first edition of Boswell's Johnson. When news came of the splendid sum fetched by Gray's Elegy at the Hoe sale, Miller got out his copy for inspection and comment. A very good copy it was, and cost him nearly three dollars."

Throughout his life, Miller kept his collections in several locations and always traveled with many books. The bulk of his collection was kept in an unused country store at Carmel, New York, where his sister was the "caretaker". In January 1902, this collection became a library at National Park Seminary, a girls' school in Forest Glen Park, Maryland, founded by his friends John and Vesta Cassedy. The library remained at National Park Seminary until the property was condemned by the U.S. Army during World War II, when the contents were dispersed at a public sale. The building was renovated in May 2008 as a single-family home.

== Death ==
Miller was in good health until a month before his death. He became ill while attending a chautauqua in Boise, Idaho, and his subsequent appearances in California were canceled. Miller died in Boise on July 29, 1911 and was buried on August 7, 1911 in Cross River, New York. The cause of death was given as heart failure.

== Published works ==
- The Farmer and His Future (Poughkeepsie, NY: Eastman College), 1898. [Contains Miller's essay, "Love, Courtship and Marriage".]
