= Discourse (disambiguation) =

Discourse is a use of written or spoken communication.

Discourse or discourses may also refer to:

- Domain of discourse, the collection of objects being discussed in a specific discourse
- Discourse (linguistics), approaches to study written, vocal, or sign language use
- Conversation, interactive, spontaneous communication between two or more people

== Literature ==
- Discourses (Meher Baba), a book by Indian religious teacher Meher Baba
- Discourses, a series of books by Greek historian of the Roman Empire Dio Chrysostom (c.40 – c.120)
- Fihi Ma Fihi or Discourses of Rumi, a book by Jalal ad-Din Muhammad Rumi
- Discourses (1609–1683), a 1701 book by Benjamin Whichcote, leader of the Cambridge Platonists
- Discourse on the Arts and Sciences or First Discourse, an essay by philosopher Jean-Jacques Rousseau written in 1750
- Discourse on Inequality or Second Discourse, a work by philosopher Jean-Jacques Rousseau written in 1754
- Discourse on Metaphysics, a short treatise written by Gottfried Wilhelm Leibniz in 1686
- Discourse on the Method a philosophical and autobiographical treatise published by René Descartes in 1637
- Discourses of Epictetus, a series of books by the Greek Stoic philosopher Epictetus (c.55 - c.135)
- Four discourses, four fundamental types of discourse identified by Jacques Lacan
- Discourses on Livy, a 1531 book by Niccolò Machiavelli

== Other uses ==
- Discourse (software), an open-source discussion forum platform software system
- The Public Discourse, a magazine

== See also ==
- Text (disambiguation)
- Discorsi (disambiguation)
