= SCIF (disambiguation) =

SCIF is an acronym for Sensitive compartmented information facility, an enclosure protecting United States secrets.

SCIF may also refer to:

- State Compensation Insurance Fund, a California government-owned workers' compensation insurer
- Safari Club International Foundation, the charitable arm of Safari Club International
- Symmetric Communication Interface, a low-level software library for memory and communication handling between a Xeon Phi Coprocessor and its host.
- SCI Foundation, a non-profit initiative that works with governments in sub-Saharan African countries to develop sustainable programmes against parasitic worm infections
- Stars Campaign for Interracial Friendship, a 1958/59 anti-racist movement.

== See also ==
- Skiff (disambiguation)
