= Bibliophile mailing list =

Email list

Bibliophile Mailing List
- Website type: e-list and virtual community
- Owner: Lynn DeWeese-Parkinson
- Creator: Michael Medlin
- Website: www.bibliophilegroup.com
- Registration: Subscription
- Launched: 1994
- Current status: 1000 members

The Bibliophile Mailing List is an electronic mailing list for sellers and collectors of rare, out-of-print and scarce books. Booksellers, librarians, students, scholars, and book lovers, share news and discussions on all manner of topics of interest to bibliophiles, as well as posting books wanted and books for sale listings.

== History ==
The Bibliophile Mailing List was started in 1994 by Michael Medlin at the Claremont Colleges in the United States. By early 1995 the Iris.Claremont.Edu server hosting the list could no longer handle the bandwidth. The list membership had grown to over 550, and with an average of 15 to 20 posts per day, the volume of email was large. In February 1995 responsibility for managing the list was taken on by Shoshana Edwards, owner of Books From Bree. The list was moved to SmartDOCS.com in the Santa Clarita Valley of Southern California, where it was run on an Oracle-based server.

In the summer of 1997 Lynn DeWeese-Parkinson took over the list adding a bit of whimsy by changing the title from "List Owner" to "Grand Poohbah" and declaring its location in the polity of Bibliotenango. The list and the whimsy has continued with events such as the annual "running of the book scouts" on the day of St. John of God, the patron of booksellers. Today its membership is just over 1000 booksellers, collectors, librarians, and general bibliophiles.

== Operation ==
Bibliophile is a closed list. Only subscribers are allowed to post and are expected to observe the amenities of good manners and professional behavior. It is not monitored but the discussions are followed by its Grand Poohbah who attempts to keep them within freely drawn bounds. It has a fee of $30 per year due after a two-week free trial period. Its members are drawn from around the world and include many of the most knowledgeable of bibliophiles.

== See also ==
- Books in the United States
