= Steve "Pablo" Davis =

- Born: July 5, 1916; Philadelphia, Pennsylvania
- Died: January 5, 2013 (aged 96); Rochester, Michigan
- Occupation: Artist

Steve "Pablo" Davis (born Paul Meier Klienbordt; July 7, 1916 – January 5, 2013) was an American artist, lifelong communist activist and Detroit community organizer. He was the last living member of the team of artists who worked with Diego Rivera on the Detroit Industry mural which is in the central courtyard, Rivera Court, of the Detroit Institute of Arts.

== Early life ==
Davis was raised by his English father and Ashkinazi Jewish mother immigrant parents in Philadelphia. His mother had wanted to name him Pablo, his father wanted to name him after a recently deceased uncle in England, Percival. An elder sister explained the boy would be tormented at that time in this country if named Percival, so the parents compromised with "Paul"—or so his mother thought. He worked as a coal miner at age 14 until he became involved in a violent strike. When appearing before a judge for his riot involvement, "Paul" learned his father had secretly created his legal birth certificate with the name Percival. Obviously, not knowing it to be his name and resenting his father's deception, he never went by Percival. After this strike he saw an ad in the paper noting Diego Rivera was to begin work on a mural at the Detroit art museum. He rode the rails to Detroit for the purpose of meeting the artist. Upon arriving in Detroit, he asked train yard workers where the museum was, but none knew. When he found it, guards would not permit his entry but a woman came out as he sat on the front steps and said, "You look like you just lost your best friend." He explained his deep desire to meet the great artist, and as this woman was Frida Kahlo, she took him into the museum with her and introduced the two. Diego Rivera examined some of Pablo's artistry and allowed him to assist in the layering of Rivera's fresco mural still on view in the museum. Pablo lived with Diego Rivera and Frida Kahlo for some months while in Detroit. When the Spanish Civil War broke, partially out of loyalty to his Spanish mother, he went to fight – not knowing this would later be considered a crime by his own country because America had not yet "officially" named fascism a crime. He served in the American volunteer Abraham Lincoln Brigade during the Spanish Civil War.

Between his work with Rivera and his volunteer fighting in the Spanish Civil War, the curiosity of Pablo Picasso was aroused. When Davis was injured and recovering, Picasso came to visit and asked him to come stay with him. Soon after, U.S. government officials came to visit him as well, telling him upon his recovery he would be returned to U.S. soil to stand charges for "premature antifascism".

Davis claimed that he and the then House Unamerican Activities Committee lawyer Richard Nixon squared off in a shouting match when he was called to testify before the committee. Davis stated that he changed his name in the 1950s after being arrested for serving as president of the Communist Party in America, which was then perceived by some artists and intellectuals as a means to develop true equality. This can be verified in the Denver, Colorado, newspaper of the time, including a photograph of him sitting behind bars.

Born Paul Kleinbord, he attended high school in Philadelphia, along with Irvin Penn. (The two remained in contact until Penn's death.) After graduation he went on to attend art school for a period of time, also in Philadelphia. He married a second time and his wife gave birth to a son, his first wife having been, in his words, "a stunning beauty" but after marriage he discovered she was hermaphroditic. The first wife sought divorce for Pablo's sake. During the 1930s and early 1940s he was living in Philadelphia and didn't leave for any significant period of time. About 1945 he was sent to a sanatorium in Denver, CO because he had contracted tuberculosis. He remained in Denver until the early 1950s which is when he arrived in Detroit with his third wife. He lived in Ann Arbor for a period of time, then moved to Detroit. He continued to wear the wedding rings from his marriages on his ring finger.

== Artistic career ==
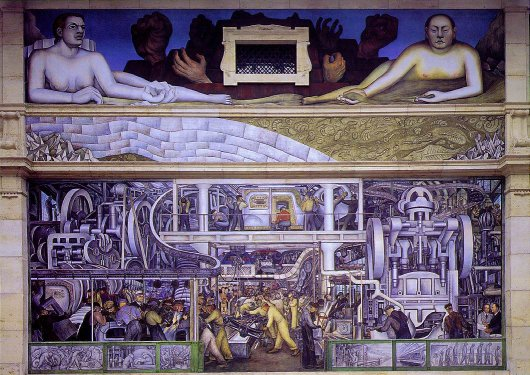
Detroit Industry, South Wall, 1932–33. Detroit Institute of Arts Davis is the last surviving artist who worked on this project.

Davis's work ranges from representational Post-Impressionism to highly abstract Expressionism. Much of Davis's art is influenced by the cubism of Pablo Picasso, whom he claimed to have studied under and worked with in Europe. His other major influence was Diego Rivera and the other Mexican muralists. Davis assisted Diego Rivera on the Detroit Industry mural panels in Rivera Court in the Detroit Institute of Arts. Davis said that he painted a "Dick Tracy"-like face on one of the figures when Rivera asked for a tough-looking figure. He also assisted Rivera on a mural painted inside the Ford Motor Company's Rouge Plant, in Dearborn, Michigan. Davis's painting of Michigan Governor John Swainson is hung in rotunda of the Michigan Capitol Building. He also painted commissioned portraits of celebrities including Katharine Hepburn and Marilyn Monroe. Davis is also known for his community mural projects in which he works with young people to produce large-scale co-operatively produced paintings. At least two of these murals can be found in Southwest Detroit.

Davis was a longtime member of Detroit's Scarab Club, a gallery and social venue for leading Detroit artists. His autograph is found on the club's ceiling beam along with the autographs of Diego Rivera, Norman Rockwell and John Sloan. Signing the ceiling beams is a Scarab Club tradition honoring distinguished guests and members.

== Community activism ==
Davis resided in Southwest Detroit, the heart of the city's barrio and the home to many enclave neighborhoods of great cultural and ethnic diversity. From the 1980s Davis was active in an ecumenical project seeking to unite this community around the development of senior housing and services for children, first through the community-based group Ecumenical Project SAVE and later Bridging Communities, Inc. This activism resulted in an 80-unit senior affordable housing project known as the "Pablo Davis Elder Living Center". Although an avowed communist and revolutionary, Davis asserted he was comfortable working with this mostly religious and Christian group.

== Later years ==
In 2005, Madonna University students Christina Warren and Adam Guth received a grant from the Michigan Campus Compact to make a film about Davis's role in Detroit Industry. The documentary, The Life and Art of Pablo Davis, was released in December 2006. They won an Emmy Award for Best College Student Documentary, presented by the Michigan Chapter of National Academy of Television Arts and Science at the Gem Theater in Detroit on June 16, 2007. From 2005 through 2007 Davis gained public attention by his participation as the oldest contributor to the annual Valentine's Day Dirty Show an art exhibit hosted by Bert's Warehouse Theater in Detroit's Eastern Market. The show features a wide variety of erotic art, ranging from pornographic to kinky to romantic. Davis frequently acted as a spokesperson for this event. Davis also frequently provided tours and lectures at the Detroit Institute of Arts concerning the Detroit Industry murals.

== External sources ==
- Pablo Davis's web site - Dead Link
- Bridging Communities listing
