= Camerons =

Camerons may refer to:

- Queen's Own Cameron Highlanders
- Camerons, a type of trouser worn by UK postwomen, named after the woman who pressed for their introduction
- Camerons Brewery
- Camerons, a suburb of Greymouth, New Zealand

== See also ==
- Cameron's (disambiguation)
