= Fellowship of American Bibliophilic Societies =

Association of American book clubs

The Fellowship of American Bibliophilic Societies
- Abbreviation: FABS
- Founder: eight American book clubs
- Type: Association (book collecting clubs)
- Purpose: Coordinate activities & publications among member clubs
- Chair: Gretchen Hause (Caxton Club)
- Vice-Chair: Sharon Gee (Book Club of California)
- Treasurer: Gretchen Hause (acting)
- Secretary: Paul Heyde (Northern Ohio Bibliophilic Society)
- Main organ: FABS Journal
- Website: www.fabsocieties.org

The Fellowship of American Bibliophilic Societies (FABS) is an association of American book clubs whose members seek interaction with book collectors across the country and around the world.

== History ==
At the Rowfant Club's 100th anniversary celebration in 1992, local members and their guests from book clubs in New York, Chicago, Philadelphia, and San Francisco discovered common interests in bibliophilic book clubs. The new association's first meeting was November 5, 1993, in New York, at The Grolier Club. In 1994, the group drew up articles of association outlining their goals to promote and develop common interests of the member societies.

Founding member book clubs were (in chronologic order of the year of the club's founding): the Grolier Club of New York City (1884); The Club of Odd Volumes, Boston (1886); The Rowfant Club, Cleveland (1892); the Philobiblon Club, Philadelphia (1893); The Caxton Club, Chicago (1895); The Book Club of California (1912); the Roxburghe Club of San Francisco (1927); and The Baxter Society, Portland, Maine (1984). The Club of Odd Volumes and The Rowfant Club are no longer member clubs.

== Select member clubs ==
Member clubs include The Aldus Society, Columbus, Ohio; The Ampersand Club, Minneapolis, Minnesota; The Baltimore Bibliophiles, Baltimore, Maryland; The Baxter Society; The Book Club of California, San Francisco, California; The Caxton Club, Chicago, Illinois; The Book Club of Detroit, Detroit, Michigan; The Grolier Club, New York, New York; The Manuscript Society; Movable Book Society; The Northern Ohio Bibliophilic Society, Cleveland, Ohio; The Philobiblon Club, Philadelphia, Pennsylvania; The Rowfant Club, Cleveland, Ohio; The Roxburghe Club of San Francisco; The Ticknor Society, Boston, Massachusetts; The Book Club of Washington, Seattle, Washington; and The Zamorano Club, Los Angeles, California.

== Select international affiliates ==
International affiliates include Aberystwyth Bibliographical Group, Aberystwyth, Wales; Nederlands Genootschap van Bibliofielen, Amsterdam; Associació de Bibliòfiles de Barcelona, Spain; National Union of Bibliophiles, Moscow; The Society of Bibliophiles in Cape Town, South Africa; Les Amis Du Livre Contemporain, Paris; The Private Libraries Association, Pinner, Middlesex, England; Pirckheimer-Gesellschaft, Berlin.

== Activities ==
The National Collegiate Book Collecting Contest, founded in 2005 by Fine Books & Collections Magazine, was led starting in 2010 by a partnership of the Antiquarian Booksellers' Association of America (ABAA), the Fellowship of American Bibliophilic Societies (FABS), the Grolier Club, and the Center for the Book and the Rare Books and Special Collections Division of the Library of Congress, with support by the Jay I. Kislak Foundation.

The contest encourages young book collectors. Similar contests have been held at colleges and universities across the United States, such as the Swarthmore College A. E. Newton Award Book Collecting Contest dating from the 1930s. Students from all schools, regardless of whether their school has a similar contest, and regardless of whether they have won similar contests, are encouraged to participate. The awards ceremony is held at the Library of Congress.

== See also ==
- Book collecting
- Books in the United States
