= Ellen G. K. Rubin =

American book collector

- Born: New York, United States
- Occupations: Author, collector, curator
- Spouse: Harold Rubin (m. 1966; died 2018)
- Children: 2
- Website: popuplady.com

Ellen G. K. Rubin is an American collector of pop-up and movable books known as the "Popuplady". She is best known for her collection of over 12,000 books, including more than 1,000 by the Czech paper engineer Vojtěch Kubašta, as well as for her lectures and research on the history of the pop-up and movable book formats.

== Early years ==
Rubin grew up in the Bronx, New York, and attended the Bronx High School of Science, The City College of New York, and Yale Medical School's Physician Associate Program.

== Collections ==
In the early 1980s, Rubin purchased two Random House pop-up books for her sons, and her fascination with the format led to a lifelong pursuit of pop-up and movable books. While attending the Yale School of Medicine in the 1980s to become a Physician Associate, a friend introduced her to book collecting, and after a visit to the 1988 exhibit "Eccentric Books" at Yale's Sterling Memorial Library, which featured an original copy of Petrus Apianus's Astronomicum Caesareum, Rubin's enthusiasm for pop-ups grew.

At first, Rubin's acquisitions focused on pop-up books related to children's classics and science and medicine, but quickly expanded to include any and all examples of clever pop-up mechanisms. By 2000, she had acquired around 4,000 books. As of 2018, her collection had grown to more than 9,000 books, along with thousands of pieces of pop-up and movable paper ephemera. Her collection encompasses at least 41 languages, including sign language, Icelandic, and braille, and many different materials, including a pop-up card made of elephant dung paper by book artist Edward H. Hutchins. The oldest book in her collection is a copy of [Regiomontanus]'s astronomy textbook, Kalendarium, from 1482.

Rubin's collection focuses especially on Czech pop-up book artist Vojtěch Kubašta. In 2014, she told The New York Times that after encountering his book, Moko and Koko in the Jungle, she decided she "decided that I would collect everything he ever did." She became acquainted with Kubašta's daughter, Dagmar Kubaštová Vrkljan, and contributed to a retrospective exhibition for his work in 2004. She has continued to collect and exhibit Kubašta's work, including a 2014 exhibit at The Grolier Club in New York City and a 2015 exhibit at the National Czech & Slovak Museum & Library in Cedar Rapids, Iowa. The Popuplady also staged another exhibit at the Grolier Club in 2022 entitled, Animated Advertising: 200 Years of Premiums, Promos, and Pop-ups. Ms. Rubin appeared on the TV program New York 1

Her library is visited by researchers around the world for the study of pop-up books, volvelles, flip-books, and other kinds of movable paper art both modern and historic. She became a charter member of the Movable Book Society in 1994, and shortly thereafter began writing articles about her collecting for the Society's newsletter, Movable Stationary.

Rubin runs a website, The Popuplady, that Rare Book Monthly called "[p]erhaps the most lively and useful of all the sites devoted to the subject".

== Publications ==
Books by or with contributions from Ellen G. K. Rubin
Title	Published	Publisher	OCLC	Notes
The Hanukkah puzzle book: a book in 8 parts ... for 8 days of fun.	2004	Pitspopany Press, New York	OCLC 71785509	The eight aspects of Hanukkah featured include lighting candles, finding oil, battles, the Temple, holiday presents, playing dreidel, laws of the King, and the Maccabees. Janet Zwebner, illustrator.
The Movable Book Society: A Celebration of Pop-up and Movable Books	2004	Movable Book Society, New Jersey	OCLC 56771276	10th Anniversary limited edition book with reproductions from selected historical creators of pop-up and movable books. Biographies of the original paper engineers were written by Robert Sabuda, Ann R. Montanaro, and Ellen G. K. Rubin.
Ideas in Motion: The History of Pop-Up and Movable Books: Books & Ephemera from the Collection of Ellen G. K. Rubin	2005	State University of New York, Mew Paltz	OCLC 60524750	Gallery Guide to the Ideas in Motion exhibit, April 2005, Sojourner Truth Library. 16 pages.
Pop-ups from Prague: A Centennial Celebration of the Graphic Artistry of Vojtěch Kubašta (1914-1992) from the Collection of Ellen G.K. Rubin.	2013	The Grolier Club, New York	OCLC 878124693	The 80-page catalog accompanied the exhibition held at the Grolier Club, New York City, January 23 - March 15, 2014.
The Meggendorfer Prize: A Historical Perspective (essay) in The Movable Book Society Meggendorfer Award: Celebrating Paper Engineers, Book Artists & Pop-Up Books 1998-2018	2019	The Movable Book Society, Chicago, IL	OCLC 1127650879	

== Selected exhibits and lectures ==
- "Brooklyn Pops Up! The History and Art of the Movable Book", co-curated with Ann Montanaro and Robert Sabuda at the Brooklyn Public Library in September 2000.
- "Pop-ups, Illustrated Books, and Graphic Designs of Czech Artist and Paper Engineer, Vojtěch Kubašta (1914-1992)", co-curated with Jim Findlay at the Bienes Center for the Literary Arts from January 16, 2004 to March 12, 2005.
- "A History of Pop-up and Movable Books: 700 Years of Paper Engineering", a lecture at the Carmichael Auditorium at the National Museum of American History on November 10, 2010.
- "Pop-Ups From Prague: A Centennial Celebration of the Graphic Artistry of Vojtěch Kubašta", an exhibit at the Grolier Club in New York City in 2014 and at the National Czech & Slovak Museum & Library in 2015.
