= The Book Club of Detroit =

Private club in Detroit, Michigan

The Book Club of Detroit (c. 1957)

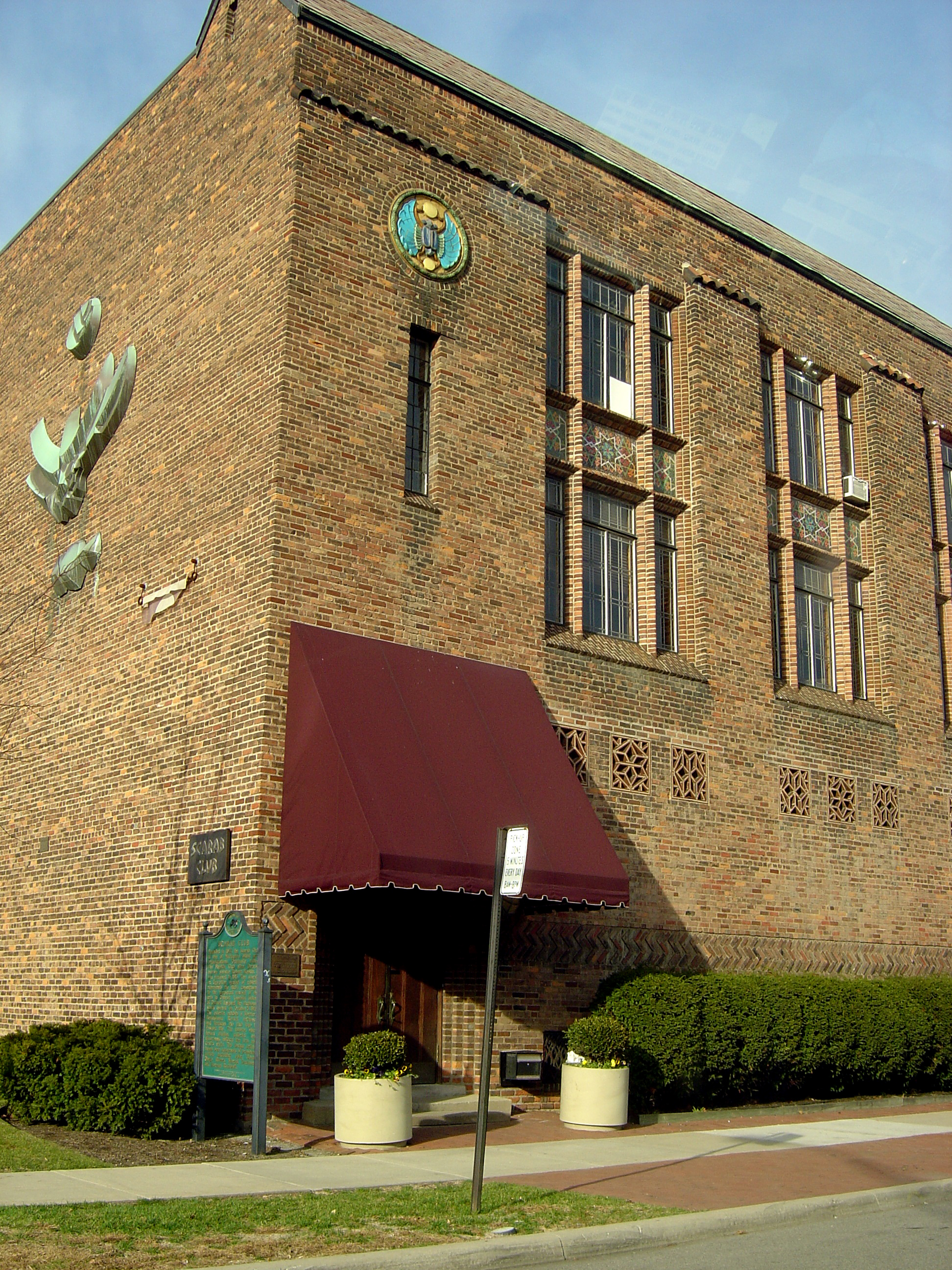
Detroit's historic Scarab Club, where Book Club meetings were held for many years.

The Book Club of Detroit is a private club and society of bibliophiles in downtown Detroit, Michigan.

== History ==
The Book Club of Detroit is club whose members are book collectors, book dealers and bibliophiles who meet in the interest not only of sociability, but to share and expand interest in the history of books and bookmaking.

The Club met regularly for many years at the historic Scarab Club in downtown Detroit.

The Club is also a member of the Fellowship of American Bibliophilic Societies (FABS).

== Supporters ==
The Book Club co-sponsors events with the Detroit Public Library.

== Past speakers ==
Some notable individuals who have given talks to the club are:

Frederick Gale Ruffner, Jr.

John K. King

== Past presidents ==
- 1958: Franklin G. Laucomer
- 1959: Benjamin R. Donaldson
- 1960: William A. Bostick
- 1961: C. E. Frazer Clark, Jr.
- 1962: Donald Weeks (biographer of the artist and writer Baron Corvo, was a founding member.)
- 1963 & 1983: James Babcock
- 1964: Roger Lindland
- 1965: Alfred H. Whittaker
- 1966: Seymour Kent
- 1967: Gloria Francis
- 1968: Robert Orr
- 1969: Richard Walker
- 1970: Evan Thompson
- 1971: John Neufeld
- 1972–1980: Robert Thomas
- 1981: Paula Jarvis
- 1982: Jean Coburn
- 1984–1985: Joann Chalat
- 1986: Frank Sladen
- 1987–1993: Annie Brewer
- 1994: James Beall
- 1995: Alice Nigoghosian
- 1996: Roy Pilot
- 1997: Sam Gatteno
- 1998: Harriet Larson
- 1999: Barry Neavill
- 2000: Shahida Nurullah
- 2001: James Deak
- 2002 & 2007–2008: Joan Knoertzer
- 2003: Joseph Ajlouny
- 2004: Jay Platt
- 2005: Janet Whitson
- 2006: Marguerite Humes Schwedler
- 2009–2010: C. Hedger Breed
- 2011–2013: Robert K. Jones
- 2014–[unknown]: Frank Castronova
- 2026: Marcia McBrien

== See also ==
- Detroit Athletic Club
- Grolier Club
- Detroit Club
- Books in the United States
