= Skiff (email service) =

Email service and collaboration suite

- Website type: Webmail
- Owner: Notion
- Creators: Andrew Milich; Jason Ginsberg
- Parent: Notion
- Website: skiff.com
- Commercial: Yes
- Registration: No longer accepted
- Users: ≈2 million users (November 2023)
- Launched: 2022; 4 years ago
- Current status: Inactive, defunct as of February 9, 2024
- Content license: CC BY-NC-SA 4.0 (mainly)

Skiff was an email service startup company and collaboration tool, that provided privacy-friendly end-to-end encrypted Email and Cloud services. The company's commercial strategy was focused in offering to its clients a Source-Available or Open-Source, transparent and audited Email, Calendar, and Cloud Storage services without trackers or advertisements.

Skiff launched in 2021 and was developed in San Francisco, California. In November 2023, 17 months after launch, it reached almost 2 million users.

Skiff was acquired by Notion on 9 February 2024. Users had six months to migrate their data before the closure of the services. The service mostly shut down on 9 August 2024 with email forwarding remaining active until 9 February 2025.

== History ==
Skiff was founded by Andrew Milich and Jason Ginsberg in 2020 and was initially focused on providing a secure document editing service similar to Google Docs. While Skiff was in beta, the founders released a public whitepaper explaining how Skiff's encryption works. Skiff had its public launch out of beta in November 2021. A difference from other services was that it stored its files using the InterPlanetary File System (IPFS).

Skiff Mail and Skiff Drive were launched in 2022.

In February 2024, Notion acquired Skiff and disabled registration. All user data was deleted 6 months after the purchase date, and emails sent to @skiff.com emails continued to forward to another inbox until February 9 of 2025.

== Software ==
Some of Skiff's code is source-available with some libraries being open source. Skiff used public-key authenticated encryption for secure and private access to end-to-end encrypted documents, files and emails. Skiff also allowed users to send payments through MetaMask.

== Reviews ==
In a 2023 article, PCMAG reviewed Skiff pointing that Skiff offers "End-to-end encryption for email, collaboration, and calendar", making complements to the fact of its services being free and easy to use (while being available as Apps for macOS, Android, and iOS). Moreover, it also was pointed the "cons" of Skiff services "requiring four separate mobile apps" and having "no encrypted email with nonusers". However, Skiff notably added PGP encryption support in December 2023.

PCMAG's final score review was "4.5/5 Outstanding".

== Controversies ==
According with a WSJ article published in 2023, allegedly the Russian government banned Skiff from Russia, because of Skiff's end-to-end encryption business model, which is illegal in Russia. (And also due to the company's persistence in not handing over users data for the Russian Government, thus allegedly compromising the safety of its citizens). As a result, Skiff faced an 81% drop in traffic from Russia, and Andrew Milich itself stated that Skiff's engineers were scrambling to find ways to restore access to Russian users after the occurrence.
