= Wolfgang Menzel =

German poet (1798–1873)

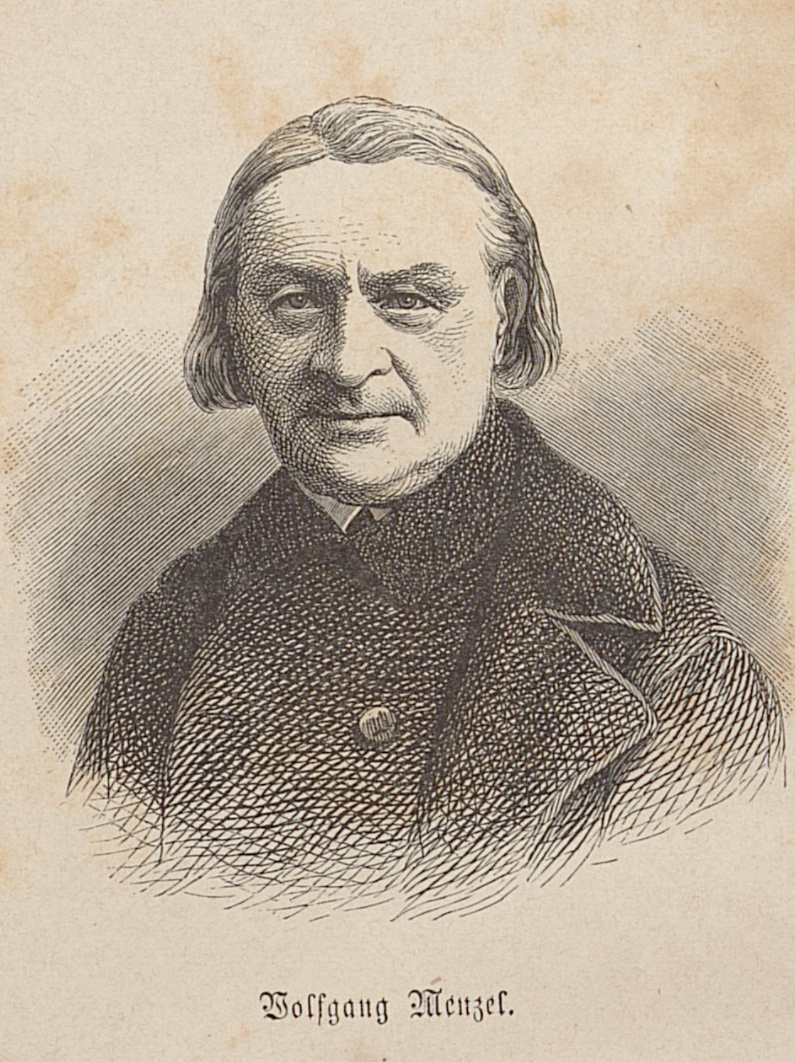
- Wolfgang Menzel
- Born: June 21, 1798; Waldenburg, Prussian Silesia
- Died: April 23, 1873 (aged 74); Stuttgart, Kingdom of Württemberg
- Occupations: Poet, critic, literary historian
- Years active: 1823–1873
- Notable work: histories of the German War of 1866 and Franco-German War of 1870–71

Wolfgang Menzel (21 June 1798 – 23 April 1873) was a German poet, critic and literary historian, who was born in Waldenburg (Wałbrzych) in Prussian Silesia.

== Career overview ==
He studied at the Breslau, Jena, and Bonn, and after living for some time in Aarau and Heidelberg finally settled in Stuttgart, where, from 1830 to 1838, he had a seat in the Württemberg Diet.

His first work, a clever and original volume of poems, entitled Streckverse (Heidelberg, 1823), was followed in 1824-1825 by a popular Geschichte der Deutschen in three volumes and in 1829 and 1830 by Rubezahl and Narcissus, the dramatized fairy-stories upon which his reputation as a poet chiefly rests. In 1851 he published the romance of Furore, a lively picture of the period of the Thirty Years' War; his other writings include Geschichte Europas, 1789-1815 (2 vols. Stuttgart, 1853), and histories of the German War of 1866 and of the Franco-German War of 1870-71.

From 1826 to 1848 Menzel edited a Literaturblatt in connection with the Morgenblatt; in the latter year he transferred his allegiance from the Liberal to the Conservative party, and in 1852 his Literaturblatt was revived in that interest. In 1866, his political sympathies shifted once again, and he opposed the particularism of the Prussian Junkers and the anti-unionism of southern Germany. He died on 23 April 1873 in Stuttgart. His library of 18,000 volumes was afterwards acquired for the University of Strassburg.

Menzel was a strident opponent of innovation in poetry and in particular of Heinrich Heine.

== Works ==
- German Literature, Vol. 2, Vol. 3. Boston: Hilliard, Gray and Company, 1840.
- “Nationality and Cosmopolitsm,” The American Eclectic, No. 3, Art. IV, January 1842.
- The History of Germany: From the Earliest Period to 1842, Vol. 2, Vol. 3. London: Henry G. Bohn, 1852.
