= Harrison Horblit =

American philanthropist and collector

Harrison David Horblit (1 May 1912, in Boston – 8 March 1988, in Danbury) was a philanthropist and collector of books, manuscripts, and photographs. He is famous for the Harrison D. Horblit Collection of Early Photographs.

Horblit graduated from Harvard University in 1933, then graduated from Harvard Business School and became an executive in textile manufacture. For about 30 years he was president of Colonial Fabrics, a Manhattan company, which closed in 1966 when he retired. In the 1960s Horblit purchased the entire photography collection of Thomas Phillipps and added to it for about 20 years. Horblit's wife Jean (née Mermin) donated most of this collection to Harvard's Houghton Library in 1995. From March 10 to May 26, 1999, after three years of cataloguing, re-housing and conserving the collection, Houghton Library exhibited the collection to the public, along with a two-day symposium on the 10th and 11 March. According to the Harvard Gazette, "This premier collection of more than 7,000 items —including daguerreotypes, photographic prints, books illustrated with original photographs, early photographic albums, cameras, and manuscripts— documents the discovery of photography from the 1830s through the turn of the century." Horblit was a collector of rare books related to the history of science, navigation and mathematics. In 1964 the Grolier Club published his book One hundred books famous in science: based on an exhibition at the Grolier Club.

About 1964 Horblit designed a "Bibliographical Collation Computer", a 128 x 245 mm card in a plastic sleeve which operates much like a multiplication table in which the letters of the alphabet are correlated with the pagination values of formats of 1, 2, 4, 6, 8, 10,12, 16, 20, 24, and 32 leaves. The card was copyrighted in 1964 and copies were sold by the Grolier Club.

In 1965 the Horblits purchased the Wagoner mansion in Ridgefield, Connecticut. For many years Harrison and Jean Horblit spent two months each summer yachting along the Maine coast. Harrison Horblit was survived by his wife, two children and two grandchildren. Jean Horblit died at the age of 98.
