= Bookworm =

Lover of books

External videos
- Booknotes interview with Nicholas Basbanes on A Gentle Madness, October 15, 1995, C-SPAN

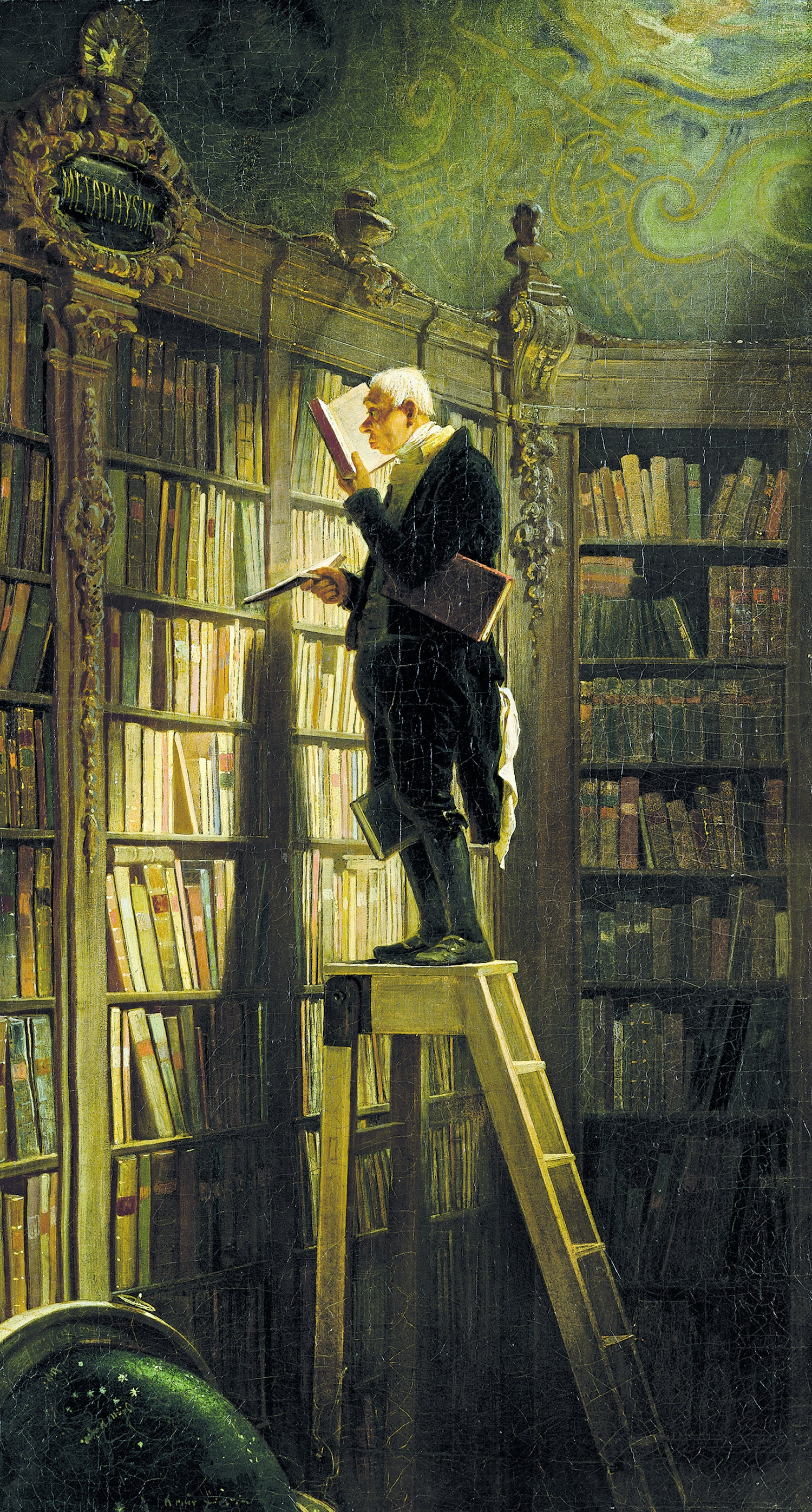
The Bookworm, 1850, by Carl Spitzweg

A bookworm or bibliophile is an individual who loves and frequently reads or collects books. Bibliophilia or bibliophilism is the love of books.

Bibliophiles may have large, specialized book collections. They may highly value old editions, autographed copies, or illustrated versions. Bibliophilia is distinct from bibliomania, a compulsive obsession to collect books which can affect interpersonal relationships or health. The term "bibliophile" has been in use since 1820 and has been associated with historical figures like Lord Spencer and J.P. Morgan, who were known for their extensive book collections.

== Profile ==
The classic bibliophile loves to read, admires and collects books, and often amasses a large and specialized collection. Bibliophiles usually possess books they love or that hold special value, as well as old editions with unusual bindings, autographed, or illustrated copies. "Bibliophile" is an appropriate term for a minority of those who are book collectors.

Literally, a book "worm" is an insect larva that eats books. The term "bookworm" is often used as a metaphor to describe a voracious reader, an indiscriminate reader, or a bibliophile. In its earliest iterations, it had a negative connotation—that is, it denoted an idler who read rather than worked. Over the years its meaning has drifted in a more positive direction. Another meaning of the word is "a person who pays more attention to formal rules and book learning than they merit."

== History ==
According to Arthur H. Minters, the "private collecting of books was a fashion indulged in by many Romans, including Cicero and Atticus". The term bibliophile entered the English language in 1820. A bibliophile is to be distinguished from the much older notion of a bookman (which dates back to 1583), who is one who loves books, and especially reading; more generally, a bookman is one who participates in writing, publishing, or selling books.

Lord Spencer and the Marquess of Blandford were noted bibliophiles. "The Roxburghe sale quickly became a foundational myth for the burgeoning secondhand book trade, and remains so to this day"; this sale is memorable due to the competition between "Lord Spencer and the marquis of Blandford [which] drove [the price of a probable first edition of Boccaccio's Decameron up to the astonishing and unprecedented sum of £2,260". J. P. Morgan was also a noted bibliophile. In 1884, he paid $24,750 ($772,130.92, adjusted for inflation for 2021) for a 1459 edition of the Mainz Psalter.

== See also ==
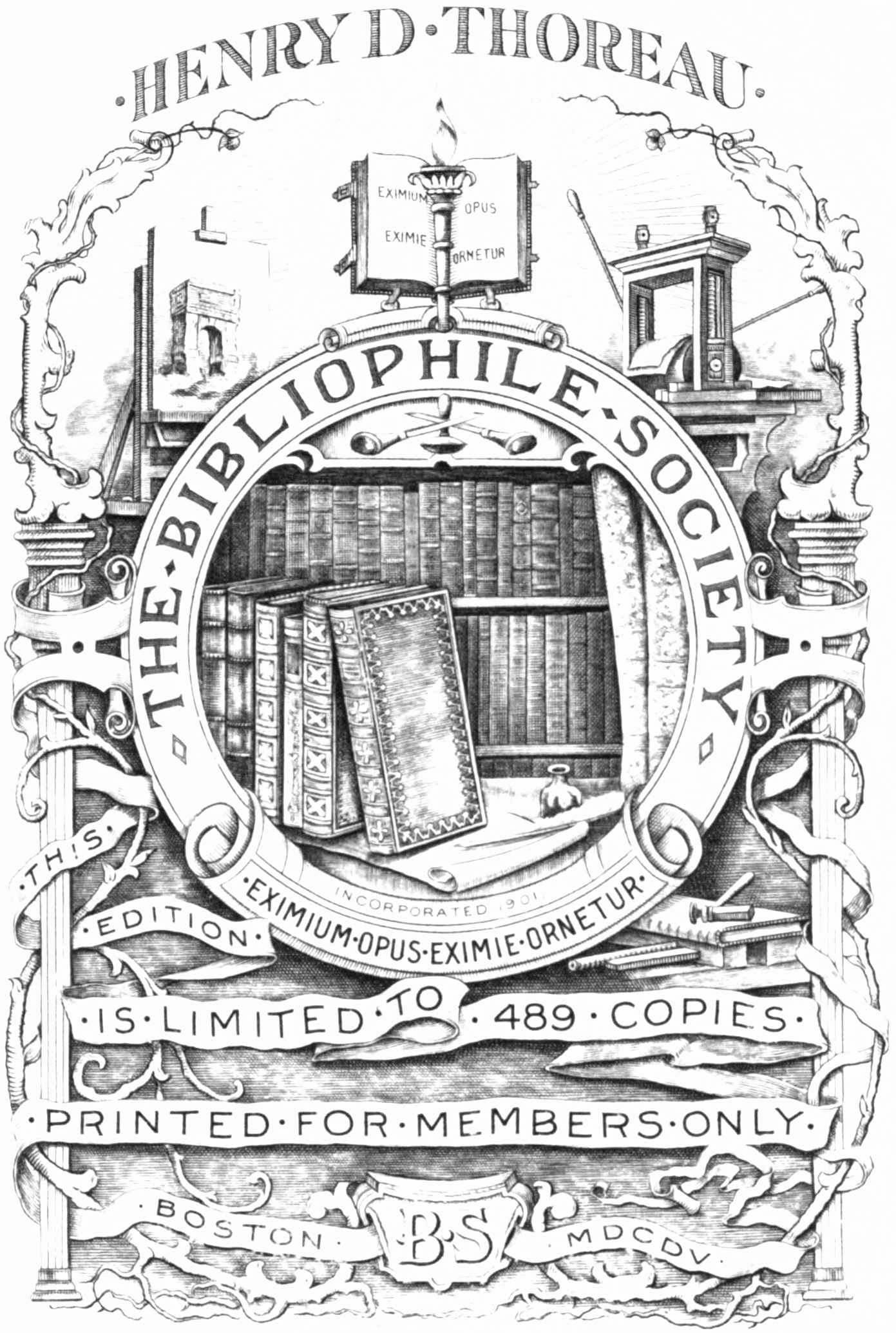
The Bibliophile Society of Boston art from a limited edition book by Henry David Thoreau

- Book collecting
- Bibliophobia
- Oxford University Society of Bibliophiles, UK
- United States:
  - Fellowship of American Bibliophilic Societies
  - Antiquarian book trade in the United States
  - The Book Club of Detroit
  - Caxton Club, Chicago
  - The Club of Odd Volumes, Boston
  - Grolier Club, New York
  - Bibliophile mailing list

Similar terms

- Audiophilia
- Cinephilia
- Comicphilia
- Infophilia
- Telephilia
- Videophilia
