= Frederick Skiff =

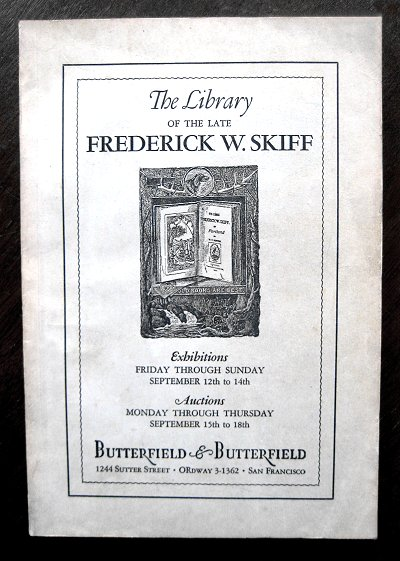
Auction catalog from the dispersal of Skiff's library in 1947.)

Frederick Woodward Skiff (1867–1947), was an author, noted collector, bibliophile, expert on Americana, and founder of the Acorn Club.

Skiff traveled widely throughout the United States during his adult life, but is most associated with Connecticut and Portland, Oregon. In 1899, he founded the Acorn Club in Hartford, Connecticut, a membership organization of Connecticut historians which publishes fine press-work specialty books on American historical subjects.

Skiff wrote two books—Adventures in Americana: Recollections of Forty Years Collecting Books, Furniture, China, Guns and Glass (1935, Metropolitan Press, Portland, Oregon) and Landmarks and literature: An American Travelogue (1937, ibid).

Over the course of his life, Skiff amassed one of the most important private libraries in the United States, with particular emphases on literature and history. After his death in 1947, the library's contents were sold at auction by Butterfield & Butterfield (now Bonham's) in San Francisco. Many of the books made their ways into other important collections. Countess Doheny purchased 800 books from Skiff's library, becoming part of the Estelle Doheny Collection of American Literature, which was in turn auctioned off by Christie's New York in 2001.
