= Discorsi =

Discorsi, an Italian word meaning "discourses", may refer to:

- Discourses on Livy (Discorsi sopra la prima deca di Tito Livio), a book by Machiavelli
- Discourses and Mathematical Demonstrations Relating to Two New Sciences, a book by Galileo
- I discorsi, an album by the Mina
