= Text =

Text may refer to:

== Written word ==
- Text (literary theory), any object that can be read, including:
  - Religious text, a writing that a religious tradition considers to be sacred
  - Text, a verse or passage from scripture used in expository preaching
  - Textbook, a book of instruction in any branch of study

== Computing and telecommunications ==
- Plain text, unformatted text
- Text file, a type of computer file opened by most text software
- Text string, a sequence of characters manipulated by software
- Text message, a short electronic message designed for communication between mobile phone users
- tEXt, an ancillary chunk in the PNG image file format
- Text, the former name of Apple's Messages instant messenger
- Text (company), an AI and customer service software company
- Texts (software), now Beeper (application), a chat app for several messaging services

== Arts and media ==
- TEXT, a Swedish band
- Text & Talk (formerly Text), an academic journal
- "Text", a 2010 bonus track by Mann featuring Jason Derulo from Mann's World, 2010
- TxT (film), a 2006 Filipino horror film
- Text (film), a 2019 Russian film
- "Text" (Not Going Out), a 2022 television episode

== See also ==
- Copy (written), written material in publications
- Discourse (disambiguation)
- Enriched text, formatted text format for e-mail
- Formatted text, digital text which has styling information beyond minimal semantic elements
- Rich Text Format, a proprietary document file format by Microsoft
- SMS (Short Message Service), the "texting" function of mobile phones
  - Rich Communication Services (RCS), the modern successor to SMS
- Tex (disambiguation)
- TeX, typesetting software
- Text display, electronic alphanumeric display device
- Text mode, computer display mode based on characters
- Text segment, the portion of computer file containing executable instructions
- Writing, representation of language in a textual medium
