= Cameron's Books and Magazines =

Defunct bookstore in Portland, Oregon, U.S.

Coordinates: 45.52030°N 122.67415°W

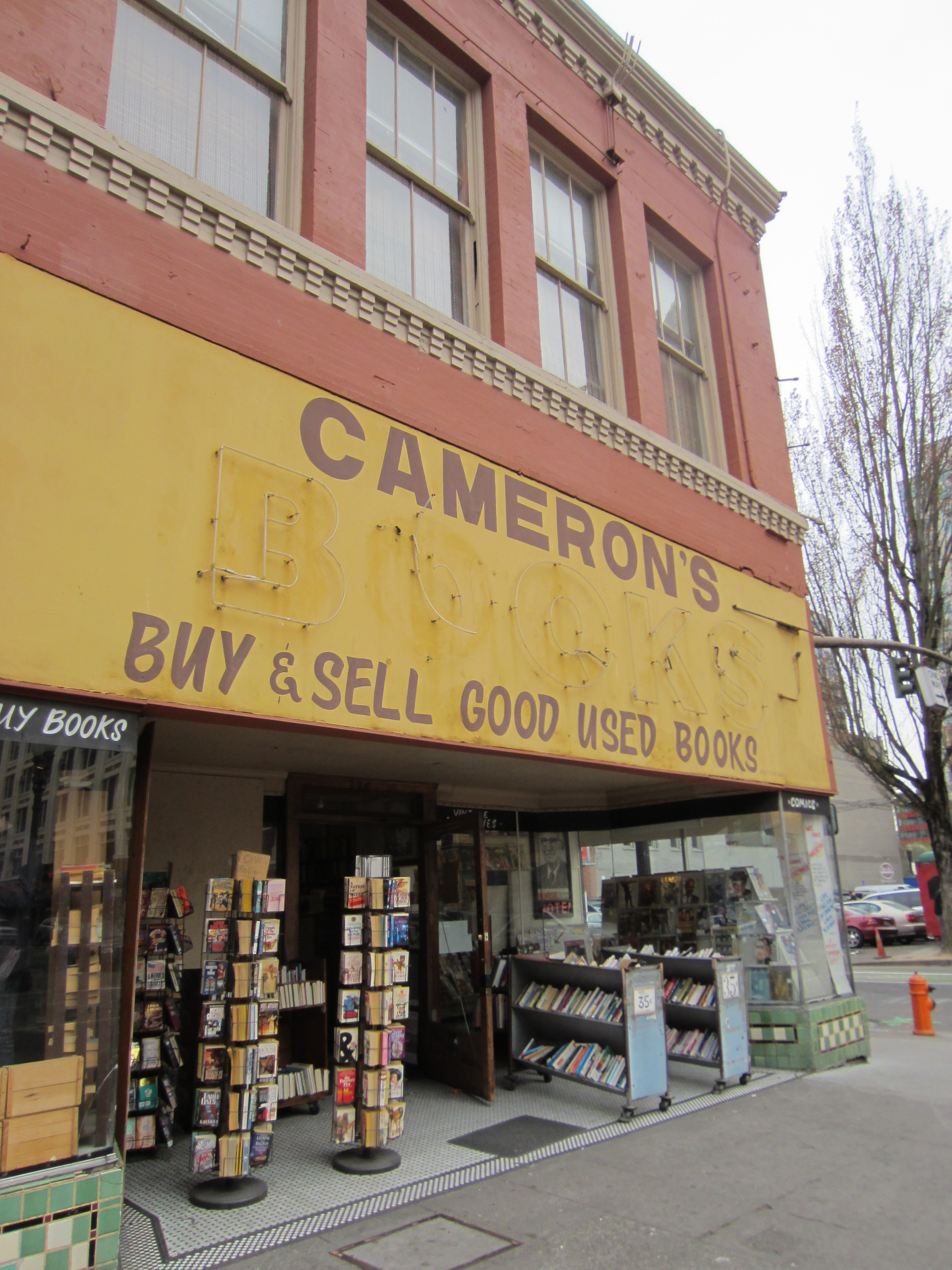
- The shop's exterior in 2013
- Founded: 1938
- Defunct: 2021
- Headquarters: 336 Southwest 3rd Avenue, Portland, Oregon, United States
- Website: cameronsbooksandmagazines.wordpress.com

Cameron's Books and Magazines, or simply Cameron's, was Portland, Oregon's oldest used bookstore and one of the largest vintage magazine dealers in the United States.

== History ==
The business opened in 1938.

Originally slated to close in November 2019, owner Crystal Zingsheim announced in April 2021 that the store was closing for good on April 24, 2021. The final day of business was April 24, 2021, as planned.

The Portland government intervened to prevent eviction of Zingsheim from the venue, which would have led to the loss of remaining unsold stock. With assistance from the local government and several local organizations, remaining stock of books and periodicals were relocated to the upper floors of the Portland Union Station, where Zingsheim set up a non-profit organization dedicated to distribution of materials to schools. The material has also provided period style and content for historical accuracy in portraying the past.
