= Association copy =

An association copy is a copy of a book which once belonged to the author or someone connected with the author. It can also apply to a copy that once belonged to someone particularly associated with its contents. An association copy is often also a presentation copy, in which the author gives the book to a friend, colleague, notable person, or someone upon whom a character in the book is thought or known to have been based.

Association copies are highly collectable.

An example of an association copy is Herman Melville's copy of The Narrative of the Most Extraordinary and Distressing Shipwreck of the Whaleship Essex of Nantucket that contains 18 pages of Melville's notes.
