= Bill Kartalopoulos =

American comics critic (born 1975)

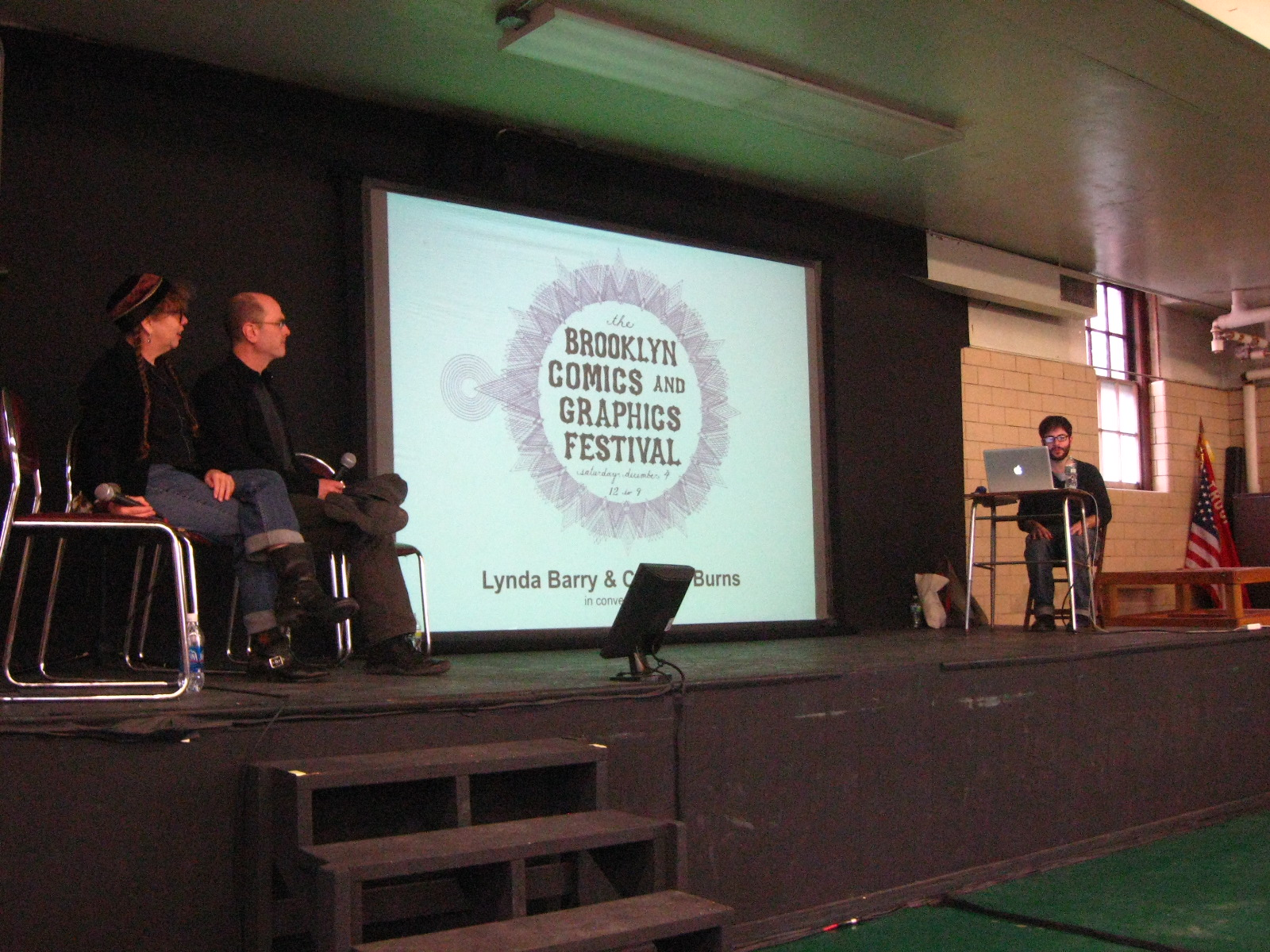
- Kartalopoulos (r) with Lynda Barry and Charles Burns at the 2010 Brooklyn Comics and Graphics Festival
- Born: March 26, 1975 (age 51)
- Education: Dartmouth College; The New School
- Occupations: Comics editor; Event organizer; Educator
- Website: on-panel.com

Bill Kartalopoulos is a New York-based comics critic, educator, curator and editor. From 2014 to 2019 he was the Series Editor for the Best American Comics series of annual comics anthologies published by Houghton Mifflin Harcourt. He was a co-founder of the Brooklyn Comics and Graphics Festival and has also directed programming for the Small Press Expo and the MoCCA Festival. He teaches courses about comics at Parsons School of Design and the School of Visual Arts.

== Background ==
Kartalopoulos graduated from Dartmouth College, where he co-founded the student comics anthology Vox Pop Comix. In 2002, he launched a comics newsblog called EGON and from 2004 to 2005 served as the editor of Indy Magazine, an online magazine about comics. Features for that publication included an extensive two-part history of RAW Magazine for which Kartalopoulos conducted interviews with Françoise Mouly, Charles Burns, Kim Deitch, Gary Panter, Art Spiegelman, Chris Ware, and others. Comics journalist Tom Spurgeon wrote that "Kartalopoulos engineered both this decade's best on-line, magazine-style effort about comics (Indy Magazine), and its most useful support web site (EGON)." In 2005 Indy Magazine was nominated for both the Harvey Award and the Eisner Award. Subsequently, he worked for several years as Spiegelman's studio assistant. In 2013 he completed a master's degree in media studies at The New School.

== Comics festivals ==
Kartalopoulos has worked extensively organizing comics festivals, with emphases on programming and international guests. In 2006 he began working as programming coordinator for the Small Press Expo and continued in that role through 2014. In 2006, comics journalist Heidi MacDonald wrote: "Bill Kartalopoulos did the programming... and he definitely elevated it to the level that a serious festival of intelligent comics needed." In 2009, he co-founded the Brooklyn Comics and Graphics Festival (BCGF) with Desert Island owner Gabe Fowler and PictureBox publisher Dan Nadel. For the 2012 edition of the BCGF, Kartalopoulos conducted a conversation with Richard McGuire, Spiegelman, and Ware at the Knitting Factory and organized international programming featuring guests from France, Belgium, Finland, Mexico and Croatia. The BCGF concluded as an ongoing project in 2013. Since 2014, Kartalopoulos has been the Programming Director for the MoCCA Festival, organized annually in Manhattan by the Society of Illustrators. Kartalopoulos has continued to feature international artists at this event, including Dutch artist Joost Swarte, Belgian artist Brecht Vandenbroucke, and French artists including Yvan Alagbé, Marion Fayolle, Annie Goetzinger, Florent Ruppert, and others.

== Editing and publishing ==
From 2014 to 2019 Kartalopoulos was the Series Editor for the Best American Comics series published annually by Houghton Mifflin Harcourt. In that role, he collaborated each year with a selected Guest Editor:

- 2014: Scott McCloud
- 2015: Jonathan Lethem
- 2016: Roz Chast
- 2017: Ben Katchor
- 2018: Phoebe Gloeckner
- 2019: Jillian Tamaki

The Best American Comics series appeared regularly on the New York Times Hardcover Graphic Books list during Kartalopoulos's tenure, with the 2016 edition entering the list at #1. In September 2020, Kartalopoulos announced that the series was one of several "Best American" titles that had been cancelled by Houghton Mifflin Harcourt. These cancellations came as part of several waves of cutbacks prior to the publisher's eventual sale to HarperCollins.

In addition to his tenure editing Best American Comics, Kartalopoulos has also edited a number of other book and periodical projects. Kartalopoulos edited and published a 2013 English-language edition of Florent Ruppert and Jérôme Mulot's 2006 graphic novel Panier de singe, which won the Prix Révélation at the Angoulême International Comics Festival. Kartalopoulos published the book in North America as Barrel of Monkeys under his own Rebus Books imprint, operating out of a live/work space in Williamsburg, Brooklyn called "Cartoon House" for its high concentration of comics artists and professionals. Critic Daniel Levin Becker named Barrel of Monkeys his top book of the year for Salon.com, calling the book "so blackly funny, so morbid and joyously awful, that it would be completely appalling if it weren't carried off just right." Slate books editor Dan Kois named the book among his top 15 books of the year.

In 2016, he edited and designed After Nothing Comes, a collection of formative zines by Aidan Koch, for Koyama Press. Artforum called the book "an exciting break from the traditional graphic-novel medium. Writing for Thrillist, critic Sean T. Collins named the book among the "33 Greatest Graphic Novels of All Time."

Kartalopoulos guest-edited the March 2016 issue of World Literature Today, focusing on international comics. He also guest-edited the February–March 2015 comics-themed issue of the American Book Review, featuring contributions from Austin English, John Hankiewicz, Nicole Rudick, Dash Shaw, and others.

Kartalopoulos additionally served as Associate Editor for Multimedia on Art Spiegelman's 2012 book MetaMaus, which included a DVD with video, audio, photos, and an interactive version of Maus. He also worked as a production and editorial assistant for the first two seasons of Françoise Mouly's TOON Books imprint of comics for early readers.

== Curatorial work ==
Kartalopoulos has curated a number of comics-related exhibits in the US and internationally, showing work by artists including Lynda Barry, Alexis Beauclair, Kim Deitch, Aidan Koch, Javier Mariscal, Richard McGuire, Son Ni, Paper Rad, Raymond Pettibon, Deb Sokolow, Saul Steinberg, Chris Ware, and others. Curated exhibitions include:

- Cartoon Polymaths at the Sheila C. Johnson Design Center, Parsons School of Design (New York, NY, 2011)
- Ruppert and Mulot 101 at Wayfarers (Brooklyn, NY, 2012)
- Uncanny Valleys at Soloway Gallery (Brooklyn, NY, 2012)
- Kim Deitch, « le secret le mieux gardé de la bande dessinée américaine » at Mains d'Oeuvres (Saint-Ouen, France, 2013)
- The Best American Comics: Selections 2014–2017 at the South Bend Museum of Art (South Bend, IN, 2017)
- REBUS at Kali Gallery (Fumetto Festival, Luzern, Switzerland, 2019)

== Other work ==
Kartalopoulos teaches undergraduate courses about comics at Parsons. He also teaches in the MFA Visual Narrative program at the School of Visual Arts.

Kartalopoulos has written about comics for venues including The Paris Review, The Huffington Post, and The Brooklyn Rail. He has contributed essays to books including The Search for Smilin' Ed by Kim Deitch; Vanishing Perspective by Alexis Beauclair; and Society is Nix! edited by Peter Maresca.

Kartalopoulos is a frequent public speaker about comics. Two of his public discussions, on the subject of comics and post-war avant-garde art, were delivered as part of Ben Katchor's New York Comics and Picture-Story Symposium and are archived online.

Kartalopoulos has been working on a book about comics to be published by Princeton University Press in 2024.
