= Raw Books =

American publishing company

- Founded: 1978; 48 years ago
- Founder: Françoise Mouly; Art Spiegelman
- Country of origin: United States
- Headquarters location: New York City
- Publication types: Graphic novels, Comic books
- Imprints: Raw One-Shots; Raw Junior; Little Lit; Toon Books

Raw Books & Graphics is an American publishing company specializing in comics and graphic novels. Operating since 1978, it is owned and operated by Françoise Mouly. The company first came to prominence publishing Raw magazine, co-edited by Mouly and her husband, cartoonist Art Spiegelman. In the 1980s the company published graphic novels, and with the formation of Raw Junior in 1999, branched into children's comics with Little Lit and Toon Books.

== History ==
=== Origins ===
In 1978 Mouly founded Raw Books and Graphics, a name settled on in part because of its small-operation feel, and part because it was reminiscent of Mad magazine. Mouly worked from an aesthetic inspired in part by the Russian Constructivists, who brought a design sense to everyday objects. Raw Books began by publishing postcards and prints by artists such as underground cartoonist Bill Griffith and Dutch cartoonist Joost Swarte. More ambitious projects included art objects such as the Zippy-Scope, a cardboard device with to watch a comic strip rolled up on a film spool, featuring Griffth's character Zippy the Pinhead. Some projects were more commercial, such as the annual Streets of SoHo Map and Guide, whose advertising revenue financed much of Raw Books.

=== Raw ===
Having in this way honed her publishing skills, Mouly's ambition turned to magazine publication with Raw. In the midst of a commercial and artistic fallow period in the American comics industry, the lavishly printed, 10 1/2 in × 14 1/8 in (27 cm × 36 cm) first issue of Raw appeared in July 1980. The best-known work to run in Raw was a serialization of Spiegelman's graphic novel Maus, which ran as an insert for the duration of the magazine from the December 1980 second issue.

Raw had a strong critical reception, and also sold surprisingly well. Raw Books published six One Shot books from 1981 to 1986 by cartoonists such as Gary Panter, Sue Coe, and Jerry Moriarty. Mouly brought a similar production sensibility to these books to what she brought to Raw: the cover to Panter's Jimbo was corrugated cardboard pasted with stickers of the book's main character.

By the end of the decade, Pantheon Books had begun co-publishing Raw Books' output, and Penguin Books had picked up publishing of Raw itself.

In 1991, Mouly and Spiegelman published the final issue of Raw, which was no longer a small, hands-on operation, nor was it something they still thought necessary, as the artists then had a range of publishing outlets that had not existed when Raw first saw the light of day.

=== Little Lit ===
Mouly founded Raw Junior 1999 and the company's next ongoing project was Little Lit, a comic book anthology series created expressly for children, authored by major cartoonists and literary figures. Contributors include writers such as Paul Auster, Neil Gaiman, and David Sedaris; cartoonists such as Daniel Clowes, Tony Millionaire, and Chris Ware; and children's writers such as William Joyce, Barbara McClintock and Lemony Snicket (Daniel Handler).

Little Lit series began publication in 2000 with the 64-page hardcover book, Little Lit: Folklore & Fairy Tale Funnies. This was followed by two subsequent volumes, Strange Stories for Strange Kids (2001), and It Was a Dark and Silly Night..., published in 2003.

=== Toon Books ===
In 2008, the children's comics publisher Toon Books debuted with eight hardcover early reader titles. Featuring such creators as Geoffrey Hayes, Jay Lynch, Dean Haspiel, Eleanor Davis, and Spiegelman, Toon Books claimed to provide "the first high-quality comics designed for children ages four and up".

Upon Toon's debut, Publishers Weekly characterized the line as having the potential to revitalize the field of comics for kids: "Françoise Mouly is at it again. After transforming American comics with the seminal 1980s comics anthology RAW, Mouly is now out to teach kids to read by using comics".

When it first launched, Toon Books was distributed by Diamond Books, a unit of Diamond Comic Distributors dedicated to getting comics and graphic novels into the book trade. In 2010, Toon Books entered into a distribution partnership with Candlewick Press. In late summer/early fall of 2014, Toon Books launched the new line TOON Graphics, an imprint for readers 8 and up. It is distributed by Consortium, a unit of Perseus, a move that reflects Toon's true status as a small but expanding independent publisher.

== Titles published ==
=== Raw Books ===
- Manhattan by Mark Beyer (1978)
- Streets of SoHo Map and Guide (1978–c. 1982)
- Work and Turn (1979)
- Raw magazine (8 issues, July 1980–1986)
- Agony by Mark Beyer (1987; co-published with Pantheon Books) ISBN 978-0394754420
- Hard-Boiled Defective Stories by Charles Burns (1988; co-published with Pantheon Books) ISBN 978-0394754413
- Jimbo: Adventures in Paradise by Gary Panter (1988; co-published with Pantheon Books) ISBN 978-0-394-75639-4
- Cheap Novelties: The Pleasures of Urban Decay by Ben Katchor (1991; co-published with Penguin Books) ISBN 978-0140159974
- The Narrative Corpse, edited by Art Spiegelman (1995; co-published with Gates of Heck)
- Resist! #2 (2017)

==== Raw one-shots ====
1. Jimbo by Gary Panter (1981)
2. How to Commit Suicide in South Africa by Holly Metz and Sue Coe (1982)
3. Jack Survives by Jerry Moriarty (1984)
4. Invasion of the Elvis Zombies by Gary Panter (1984)
5. Big Baby: Curse of the Molemen by Charles Burns (1985)
6. X by Sue Coe (1986)

=== Raw Junior ===
==== Little Lit ====
- Little Lit: Folklore & Fairy Tale Funnies (2000)
- Strange Stories for Strange Kids (2001)
- It Was a Dark and Silly Night... (2003)

==== Toon Books ====
- Toon Books bibliography
