= Eisner Award for Best Publication for Early Readers =

Annual literary award

- Awarded for: Best Publication for Early Readers
- Country: United States
- First award: 2012
- Most recent winner: All the Hulk Feels, by Dan Santat
- Website: www.comic-con.org/awards/eisner-awards-current-info

The Eisner Award for Best Publication for Early Readers is an award for "creative achievement" in American comic books for early readers.

== Name change ==
From 2012 to 2015 the award was appended with "up to age 7" and from 2016 to 2019 it was appended with "up to age 8". For the 2020 awards the age designation was dropped.

== Winners and nominees ==
| Year | Title | Authors | Publisher | Result | Ref. |
|---|---|---|---|---|---|
| 2012 | Dragon Puncher Island | James Kochalka | Top Shelf Productions | Winner | |
| 2012 | Beauty and the Squat Bears | Émile Bravo | Yen Press | Nominee | |
| 2012 | Benjamin Bear in Fuzzy Thinking | Philippe Coudray | Candlewick Press/Toon Books | Nominee | |
| 2012 | Nursery Rhyme Comics | Chris Duffy (ed) | First Second Books | Nominee | |
| 2012 | Patrick in a Teddy Bear's Picnic | Geoffrey Hayes | Candlewick Press/Toon Books | Nominee | |
| 2013 | Babymouse for President | Jennifer L. Holm and Matthew Holm | Random House | Winner | |
| 2013 | Benny and Penny in Lights Out | Geoffrey Hayes | Candlewick Press/Toon Books | Nominee | |
| 2013 | Kitty & Dino | Sara Richard | Yen Press/Hachette Book Group | Nominee | |
| 2013 | Maya Makes a Mess | Rutu Modan | Candlewick Press/Toon Books | Nominee | |
| 2013 | Zig and Wikki in The Cow | Nadja Spiegelman and Trade Loeffler | Candlewick Press/Toon Books | Nominee | |
| 2014 | Itty Bitty Hellboy | Art Baltazar and Franco | Dark Horse Comics | Winner | |
| 2014 | Benjamin Bear in Bright Ideas | Philippe Coudray | Toon Books | Nominee | |
| 2014 | The Big Wet Balloon | Liniers | Toon Books | Nominee | |
| 2014 | Odd Duck | Cecil Castellucci and Sara Varon | First Second Books | Nominee | |
| 2014 | Otto's Backwards Day | Frank Cammuso with Jay Lynch | Toon Books | Nominee | |
| 2015 | The Zoo Box | Ariel Cohn and Aron Nels Steinke | First Second Books | Winner | |
| 2015 | BirdCatDog | Lee Nordling and Meritxell Bosch | Lerner Publishing Group/Graphic Universe | Nominee | |
| 2015 | A Cat Named Tim And Other Stories | John Martz | Koyama Press | Nominee | |
| 2015 | Hello Kitty, Hello 40: A Celebration in 40 Stories | Traci N. Todd and Elizabeth Kawasaki (eds) | Viz Media | Nominee | |
| 2015 | Mermin, Book 3: Deep Dives | Joey Weiser | Oni Press | Nominee | |
| 2016 | Little Robot | Ben Hatke | First Second Books | Winner | |
| 2016 | Anna Banana and the Chocolate Explosion | Dominque Roques and Alexis Dormal | First Second Books | Nominee | |
| 2016 | The Only Child | Guojing | Schwartz & Wade | Nominee | |
| 2016 | SheHeWe | Lee Nordling and Meritxell Bosch | Lerner Publishing Group/Graphic Universe | Nominee | |
| 2016 | Written and Drawn by Henrietta | Liniers | Toon Books | Nominee | |
| 2017 | Narwhal: Unicorn of the Sea | Ben Clanton | Tundra Books | Winner | |
| 2017 | Ape and Armadillo Take Over the World | James Sturm | Toon Books | Nominee | |
| 2017 | Burt's Way Home | John Martz | Koyama Press | Nominee | |
| 2017 | The Creeps, Book 2: The Trolls Will Feast! | Chris Schweizer | Abrams Books | Nominee | |
| 2017 | I'm Grumpy | Jennifer L. Holm and Matthew Holm | Random House | Nominee | |
| 2018 | Good Night, Planet | Liniers | Toon Books | Winner | |
| 2018 | Adele in Sand Land | Claude Ponti, trans. by Skeeter Grant and Françoise Mouly | Toon Books | Nominee | |
| 2018 | Arthur and the Golden Rope | Joe Todd-Stanton | Flying Eye Books/Nobrow Press | Nominee | |
| 2018 | Egg | Kevin Henkes | Greenwillow Books | Nominee | |
| 2018 | Little Tails in the Savannah | Frederic Brrémaud and Federico Bertolucci, trans. by Mike Kennedy | Lion Forge Comics/Magnetic Press | Nominee | |
| 2019 | Johnny Boo and the Ice Cream Computer | James Kochalka | Top Shelf Productions/IDW Publishing | Winner | |
| 2019 | Petals | Gustavo Borges | KaBOOM! | Nominee | |
| 2019 | Peter & Ernesto: A Tale of Two Sloths | Graham Annable | First Second Books | Nominee | |
| 2019 | This is a Taco! | Andrew Cangelose and Josh Shipley | CubHouse/Lion Forge Comics | Nominee | |
| 2019 | Tiger vs. Nightmare! | Emily Tetri | First Second Books | Nominee | |
| 2020 | Comics: Easy as ABC | Ivan Brunetti | Toon Books | Winner | |
| 2020 | Kitten Construction Company: A Bridge Too Fur | John Patrick Green | First Second Books/Macmillan Publishers | Nominee | |
| 2020 | The Pigeon HAS to Go to School! | Mo Willems | Hyperion Books | Nominee | |
| 2020 | A Trip to the Top of the Volcano with Mouse | Frank Viva | Toon Books | Nominee | |
| 2020 | ¡Vamos! Let’s Go to the Market | Raúl the Third | Versify/Houghton Mifflin Harcourt | Nominee | |
| 2020 | Who Wet My Pants? | Bob Shea and Zachariah Ohora | Little, Brown | Nominee | |
| 2021 | Our Little Kitchen | Jillian Tamaki | Abrams Books for Young Readers | Winner | |
| 2021 | Bear | Ben Queen and Joe Todd-Stanton | Archaia Entertainment/Boom! Studios | Nominee | |
| 2021 | Cat Kid Comic Club | Dav Pilkey | Scholastic Graphix | Nominee | |
| 2021 | Donut Feed the Squirrels | Mika Song | Random House Graphic/Random House Children's Books | Nominee | |
| 2021 | Kodi | Jared Cullum | Top Shelf Productions | Nominee | |
| 2021 | Lift | Minh Lê and Dan Santat | Little, Brown Young Readers | Nominee | |
| 2022 | Chibi Usagi: Attack of the Heebie Chibis | Julie and Stan Sakai | IDW Publishing | Winner | |
| 2022 | Join the Crow Crowd! | Elise Gravel | HarperAlley | Nominee | |
| 2022 | I Am Oprah Winfrey | Brad Meltzer and Christopher Eliopoulos | Dial Books for Young Readers | Nominee | |
| 2022 | Monster Friends | Kaeti Vandorn | Random House Graphic | Nominee | |
| 2022 | Tiny Tales: Shell Quest | Steph Waldo | HarperAlley | Nominee | |
| 2023 | The Pigeon Will Ride the Roller Coaster! | Mo Willems | Union Square Kids | Winner | |
| 2023 | Beneath The Trees: A Fine Summer | Dav | Magnetic Press | Nominee | |
| 2023 | Fox + Chick: Up and Down: and Other Stories | Sergio Ruzzier | Chronicle Books | Nominee | |
| 2023 | Grumpy Monkey Who Threw That? | Suzanne Lang and Max Lang | Random House Studio | Nominee | |
| 2023 | Hey, Bruce!: An Interactive Book | Ryan T. Higgins | Disney/Hyperion | Nominee | |
| 2024 | Bigfoot and Nessie: The Art of Getting Noticed | Chelsea M. Campbell and Laura Knetzger | Penguin Workshop | Winner | |
| 2024 | Burt the Beetle Lives Here! | Ashley Spires | Kids Can Press | Nominee | |
| 2024 | Go-Go Guys | Rowboat Watkins | Chronicle Books | Nominee | |
| 2024 | The Light Inside | Dan Misdea | Penguin Workshop | Nominee | |
| 2024 | Milk and Mocha: Our Little Happiness | Melani Sie | Andrews McMeel | Nominee | |
| 2024 | Tacos Today: El Toro & Friends | Raúl the Third | Versify | Nominee | |
| 2025 | Hilda and Twig Hide from the Rain | Luke Pearson | Flying Eye | Winner | |
| 2025 | Bog Myrtle | Sid Sharp | Annick Press | Nominee | |
| 2025 | Club Microbe | Elise Gravel, Montana Kane | Drawn & Quarterly | Nominee | |
| 2025 | Night Stories | Liniers | Astra Books | Nominee | |
| 2025 | Poetry Comics | Grant Snider | Chronicle Books | Nominee | |
| 2026 | All The Hulk Feels | Dan Santat | Abrams Fanfare/Marvel | Winner | |
| 2026 | The Faraway Forest: Wally's Route | Debbie Fong | Chronicle Books | Nominee | |
| 2026 | The Fire-Breathing Duckling | Frank Cammuso | TOON Books | Nominee | |
| 2026 | Night Light | Michael Emberley | Holiday House | Nominee | |
| 2026 | Steve, A Rare Egg | Kelly Collier | Kids Can Press | Nominee | |
