= Little Lit =

Comic book anthology series

- Cover of the second volume of Little Lit, artwork by Charles Burns.

Publication information
- Publisher: RAW Junior; HarperCollins/Joanna Cotler Books
- Schedule: On hiatus
- Genre: Alternative, Children's
- Publication date: 2000 – 2003
- No. of issues: 3
- Editor(s): Art Spiegelman; Françoise Mouly

Little Lit is a comic book anthology series published by New Yorker art editor, Françoise Mouly, and Pulitzer Prize-winning cartoonist, Art Spiegelman. The couple had collaborated previously on RAW in the 1980s. Little Lit featured work by some of RAW's most famous contributors as well as established children's book artists such as Maurice Sendak and Ian Falconer. Three volumes and one selected compilation have been published; the last volume was published in 2003, but now stand-alone books are being published in Toon Books, "from the Little Lit Library".

The second volume, Strange Stories for Strange Kids, was given a 2002 Firecracker Alternative Book Award.

== Description ==
Each volume of Little Lit is a collection of original comics created expressly for children, authored by major cartoonists and literary figures. Contributors include writers such as Paul Auster, Neil Gaiman, and David Sedaris; cartoonists such as Daniel Clowes, Tony Millionaire, and Chris Ware; and children's writers such as William Joyce, Barbara McClintock and Lemony Snicket (Daniel Handler). Volume one includes a vintage cartoon by Walt Kelly.

The series began publication in 2000 with a 64-page hardcover book, Little Lit: Folklore & Fairy Tale Funnies. This was followed by two subsequent volumes, Strange Stories for Strange Kids, and It Was a Dark and Silly Night... The third volume deviated slightly from previous versions, reducing the page count to 48 pages.

A smaller-sized paperback book called Big Fat Little Lit was published in 2006 by Puffin Books. This volume is a 144-page collection of selected comics from the first three HarperCollins books.

== Toon Books ==
As of 2008, stand-alone comic books for children are being published by Toon Books, described as "from the Little Lit Library".
