= Jimbo's Inferno =

2006 graphic novel by Gary Panter

Jimbo's Inferno is a 2006 graphic novel created by Gary Panter and published by Fantagraphics Books.

The contents of the book are from Jimbo #7 (Zongo Comics, 1997), reformatted to fit the dimensions of its prequel story, Jimbo in Purgatory (Fantagraphics, 2004). The two stories are loosely based on the first two books of Dante's Divine Comedy trilogy Inferno, Purgatorio, and Paradiso. In Jimbo's Inferno, the "inferno" in question is a Los Angeles shopping mall called Focky Bocky.

Jimnbo's Inferno was given an American Book Award in 2007.
