= The Best American Comics =

Annual anthology of independent short story comics

The Best American Comics was a yearly anthology of comics in the United States published by Houghton Mifflin from 2006 to 2019 as part of The Best American Series.

Stories were chosen using the same procedure as the other Best American titles, whereby a series editor chose 80–120 candidates from which a guest editor picked about 20 for publication. Most of the runner-up stories were listed in the appendix. The series editors were Anne Elizabeth Moore (2006–07), Jessica Abel & Matt Madden (2008–2013), and Bill Kartalopoulos (2014–2019).

On September 30, 2020, Kartalopoulos announced on Twitter that the series had been discontinued. He also provided a more detailed account of his time working on the series, and its cancellation on his personal website.

== Guest editors ==
- 2006: Harvey Pekar
- 2007: Chris Ware
- 2008: Lynda Barry
- 2009: Charles Burns
- 2010: Neil Gaiman
- 2011: Alison Bechdel
- 2012: Françoise Mouly
- 2013: Jeff Smith
- 2014: Scott McCloud
- 2015: Jonathan Lethem
- 2016: Roz Chast
- 2017: Ben Katchor
- 2018: Phoebe Gloeckner
- 2019: Jillian Tamaki
