= The Resistance (hashtag activism) =

American hashtag activism

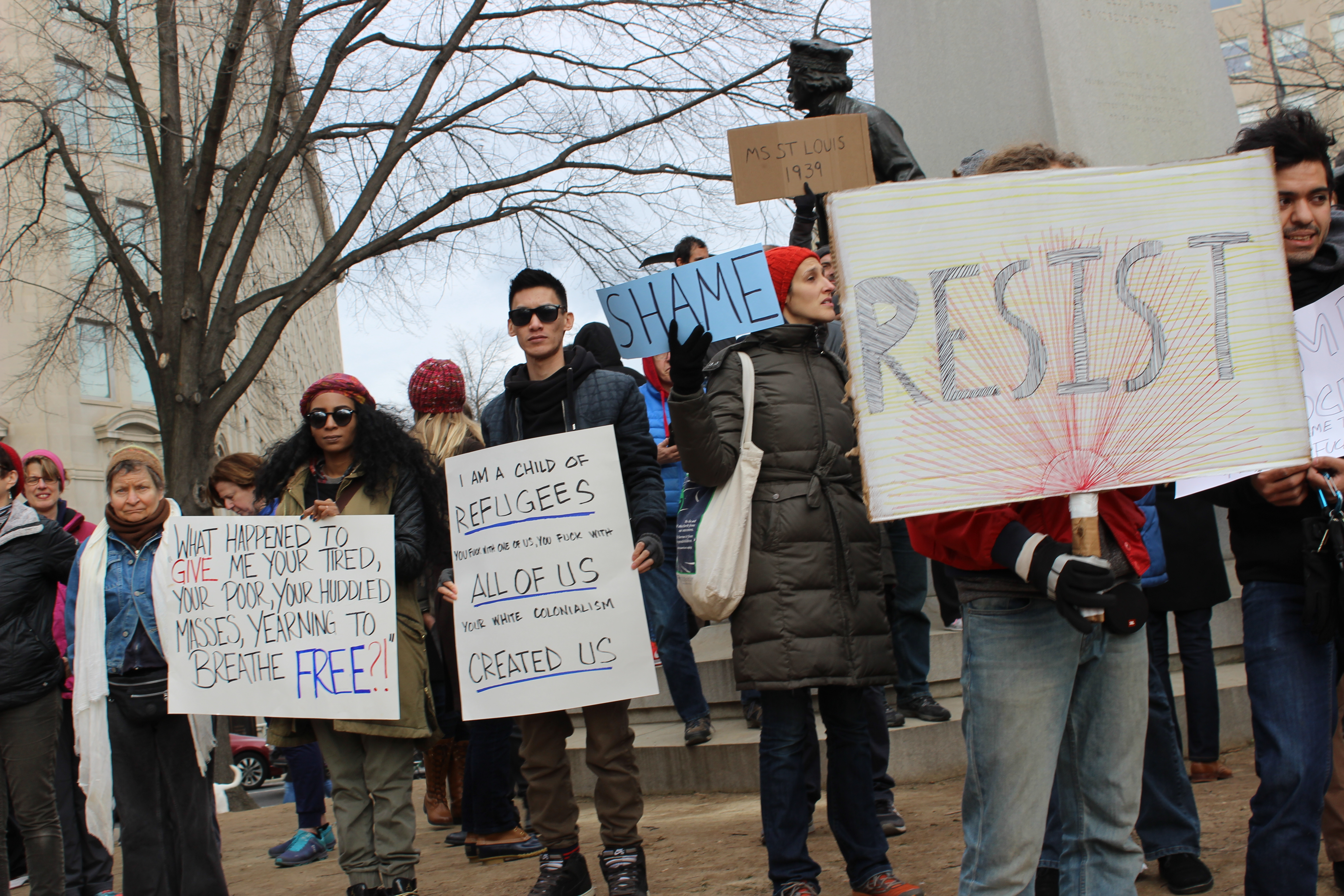
Protests against Executive Order 13769 in Washington, D.C.

The #Resistance (also known as the Resistance) is an American anti-authoritarian and liberal democratic hashtag and political label which has been used to protest the first and second presidencies of Donald Trump.

== Background ==
Commencing on an unknown date shortly after the presidential election in November 2016, it initially included Democrats on Twitter and Facebook before expanding to include independents and Republicans who opposed Trump on various social networking services. Members have been described as prolific in their use of Twitter, especially the #Resist hashtag and, early on, #TheResistance. These have been among the most consistent hashtags that have been used in the anti-Trump movement on social media.

== Popularity ==
Generally, the #Resistance symbolizes solidarity against Donald Trump. Its hashtags have also been used alongside other policy-specific hashtags, targeting marginalized groups such as minorities and women. Though its height of popularity occurred during the days following Trump's first inauguration, it resurfaced during times of political controversy and animosity. For instance, there was a notable spike in use throughout the week of Trump's response to the Unite the Right rally in Charlottesville, Virginia. Moreover, in the three days following the announcement of the initial Muslim ban in late January, #Resist appeared in over 2.5 million tweets. Several prominent celebrities have used the hashtag to show opposition to Trump, including Shailene Woodley, Zendaya, Sia, Rosie O'Donnell, Cher, Olivia Wilde, and Sophia Bush. The movement also resurged during and after Trump's successful campaign in the 2024 presidential election.

== Resist! paper ==
In 2017, Françoise Mouly and her daughter Nadja Spiegelman released two issues of the comics paper Resist!, part of The Resistance movement, criticizing the Donald Trump administration.

== See also ==
- Deep state in the United States
- "I Am Part of the Resistance Inside the Trump Administration"
- Indivisible movement
- Never Trump movement
- Brian and Ed Krassenstein
- 2017 Women's March
- 50501 movement
