= Eleanor Davis =

American cartoonist and illustrator

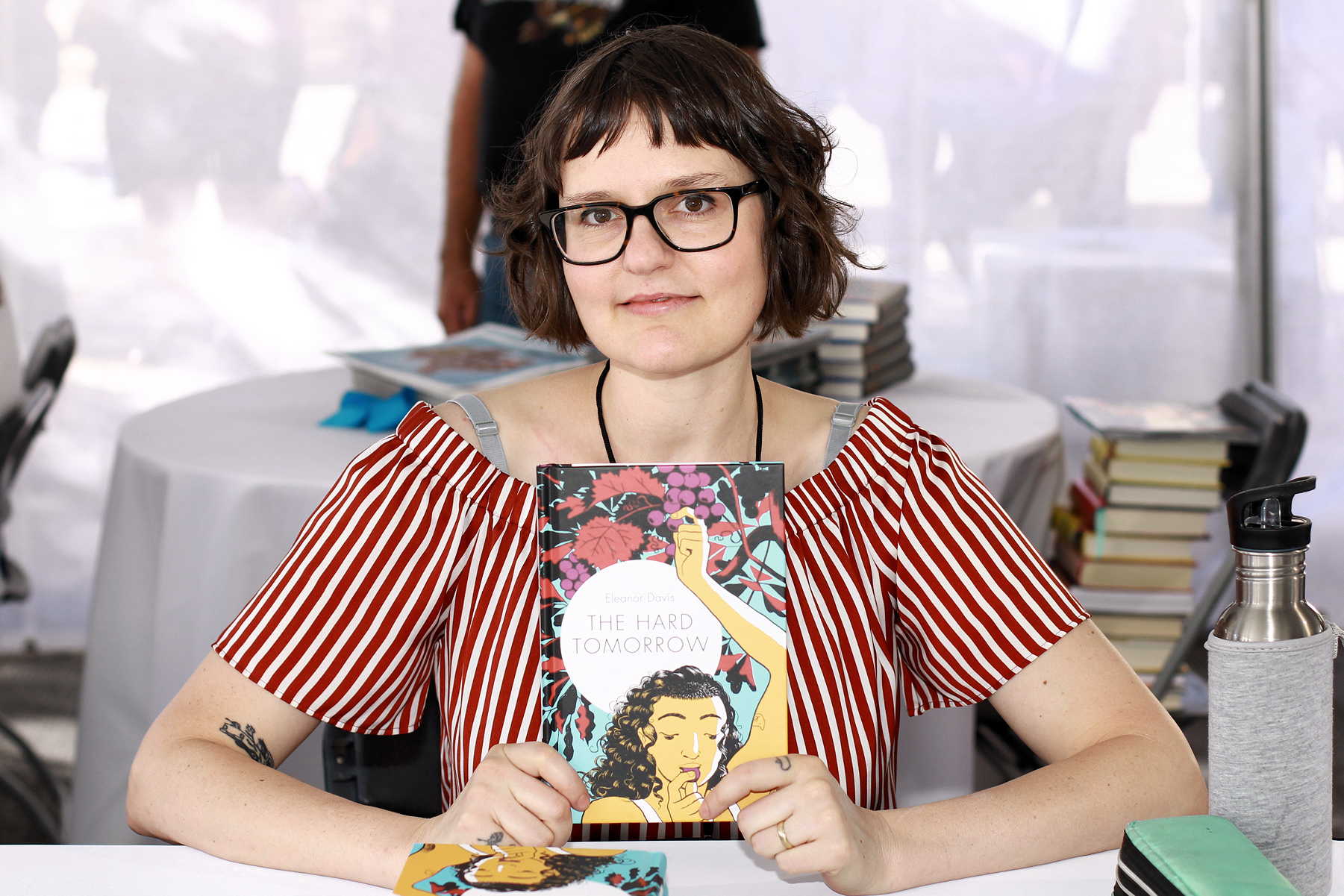
- Davis at the 2019 Texas Book Festival
- Born: Eleanor Davis; January 16, 1983 (age 43); Tucson, Arizona, USA
- Known for: Cartoonist
- Awards: Society of Illustrators Gold and Silver; Eisner Nominee; Ignatz Outstanding Graphic Novel Award (2018); Ignatz Outstanding Anthology or Collection (2015); Print Magazine’s New Visual Artists (2009); Theodor Seuss Geisel Honor; Russ Manning Award; Best American Comics (2008, 2013, 2015)
- Website: http://doing-fine.com/

Davis and Jillian Tamaki in discussion, 2017

Eleanor McCutcheon Davis (born January 16, 1983) is an American cartoonist and illustrator.

== Early life ==
Eleanor Davis was raised in Tucson, Arizona by comic-enthusiast parents who exposed her to stories like Little Lulu, Krazy Kat, Little Nemo, and the Kinder Kids. She attended Kino School, an alternative K-12 school in Tucson. In high school, she began drawing seriously and self-published her own comic. She studied sequential art at the Savannah College of Art and Design in Georgia.

== Career ==
Davis has self-published many comics, including The Beast Mother.

Davis's work has also been included in five issues of Fantagraphics' anthology MOME as well as Houghton Mifflin's Best American Comics in 2008.

Her easy-reader book, Stinky, was published in 2008 by Françoise Mouly's Toon Books and won an ALA Geisel Honor Award, a Booklist's Notable Children's Books Award, and the Bank Street College of Education's Best Children's Books of the Year in 2009 as well as the Association for Library Service to Children's Graphic Novels Reading List award in 2014. The Secret Science Alliance and the Copycat Crook, published by Bloomsbury Children's in 2009, was a collaborative book created with husband Drew Weing, who inked Davis' illustrations. In 2009, she won the Eisner's Russ Manning Most Promising Newcomer Award and was named one of Print magazine's New Visual Artists. In 2013, her short story In Our Eden received a gold medal from the Society of Illustrators.

In August 2014, Fantagraphics published Davis' first collection of stories How to Be Happy. Slate described the collection: "a mix of evocative, geometric watercolors and fluid pen-and-ink cartoons, How to Be Happy tells stories of sad people, lonely people, strong people, confident people, all trying to find a tiny bit of happiness in life." Upon publication, comics critic Richard Bruton described Davis as "without question, a major young creator."

Her 2017 graphic novel You & a Bike & a Road, published by Koyama Press, won the Ignatz Award for Outstanding Anthology or Collection.

In March 2018, Fantagraphics published Why Art?, a graphic novel in which Davis examines the concept of art. Her most recent graphic novel, The Hard Tomorrow, published by Drawn and Quarterly, was released in October 2019.

Davis has taught comic book storytelling summer classes at the University of Georgia.

== Personal life ==
Davis lives and works in Athens, Georgia, with fellow cartoonist and husband Drew Weing.

== Selected works ==
- Stinky. Toon Books. (2008) ISBN 0979923840
- The Secret Science Alliance and the Copycat Crook. (2009) Bloomsbury. ISBN 1599903962.
- How to Be Happy. Fantagraphics. (2014) ISBN 1606997408.
- You & a Bike & a Road. Koyama Press. (2017) ISBN 9781927668405.
- Why Art? Fantagraphics. (2018) ISBN 9781683960829.
- The Hard Tomorrow. Drawn and Quarterly. (2019) ISBN 978-1770463738.
