= Brian and Ed Krassenstein =

American writers/businessmen

Brian Krassenstein and Edward Krassenstein are twin brothers who are writers, entrepreneurs, and political commentators. They gained fame during the first presidency of Donald Trump by frequently making anti-Trump replies to Trump's Twitter account. The Krassensteins were suspended from Twitter in 2019 for operating fake accounts. They denied these allegations. In December 2022, their accounts were reinstated.

== Early life ==
The Krassensteins were born and raised in a Jewish household in Somers Point, New Jersey. They graduated from Mainland Regional High School in 2000. According to Brian, they launched their first business at the age of 15, selling baseball cards on the internet, before moving onto running Internet forums in the early 2000s. While attending Rutgers University, they started a business running online communities addressing topics such as video games, automobiles, and investing. They graduated from Rutgers University in 2004 with degrees in economics.

== Twitter / X ==
The Krassenstein brothers gained prominence as activists on Twitter, particularly within the "Resistance" movement, by consistently challenging the policies of Donald Trump. They frequently responded to Trump's tweets, drawing the attention and support of several prominent U.S. political figures, including members of Congress such as Eric Swalwell, Ayanna Pressley, Amy Klobuchar and Cory Booker, as well as political commentators like Van Jones and Megyn Kelly. The brothers regularly engaged in public debates with political figures and influencers, including Marjorie Taylor Greene and Alexandria Ocasio-Cortez, on contentious topics such as transgender rights, critical race theory, and gun control. After Trump blocked the Krassenstein brothers on Twitter, they were included in a lawsuit filed by the Knight First Amendment Institute against Trump. The lawsuit argued that Trump's Twitter account functioned as a public forum and that blocking users violated their First Amendment rights. In August 2018, following a federal court ruling, Trump unblocked the Krassensteins and numerous other critics.

In 2018, Brian raised $12,083 for the legal defense fund of former FBI deputy director Andrew McCabe by promoting a GoFundMe campaign on Twitter. "I just want to take a minute to thank each and every member of the DOJ and FBI who have come under attack by our President," Brian tweeted, having raised more money for McCabe's defense than any other individual social media user. In May 2019, Twitter suspended the accounts of both Krassenstein brothers. At the time of their suspension, Ed Krassenstein's account had an estimated 925,802 followers, while Brian Krassenstein's account had approximately 698,039 followers, according to Social Blade. Ed later revealed to The Daily Beast that his higher follower count was partly due to originally creating his account as a Justin Bieber fan account before rebranding it under his own name. Twitter justified the suspension by alleging that the brothers were using fake accounts in violation of the platform’s terms of service. In response, both Brian and Ed took to their Facebook accounts to protest the ban, calling on Twitter to provide evidence of their alleged misconduct or to reinstate their accounts.

Following their Twitter bans, the Krassenstein brothers reported that they were approached by pro-Trump conspiracy theorist Jacob Wohl, who had also been banned from the platform. Wohl reportedly proposed that they join forces to combat what he described as internet censorship. In a post on his personal Instagram account, Wohl claimed that he had intentionally purchased fake followers for the Krassensteins in an effort to get their accounts suspended from Twitter. After Twitter banned Brian and Ed, Brian's wife Heidi joined Twitter as "Mrs. Krassenstein". Despite speculation that her account was a front for Brian or Ed, Heidi told The Daily Beast that she was running the account herself. Heidi quit Twitter in November 2020, following the general projection of Joe Biden as the winner of the presidential election.

In December 2022, after Elon Musk purchased Twitter, several former Twitter employees who quit the company after Musk's takeover encouraged the Krassensteins to email Ella Irwin, Musk's new head of Trust and Safety, to see about getting their accounts back. Within an hour they had their accounts reinstated, according to Brian. Musk began following the Krassensteins on the platform, which he renamed X, and regularly engaged with them in political discussions on various topics, including diversity, equity, and inclusion (DEI), and George Soros. In one instance, Musk proposed the idea of hosting an X Space, where he, the Krassensteins and Alex Soros, son of billionaire George Soros, would debate on various topics. Musk’s discussions with the Krassensteins also ventured into lighter, more personal territory. During one interaction, Ed Krassenstein baited Musk into revealing his weight amid discussions about a potential cage fight with Mark Zuckerberg.

When X implemented its ad-revenue sharing program, the Krassensteins emerged as prominent recipients. This initiative, introduced by Elon Musk, was designed to reward content creators based on their engagement and follower count on the platform. In September 2025, Vice President JD Vance replied to Brian Krassenstein on X (formerly Twitter) after Krassenstein criticized a U.S. airstrike that destroyed a Venezuelan boat the Trump administration said was carrying drugs for the Tren de Aragua gang. When Krassenstein wrote that killing foreign civilians without due process amounted to a war crime, Vance responded, “I don’t give a shit what you call it,” an exchange that drew media attention.

== Business ventures ==
=== Investing forums ===
Beginning in 2003 or earlier, the Krassensteins began operating web forums such as TalkGold and MoneyMakerGroup. In August 2017, Homeland Security Special Agent Michael Adams of the United States Department of Justice alleged that these websites were devoted to the promotion of high-yield investment programs (HYIPs). The brothers wrote on Web-Life, one of their sites, that they ran "the ONLY safelist for HYIP".

The United States Department of Justice (DOJ) raided the Krassenstein brothers' homes and web site operations in 2017, pulling TalkGold and MoneyMakerGroup offline on or around August 22. In a civil asset forfeiture complaint, the DOJ accused the Krassensteins of obtaining property that was considered to be "traceable to proceeds of wire fraud." Investigators temporarily seized their phones and internet devices, and later seized their homes, a rental property and other investments. Adams claimed that the Krassensteins were paid huge sums of money by individuals engaged in illegal activities, and that they knew that the funds had been criminally derived. Ed Krassenstein denied any wrongdoing and said that he and his brother only sold advertising space to companies that they did not know to be fraudulent. He told The Daily Beast that he and his brother were not promoting anything and that the purpose of their websites was "to help people find out which online business opportunities were legitimate and which were not."

The brothers were never arrested or charged with a crime. The federal investigators later explained that the Krassensteins' websites allowed for the publication of ads for companies that were scams, and that a criminal organization from Russia was allegedly behind the ads. The DOJ investigated whether the brothers were actively involved in what the department described as Ponzi schemes. The Krassensteins settled their case with the federal government. They consented to asset forfeiture of about $450,000 from the sale of a rental property.

=== 3DPrint.com ===
The Krassensteins co-founded 3DPrint.com, a 3D printing and additive manufacturing resource, together in December 2013. In October 2014, the business received an equity investment from Sagamore LLC, and in September 2015, the Krassensteins sold the business to MecklerMedia in conjunction with New York-based Sagamore III LLC. The sale included a 25% equity stake in another website the brothers ran, 3DPrintBoard. The Krassensteins remained involved with 3DPrint as the directors of ad sales after the site was acquired.

=== Hill Reporter ===
In 2018, the Krassensteins, along with James Kosur, co-founded Hill Reporter, an online political news portal. They sold the website to Roman Romanuk, an ad tech businessman, in 2019.

=== NFTz ===
In August 2021, the Krassensteins, along with Martijn van Halen, Wouter van Halen, and Bas van Halen, co-founded NFTz.me, an NFT marketplace and community built on the DeSo blockchain. NFTz received funding from the DeSo Foundation's Octane Fund. The Krassensteins purchased the first NFT created by Tiffany Trump, Donald's daughter. She then bought an NFT that the brothers created.

== Writing ==
The Krassensteins wrote extensively for their own web site, 3DPrint, between December 2013 and September 2015. They did the same for Hill Reporter in 2018 and 2019.

In August 2018, the Krassensteins published a parody book, mocking the Trump family, titled How the People Trumped Ronald Plump. Initially they had attempted to crowdfund the book as a children's book in 2017, but their Kickstarter campaign raised just 42% of its goal. The book itself received mixed reviews. Many Twitter users and several journalists criticized Benny Rahdiana's illustrations of characters such as Ronald Plump (designed to resemble Donald Trump), Weave Bannon (Steve Bannon), Loudimir Tootin (Vladimir Putin), and Robert Moral (Robert Mueller). Before the book was published, critics found fault with its depictions of Mueller, as a shirtless superhero, and of a woman resembling Elizabeth Warren being carried in a burlap sack. The Washington Free Beacon referred to the book as a “widely celebrated children's book.” The brothers responded to criticisms of Mueller's depiction by posting numerous illustrations of shirtless superheroes and also a shirtless photo of themselves, which The Daily Dot referred to as “topless selfies”.

In October 2018, the Krassensteins were the first to report on a smear campaign alleging sexual assault against special counsel Robert Mueller. The scheme was perpetrated by political operative Jacob Wohl and radio host Jack Burkman. The Krassensteins also tipped off Mueller about the allegations, and Mueller referred the scheme to the FBI for investigation. The Krassensteins connected Wohl to a company called Surefire Intelligence, which allegedly perpetrated the scheme and which allegedly made a threatening phone call to the Krassensteins.

The Krassensteins were both contributors for The Independent, writing several op-ed pieces for the publication in 2019. In November 2019, the Krassensteins published an article based on a months-long investigation into an alleged smear campaign directed at Congresswoman Ilhan Omar. The Krassensteins' report stated that the operation was being perpetrated by two different countries—the United Arab Emirates and Saudi Arabia—as well as multiple prominent GOP figures. They also correctly predicted that a man named Abdullah Al-Saleh would emerge as a witness in the scheme.

In 2020, the Krassensteins used a Medium blog to publish a series of articles about Tara Reade, who had made sexual assault allegations against then-presidential candidate Joe Biden. The articles dove into the question of whether Reade had once written a blog post that was translated into Russian, suggested that her story was inconsistent and showed that Reade had praised Biden for his actions in helping stop sexual assault on multiple occasions. Journalist Claire Goforth of The Daily Dot wrote that the articles were meant to discredit Reade's allegations. They were spread widely by Biden's supporters.

== Media appearances ==
On December 12, 2018, Vice News Tonight included a segment on Brian and Ed Krassenstein entitled "Meet the Krassensteins, the superstar bros of #Resistance Twitter." The segment followed the brothers on the day that former Trump attorney Michael Cohen was sentenced to prison. The Krassensteins played themselves in several episodes of a A Fowl American, an animated series of web shorts by Greg Cipes and Kevin Coulston.

From January to September 2019, the brothers hosted KrassenCast: Defending What's Left, a podcast about political news. Guests on their show included 2020 presidential candidates Andrew Yang, Marianne Williamson, and Seth Moulton; 2020 Senate candidate Jaime Harrison; and U.S. Representative Ro Khanna. In January 2024, the Krassensteins participated in a live debate, hosted by ZeroHedge, alongside Destiny, where they faced off against Alex Jones and Glenn Greenwald. The debate focused on the events surrounding the January 6 United States Capitol attack.

== Personal lives ==
As of 2019, the brothers reside in Fort Myers, Florida, and graduated from Rutgers University in 2004 with degrees in economics.
