= Bi (Kevin Johansen album) =

Studio album by Kevin Johansen
- Released: 18 June 2012
- Studio: Del Arco y El pie
- Genre: Latin alternative; Latin rock; singer/songwriter; comedy rock; pop rock
- Length: 1:43:00
- Label: Sony Music
- Producer: Javier Tenenbaum, Osqui Amante, Tweety González

Kevin Johansen chronology
| Kevin Johansen + The Nada + Liniers = Vivo en Buenos Aires (2010) | Bi (2012) | Mis Américas (2016) |

Bi is the sixth studio album by American-Argentinian singer-songwriter Kevin Johansen, released on 18 June 2012 by Sony Music. Made up by two discs: Jogo (Subtropicalia) recorded in Del Arco studio; and Fogo (Pop Heart) recorded in El Pie studios.

The album expresses the duality of the author Heritage and upbringing. Jogo represents his mother's side, his Latin-American folk. Fogo is closer to his father side, pop-rock.

== Track listing ==
All tracks are written by Kevin Johansen, except where noted

Jogo (Subtropicalia)
| No. | Title | Writer(s) | Length |
|---|---|---|---|
| 1. | "Amor finito" | | 3:25 |
| 2. | "Baja a la tierra (feat. Lila Downs)" | Lila Downs and Kevin Johansen | 3:22 |
| 3. | "Jogo (Subtropicalia)" | | 2:07 |
| 4. | "Tan fácil" | | 3:34 |
| 5. | "Veredas de agua" | Fernando Cabrera | 0:52 |
| 6. | "Vecino" | | 3:37 |
| 7. | "My name is peligro" | | 4:14 |
| 8. | "Alta, fea y linda" | | 4:15 |
| 9. | "Milonga que pasó" | | 3:36 |
| 10. | "Picaflor" | | 3:24 |
| 11. | "Nunca digas siempre" | | 3:01 |
| 12. | "Whyoh" | | 2:47 |
| 13. | "Chacarera del deseo (Cómo pega el sol)" | | 3:47 |
| 14. | "Waiting for the Sun to Shine" | Paulinho Moska and Kevin Johansen | 3:43 |
| 15. | "Buenos Aires Río" | | 2:29 |
| 16. | "Nieva en Buenos Aires" | | 3:34 |

Fogo (Pop Heart)
| No. | Title | Writer(s) | Length |
|---|---|---|---|
| 1. | "Y sigo (Canción de auto ayuda para mí)" | | 4:02 |
| 2. | "No digas quizás" | | 4:34 |
| 3. | "Down in the Forest (So many lovers)" | | 2:07 |
| 4. | "Glass" | | 4:09 |
| 5. | "Party Girl (Love You to Death)" | | 4:44 |
| 6. | "Basta ya de bastas (Rastars & rockstars)" | | 3:03 |
| 7. | "Seventeen" | | 4:07 |
| 8. | "Apocalypso" | | 4:27 |
| 9. | "No tiene nombre" | | 3:36 |
| 10. | "Los tics del jazzero (Tics of the jazz man)" | | 3:24 |
| 11. | "Dark Side of Me" | | 3:01 |
| 12. | "Everybody Knows" | Leonard Cohen, Sharon Robinson | 5:24 |
| 13. | "Modern Love" | David Bowie | 3:47 |
