= Drew Weing =

American comic artist

- Citizenship: United States
- Occupation: Webcomic creator
- Spouse: Eleanor Davis
- Writing career
- Language: English
- Years active: 2010-Present
- Notable works: Set to Sea, The Creepy Case Files of Margo Maloo

Drew Weing is an American comic artist. Debuting in 2010 with the black-and-white graphic novel Set to Sea, Weing went on to create the webcomic The Creepy Case Files of Margo Maloo. Together with his wife Eleanor Davis, Weing has taught cartooning classes at the University of Georgia. Weing is large fan of the serialized aspect of webcomics.

== Career ==
Drew Weing debuted in 2010 with the black-and-white graphic novel Set to Sea. The book, containing very little dialogue, features Popeye-like character designs combined with highly detailed backgrounds. Set to Sea presents one large panel on each of the graphic novel's 140 pages. The story of Set to Sea parodies Boys' Own tales such as Treasure Island and Captains Courageous, as it "[follows] the transition from innocence to experience for an aspiring poet kidnapped and forced into sailor life." Set to Sea was intended only as a small and experimental side project, with Weing initially drawing a single panel every day. However, as the single panels started to take him multiple days to complete, Weing realized that the comic had turned into a worthwhile story.

Since 2009, Weing and his wife Eleanor Davis have been teaching cartooning at the University of Georgia as part of its "Summer Academy" program. Their students, 11- to 17-year-old children, were taught various aspects of comics, though Weing noted that the best things for them to do was to "basically to keep out of the kids’ way and let them have fun," in order to keep the children from getting self-conscious.

In August 2015, Weing co-published a comic book with his wife titled Flop to the Top!. Published through Toon Books, the book is intended for first- and second-grade children and features a "silly and amiable fable of viral fame."

Since February 2014, Drew Weing has been running the webcomic The Creepy Case Files of Margo Maloo, about a boy named Charles Thompson who moves to a monster-ridden apartment building. The title character Margo Maloo is a "monster mediator" who helps sort out the situation. A print version of Margo Maloo was published by First Second in September 2016. The webcomic started out as a collaboration between Weing and his wife as they were trying to come up with a pitch for a one-page serial comic for Nickelodeon Magazine. The character Margo was created by passing a sketchbook back and forth, "tweaking her design and adding details." Though the serial never happened, Weing kept the idea in mind for years. Eventually, he realized the character need a sidekick: Weing described early designs for Charles as a "shrimpy, nervous little kid," but the more assertive Charles formed shortly after. Though Weing has an ending for the story planned, he is planning to continue the story indefinitely as "there are an infinite amount of monster misunderstandings in Echo City" and he wants to chronicle as many of Margo's adventures as he can. The Los Angeles Times described the first book as "just the beginning of [the characters'] adventures."

== On webcomics ==
Weing created the infinite canvas webcomic Pup, which he initially made available solely on Serializer. In an interview with Paste Magazine, Weing stated that the entirety of his comics career has involved the World Wide Web in some form, with Set to Sea being serialized online before print publication as well. When asked by the Los Angeles Times what he thinks of the format, Weing stated that "there are many webcomics that are dear to my heart". In particular, Weing has frequently praised how serialized comics force a reader to read slowly: as someone reads a couple pages a week rather than binge reading the entire comic directly, their "life [gets wrapped] up with the characters." He described this as "getting a little check-in from a friend every day" and considers this an entirely different experience from that which one gets with comic books and graphic novels.

== Personal life ==
Drew Weing is married to cartoonist Eleanor Davis, whom he has described as his "primary editor and audience, and vice versa." Though the two keep separate work spaces – Davis working in the corner room in their house and Weing doing his work in the studio across the street – the two meet back up for dinner and discuss what progress they have made that day. Though Davis goes to bed early in the evening and wakes up early as well, Weing tends to stay up late doing computer work.

Weing and Davis moved to Athens, Georgia "kind of on a whim", after having visited the town for its Fluke minicomic festival. In an interview, Weing stated that his "dream" is for the local comics scene to gradually overshadow the Athens music scene.
