= Toon Books =

American publishing company

- Predecessor: Little Lit
- Founded: 2008
- Founder: Françoise Mouly
- Headquarters location: New York City
- Distribution: Consortium Book Sales & Distribution (US); Diamond Book Distributors (international)
- Key people: Francoise Mouly, Art Spiegelman
- Imprints: Toon Graphics
- Owner: Raw Junior
- Official website: toon-books.com

Toon Books is a publisher of hardcover comic book early readers founded by Françoise Mouly. With titles by such creators as Geoffrey Hayes, Jay Lynch, Dean Haspiel, Eleanor Davis, and Mouly's collaborator and husband, Art Spiegelman, Toon Books promotes its line as "the first high-quality comics designed for children ages four and up".

== History ==
The concept for Toon Books came to Mouly when her son Dash was learning to read, and his first-grade teacher assigned him "easy readers". Appalled by the lack of appeal of the educational material, Mouly instead spent time with her child and armloads of French comic books. In fact, one of the first Toon Books releases was Agnès Rosenstiehl's Silly Lilly, a.k.a. Mimi Cracra, a comic-book character familiar to millions of French toddlers.

After proposing the Toon Books idea to major children's books publishers from 2004 to 2007, and being rejected because the proposed books didn't fit existing categories, Mouly returned to her roots as a self-publisher — she had founded her small press, RAW Books & Graphics, in 1977, and RAW Junior in 1999. As she had done for the avant-garde comics and graphics magazine RAW, or the kids comics anthology Little Lit, both of which she co-edited, or for the covers of The New Yorker, Mouly gathered an array of talent for Toon Books.

2008 saw the launch of eight titles, featuring star authors (such as Harry Bliss, Art Spiegelman or Jeff Smith), veteran children's book authors (Geoffrey Hayes) as well as novice cartoonists (Eleanor Davis, the author of Stinky, was still in art school when Mouly contacted her). The initial line of titles received glowing reviews and multiple awards, prizes, and distinctions. Upon Toon Books' debut, Publishers Weekly characterized the line as having the potential to revitalize the field of comics for kids: "Françoise Mouly is at it again. After transforming American comics with the seminal 1980s comics anthology RAW, Mouly is now out to teach kids to read by using comics".

In fall 2012, Toon Books released its first Toon graphic novel, The Secret of the Stone Frog, by David Nytra. Two years later, Toon Books launched an imprint called Toon Graphics aimed at readers eight and up.

== Distribution ==
When it first launched, Toon Books was distributed by Diamond Books, a unit of Diamond Comic Distributors dedicated to getting comics and graphic novels into the book trade. In 2010, Toon Books entered into a distribution partnership with Candlewick Press. In late summer/early fall of 2014, Toon Books launched the new line TOON Graphics, an imprint for readers 8 and up. It was distributed from by Consortium, a unit of Perseus, a move that reflects Toon's true status as a small but expanding independent publisher.

== TOON in the classroom ==
Attitudes towards comics have radically changed since the 1954 Congressional hearings where they were denounced as the cause of juvenile delinquency. They are now touted by progressive librarians and educators as an effective tool for children to discover the pleasures of reading. As Art Spiegelman said, "comics can be a gateway drug to literacy".

In the absence of any model or precedent, Mouly developed her own methodology to make sure the TOON Books would be well adapted to beginning readers' needs. She consulted with educators as she developed each individual book but also took rough drafts of the stories to schools, taking notes while watching children read. Responding to educators' and librarians' suggestions, Mouly expanded the Toon Books line with bilingual versions (French publisher Casterman just released French-English Toon Books), audio versions (which will be developed into a novel multilingual tool for ESL and/or support for reluctant readers), as well as the first nonfiction Toon Book.

Toon Books have been greeted enthusiastically by librarians, teachers, and parents looking for material for early readers. Early on, the Maryland State Superintendent of Schools, Dr. Nancy Grasmick, embraced Toon Books as part of the Maryland Comic Book Initiative. Other states' school systems are now considering Toon Books for their own Comics in the Classroom initiatives. The books are part of Renaissance Learning's Accelerated Reader Program and have been assigned Reading Recovery and Lexile levels, all of which are firsts for comics for young children.

The Toon Books website offers free online learning tools for both students and educators. Downloadable lesson plans and activity sheets provide teachers with leveled lesson plans for kindergarten through third grade. Other tools include free online readers, videos, and games.

The free "CarTOON Maker" invites readers to make their own cartoons. The online Readers Theater teaches educators how to get students to perform TOON Books. On the Toon site for kids, early readers can make paper puppets, watch videos, and learn "CarTOON" lessons from master cartoonists.

=== The TOON Leveling System ===
The TOON into Reading program is divided into three levels:

- Level 1 — first comics for brand new readers, recommended for Grades K–1. Contain 200–300 easy sight words, short sentences, usually one character, a single time frame, and 1–2 panels per page. Example: Silly Lilly and the Four Seasons
- Level 2 — easy-to-read comics for emerging readers, recommended for Grades 1–2. Contain 300–600 words, short sentences and repetition, a story arc with few characters, and a few panels per page. Example: Benny and Penny in Just Pretend
- Level 3 — chapter-book comics for advanced beginners, recommended for grades 2–3. Contain 800–1000 words in long sentences, a story that takes place in a broad world with shifts in time and place, chapters, and opportunities for the reader to make connections and speculate. Example: Zig and Wikki in Something Ate My Homework

== Awards and honors ==
In 2009, Stinky, written and illustrated by Eleanor Davis, was named a Theodor Seuss Geisel Honor Book. The Theodor Seuss Geisel Award is awarded to the author(s) and illustrator(s) of the most renowned book for early readers published in English in the U.S.A.

Geoffrey Hayes' Benny and Penny: The Big No-No! won the 2010 Theodor Seuss Geisel Award, while Jeff Smith's Little Mouse Gets Ready was named a 2010 Theodor Seuss Geisel Honor Book.

Liniers' Good Night, Planet won the 2018 Eisner Award for Best Publication for Early Readers, and Ivan Brunetti's Comics: Easy as ABC won the same award in 2020. Toon Books have been nominated multiple times for that same award since the award's inception in 2012, including the years 2012, 2013, 2014, 2016, 2017, 2018, and 2020.

== Bibliography ==
- Benny and Penny in Just Pretend (Geoffrey Hayes), 2008
- Otto's Orange Day (Frank Cammuso & Jay Lynch), 2008
- Silly Lilly and the Four Seasons (Agnès Rosenstiehl), 2008
- Stinky (Eleanor Davis), 2008
- Mo & Jo Fighting Together Forever (Dean Haspiel & Jay Lynch), 2008
- Jack and the Box (Art Spiegelman), 2008
- Luke on the Loose (Harry Bliss), 2009
- Benny and Penny: The Big No-No! (Geoffrey Hayes), 2009
- Little Mouse Gets Ready (Jeff Smith), 2009
- Benny and Penny in The Toy Breaker (Geoffrey Hayes), 2010
- Zig and Wikki in Something Ate My Homework (Nadja Spiegelman & Trade Loeffler), 2010
- Silly Lilly in What Will I Be Today? (Agnès Rosenstiehl), 2011
- Patrick in a Teddy Bear's Picnic and Other Stories (Geoffrey Hayes), 2011
- Benjamin Bear in Fuzzy Thinking (Philippe Coudray), 2011
- Nina in That Makes Me Mad! (Hilary Knight & Steven Kroll), 2011
- Chick and Chickie (Claude Ponti), 2012
- Zig and Wikki in The Cow (Nadja Spiegelman & Trade Loeffler), 2012
- The Shark King (R. Kikuo Johnson), 2012
- A Trip to the Bottom of the World with Mouse (Frank Viva), 2012
- Maya Makes a Mess (Rutu Modan), 2012
- Benny and Penny in Lights Out! (Geoffrey Hayes), 2012
- The Secret of the Stone Frog (David Nytra), 2012
- Barry's Best Buddy (Renée French), 2013
- Benjamin Bear in Bright Ideas! (Philippe Coudray), 2013
- Otto's Backward Day (Frank Cammuso with Jay Lynch), 2013
- The Big Wet Balloon (Liniers), 2013
- Hearts (Thereza Rowe), 2014
- Tippy's Night Parade (Lilli Carré), 2014
- Benny and Penny in Lost and Found (Geoffrey Hayes), 2014
- Flop to the Top! (Eleanor Davis and Drew Weing), 2015
- We Dig Worms! (Kevin McCloskey), 2015
- Written and Drawn by Henrietta (Liniers), 2015
- Ape and Armadillo Take Over the World (James Sturm), 2016
- Good Night, Planet (Liniers), 2017
- Adele in Sand Land (Claude Ponti), 2017 (originally published in French as Adèle et la pelle in 1988)
- Comics: Easy as ABC (Ivan Brunetti), 2019
- A Trip to the Top of the Volcano with Mouse (Frank Viva), 2019

== See also ==
- Papercutz
