= Kevin Johansen =

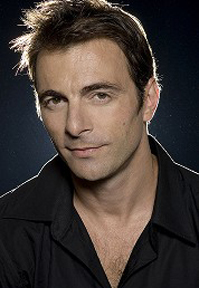
- Kevin Johansen in 2007

Background information
- Born: Kevin Andrew Johansen; 21 June 1964 (age 62); Fairbanks, Alaska
- Genres: Alternative rock; pop rock; rock
- Occupation: Musician
- Years active: 1982–present
- Labels: Sony International; Los Años Luz; Wrasse; K Indústria
- Website: Official website

Kevin Johansen (born 21 June 1964) is an American-born Argentine musician and singer-songwriter. He is known for mixing several rhythms and languages in his musical work.

== Biography ==
Kevin Johansen was born on June 21, 1964, in Fairbanks, Alaska, to Marta Gloria Calvet and Kent Johansen. Marta Calvet was an Argentine feminist and polyglot; she met Kent Johansen while studying in Denver. They moved to Alaska and lived there until Kevin was 5 years old. In 1969, they moved to Phoenix where his sister Karina was born. His parents got divorced soon after, and he moved with his mother and sister to San Francisco.

His mother remarried a Mexican painter, but in time the relationship became abusive and she decided to leave her husband and the US in 1976. Johansen spent his teenage years between Buenos Aires and Montevideo. In 1990 he married an Argentine ballerina in Buenos Aires, and the young couple moved to New York so she could continue her dance studies. Johansen worked as a waiter, tourist guide and translator, until he got a chance to start performing regularly at CBGB and get his musical career on track.

=== Career ===
He started to play guitar and write lyrics at 14, and by the end of high school he decided to become a musician. Johansen made a brief appearance in the local rock scene with the band Instrucción Cívica with Julian Benjamin in the 80s they released two albums: Obediencia Debida in 1985 and Instrucción Cívica in 1986.

In 1990 he moved with his girlfriend of that time to New York. He had several jobs unrelated to music, until Hilly Kristal heard him sing and invited him to perform at his club CBGB. He played at CBGB for several years, until he created the group The Nada, and in 2000 recorded the album with the same name, which consists in a mix of different Latin sounds with modern pop, funk and rock.

By the end of 2002 Johansen delivered the album Sur o no Sur, which was released by the label Los Años Luz in Argentina and by Sony Music in the rest of the world. During 2003 Johansen achieved greater success in Argentina, playing in June of that year at the Gran Rex Theatre, the largest Buenos Aires hall. Touring in Spain, he promoted his new album with concerts in Madrid and Barcelona, this time with bigger audiences. He also performed at the MTV Latin Awards, from where he continued a series of concerts in Miami, New York, Chicago, Los Angeles and San Francisco, prior to the release of Sur o no Sur in United States.

In 2010 he returned to Argentina, where he currently lives. In that same year he released the live album Kevin Johansen + The Nada + Liniers = Vivo en Buenos Aires, published again by Los Años Luz. It led to Johansen and the group going on tour as far as Spain (the album was edited there by K Industrias).

He has performed in countries such as Mexico, Chile and Belgium. Spain, and also Colombia, are among the countries with positive response from fans and the media. At the Latino Grammy Awards, 2002's Sur o no Sur was nominated for "Album of the year", "Song of the year" ("La Procesión") and "Best Music Video" ("La Procesión").

For about 15 years, most of the visual arts of his music was done by the Cartoonist Ricardo Siri Liniers. They went on several tours together, where Liniers would draw along to Johansen music while the latter's sketches were projected in the back of the stage. They have also published a book together, titled Oops!.

In 2024, Johansen acted alongside Sofia Gala for the first time in a feature film called Underground Orange.

== Personal life ==
Johansen divorced his first wife and he remarried in 2006 to María Laura Franco. He currently lives in Buenos Aires with Maria and his four children: Miranda (who is also in the music business), Kim, Tom and Roy.

== Critic reviews ==
Newspapers from different countries have highlighted Johansen's combination of musical styles and languages. He naturally switches from English to Spanish, or from cumbia to rock. He is seen as an artist who is not afraid to experiment. Since he has not settled on one genre, he usually calls his work “de genre-ate”.

== Discography ==
- The Nada (2000)
- Sur o no Sur (2002)
- City Zen (2004)
- Logo (2007)
- Kevin Johansen + The Nada + Liniers = Vivo en Buenos Aires (2010)
- Bi (2012)
- Kevin Johansen + The Nada + Liniers: (Bi)vo en México (2014)
- Mis Américas (2016)
- Algo ritmos (2019)
- Tú Ve = You Go (2022)
- Quiero Mejor (2024)
- Desde Que Te Madrid (2025)
