= Rozz Tox Manifesto =

1979 essay by Gary Panter

- Author: Gary Panter
- Language: English
- Publication date: 1979

The Rozz Tox Manifesto is a 1979 essay by visual artist Gary Panter in which Panter rejects the notion of the artist as bohemian; instead, an artist is encouraged to work within capitalism to reach a larger market.

== Effects on culture ==
The essay influenced Panter's friend Matt Groening, who later went on to become the creator of The Simpsons.

In Matt Howarth's comic Stalking Ralph, the musical group The Residents are portrayed as being created by a "Rozz Tox Virus", whose ultimate goal is to constantly mutate to avoid becoming part of mainstream culture. While the text of the manifesto does not appear in the comic, an alien creature declares, "The underground becomes the establishment", and that the reason The Residents change their band identity so often is to remain underground and to avoid becoming establishment. Howarth's interpretation of Rozz Tox is different from Groening's. While Groening has worked within a capitalist system to create and to perpetuate successful merchandising, Howarth's characters are specifically avoiding "selling out" and avoiding popular acceptance.

The manifesto is the namesake of outsider art gallery, venue, and café Rozz-Tox in Rock Island, Illinois. The café is a favorite stop among touring musicians and is known for events that are unique to the Quad Cities area, with special programming dedicated to hosting international experimental artists.
