= Macanudo (comic) =

- Author: Liniers
- Current status/schedule: Current
- Launch date: 2002; 24 years ago
- Syndicate: King Features Syndicate; (2018–present)
- Publisher: La Nación
- Genre(s): Humor, gag-a-day, satire, children

Macanudo is an Argentine daily comic strip by the cartoonist Liniers. It has been published since 2002 in the newspaper La Nación. It appears on the last page of the paper. Macanudo is published in newspapers and book collections in several countries, such as Brazil, Canada (Quebec), Czech Republic, and Italy. Since September 2018, the strip is distributed in English by King Features Syndicate.

Just like Liniers' previous strip, Bonjour, Macanudo is very experimentaland deals with meta humor. It has been considered very popular.

In May 2025, it was announced an animated series based on the comic strip is currently in production. The series will be produced by Mercury Filmworks and is slated for 2027 or 2028.

== Characters ==
Macanudo generally follows a nonlinear plot line, but several characters frequently recur:

- Henrietta (Enriqueta), a little girl who reads a lot, and has a large imagination, her confidant Fellini, a sneaky black cat, and Mandelbaum (Madariaga), her teddy bear .
- The Man who Translates Movie Titles.
- Z-25, the sensitive robot.
- The duendes (gnomes), a group of fantastic creatures often likened to cause superstitions.
- Huberta and Gudrun, forest-dwelling witches.
- Penguins, compared to humanity on several occasions.
- Oliverio the Olive,
- The boy Martin (Martincito) and his imaginary friend Olga, a blue furry monster.
- Yellow thing and Blue thing, two abstract beings that appear together
- The Mysterious Man in Black
- Liniers himself, both as a human and as an anthropomorphized rabbit
- Lorenzo and Teresita, a human couple
- Johnson and his friend Carlitos, a little blue bird
- Pablo Picasso
- La Guadalupe
- Alfio, the troglodyte ball
- The hermit from the mountain
- José Luis, the unhappy man
- The Cinephile Cow
- Frogs
- Aliens
- Cows
- "Gente que anda por ahi (People that wander around)", which may be considered a "segment" in which normal people named by their surnames perform normal activities.

== Collected works ==
Macanudo has been collected into 5 volumes published by Ediciones de la Flor:

- Macanudo Nº1 which collects the strips from June 2002 to November 2003 (April 2004)
- Macanudo Nº2 which collects strips published between 2003 and 2004 (April 2005)
- Macanudo Nº3 (April 2006)
- Macanudo Nº4 (December 2006)
- Macanudo Nº5 (October 2007)

Later volumes are published by Editorial Común:

- Macanudo Nº6 (2009)
- Macanudo Nº7 (2010)
- Macanudo Nº8 (2010)
- Macanudo Nº9 (2012)
- Macanudo Nº10 (2013)
- Macanudo Nº11 (2015)
- Macanudo Nº12 (2016)
- Macanudo Nº13 (2017)
- Macanudo N°14 (2024)

After getting syndicated in the US, Fantagraphics began publishing the collected strips in English:

- Macanudo: Welcome to Elsewhere (2022)
- Macanudo: Optimism is for the Brave (2023)
- Macanudo: The Way of the Penguin (2024)
