= Ben Hatke =

American cartoonist and illustrator

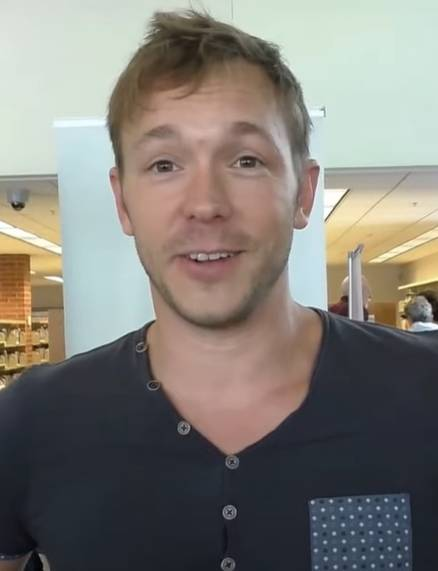
- Ben Hatke at the 2016 Ann Arbor Comic Arts Festival
- Born: June 4, 1977 (age 49) Lafayette, Indiana, U.S.
- Notable works: Zita the Spacegirl; Mighty Jack
- Awards: Cybils Award, 2011; Eisner Award, 2016
- Spouse: Anna
- Children: 6

Ben Hatke (born June 4, 1977) is an American cartoonist and children's book illustrator. He is most well known for his series of middle grade graphic novels Zita the Spacegirl. His work is notable for its focus on strong female characters.

== Biography ==
Hatke was born in Lafayette, Indiana, and grew up with sisters. His family were members of the Society for Creative Anachronism, and Hatke spent a lot of time outdoors as a child.

One of his early comics influences was Wendy and Richard Pini's Elfquest. Other influences included Bill Watterson, Maurice Sendak, Leonardo da Vinci, Brian Froud, Trina Schart Hyman, Barry Windsor-Smith, and Todd McFarlane.

Hatke earned his B.A. from Christendom College in 2000. While he was in college, he spent a semester in Italy studying Italian Renaissance painting.

== Career ==
Hatke contributed the story "The Plank" to the anthology Flight vol. 2, published by Image Comics in 2005. His story "The Edge" appeared in Flight #3, published (at that point by Random House) in 2006.

His character Mighty Jack is a contemporary spin on the fairy tale of Jack and the Beanstalk.

=== Zita the Spacegirl ===
According to The Hollywood Reporter, Zita the Spacegirl, "centers on a girl named Zita who embarks on a journey to becoming an intergalactic hero after her friend is abducted by an alien doomsday cult. Along the way, she rides a giant mouse, deals with humanoid chickens as well as robots, and makes friends with a blob-like creature."

According to Hatke, the character was actually created by his wife Anna while she was still in high school. When Hatke and Anna met in college, he began adapting the character into its present incarnation.

He continued developing the character in webcomics and then a short story titled "Zita the Spacegirl: If Wishes Were Socks," in the 2008 Random House anthology Flight Explorer.

Zita the Spacegirl debuted in 2011 with First Second Books. The second and third volumes appeared in 2012 and 2014.

In 2016, it was announced that Fox Animation had picked up the movie rights for the Zita trilogy; the films will be produced by Chernin Entertainment.

== Personal life ==
Hatke lives in Front Royal, Virginia, with his wife Anna and their five daughters. He is an avid player of role-playing games, as well as a practitioner of archery. He is also a fire-eater and amateur tumbler.

Hatke's daughter Ida died in an accident in 2019, at the age of four.

== Awards ==
- 2011 Cybils Award — Zita the Spacegirl
- 2016 Eisner Award for Best Publication for Early Readers (up to age 8) — Little Robot

== Bibliography ==
=== Graphic novels ===
- 2011 Zita the Spacegirl (First Second) ISBN 978-1596434462
- 2012 Legends of Zita the Spacegirl (First Second) ISBN 978-1596434479
- 2014 The Return of Zita the Spacegirl (First Second) ISBN 978-1596438767
- 2015 Little Robot (First Second) ISBN 978-1626720800
- 2016 Mighty Jack (First Second) ISBN 978-1626722644
- 2017 Mighty Jack and the Goblin King (First Second) ISBN 978-1626722668
- 2018 The Zita Trilogy Boxed Set (First Second) ISBN 978-1250180339
- 2019 Mighty Jack and Zita the Spacegirl (First Second) ISBN 978-1250191731
- 2023 Things in the Basement (First Second) ISBN 9781250909541

=== Children's books ===
- 2014 Julia’s House for Lost Creatures (First Second) ISBN 978-1596438668
- 2016 Nobody Likes a Goblin (First Second) ISBN 978-1626720817
- 2016 (by Ann M. Martin and Annie Parnell) Missy Piggle-Wiggle and the Whatever Cure
- 2017 (by Ann M. Martin and Annie Parnell) Missy Piggle-Wiggle and the Won't-Walk-the-Dog Cure
- 2018 (by Ann M. Martin and Annie Parnell) Missy Piggle-Wiggle and the Sticky-Fingers Cure
- 2020 Julia’s House Moves On (First Second) ISBN 978-1250191373
- 2021 Julia's House Goes Home (First Second), ISBN 978-1250769329

=== Adult books ===
- 2023 Reynard's Tale: A Story of Love and Mischief (First Second) ISBN 978-1250857910
