= Zongo Comics =

Defunct comics publisher

Zongo Comics "Zongo Comics are swell comics"
- Status: defunct, 1997
- Founded: 1995; 30 years ago
- Headquarters location: Los Angeles, California
- Key people: Mary Fleener; Gary Panter; Matt Groening
- Fiction genres: Alternative comics
- Owner(s): Bongo Comics

Zongo Comics was a comic book publisher. It was founded and published in 1995 by Simpsons and Futurama creator Matt Groening. Unlike its counterpart Bongo Comics, the comics published were geared towards grown-up audiences containing adult material and did not include any adaptations of Groening's cartoons. The only two titles in the Zongo Comics range were Gary Panter's Jimbo and Mary Fleener's Fleener.

Zongo Comics did not last as long as its sister group, and the range was cancelled after the series failed to attract a wide audience. Because the Zongo Jimbos were not very popular when they came out, Zongo/Bongo printed less of each issue. By issue #6, they only printed 500.

Because only ten Zongo Comics were ever published, they are well sought after by collectors due to their rarity.

== Publishing list ==
=== Jimbo ===
- (7 issues) created & written by Gary Panter

Gary Panter's graphic novel Jimbo in Purgatory (Fantagraphics, 2004) is thought of as #8 in this series but it was not published by Zongo.

The Museum of Contemporary Art, Los Angeles (MOCA) displayed Gary Panter's work, including his Jimbo series, as part of the "Masters of American Comics" exhibition. The exhibition was held from November 20, 2005, through March 12, 2006. The "Masters of American Comics" explored the rise of newspaper comic strips and comic books while considering their artistic development throughout the century.

Postcards of the covers of Gary Panter's Jimbo comics were available in the MOCA gift shop.

During the 1995 San Diego Comic-Con the Bongo Comics booth gave out three Zongo Comic 1-1/2" promo buttons.

1. Zongo Comics Logo
2. Jimbo – Red
3. Jimbo – Yellow

=== Fleener ===
- (3 issues) created & written by Mary Fleener
