= Geoffrey Hayes (artist) =

American illustrator and cartoonist

Geoffrey L. Hayes
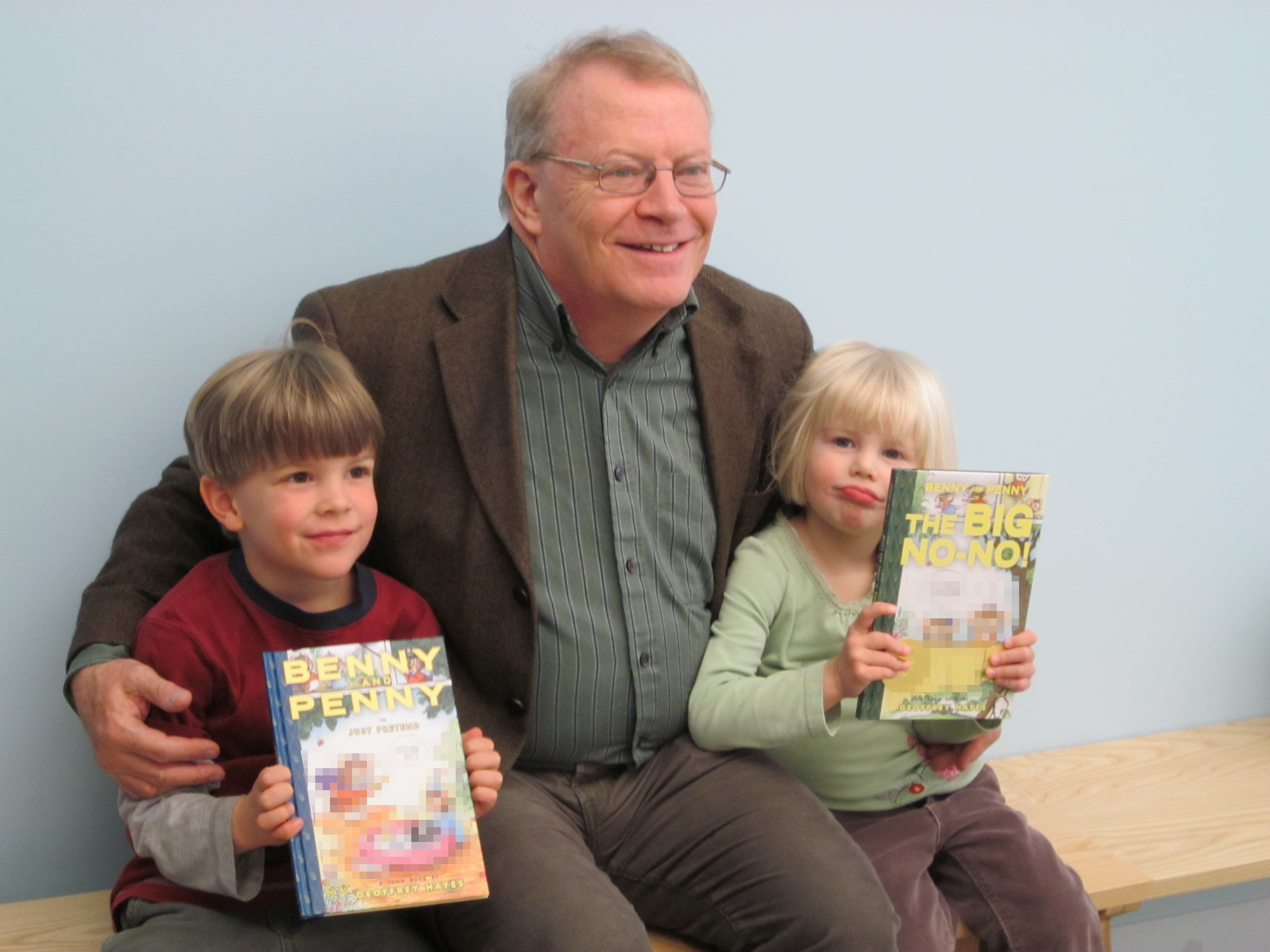
- Born: December 3, 1947; Pasadena, California, US
- Died: June 2, 2017 (aged 69); Asheville, North Carolina, US
- Occupations: Artist, illustrator, writer
- Relatives: Rory Hayes
- Writing career
- Genres: Children's literature, picture books, comics
- Notable awards: Theodor Seuss Geisel Award, 2010

Geoffrey L. Hayes (1947–2017) was an American children's book illustrator and cartoonist. He was the author of over 50 books, including a series of titles with the children's comics publisher Toon Books. He was the brother of underground cartoonist Rory Hayes (1949–1983).

== Biography ==
Growing up in San Francisco, Hayes moved homes frequently with his family; by the time he was twelve years old the family had moved ten times. Hayes and his younger brother were into pop culture and comic books, including Little Lulu, Uncle Scrooge, Sugar and Spike, and Dick Tracy. Together, they published homemade comics, which were encouraged by their mother. All through their teens the boys continued to make comics, home-made movies, and later, fanzines.

After high school, Hayes moved to New York City to pursue a career as an illustrator and cartoonist. He contributed to a few underground comix during this period (including Bogeyman and Arcade), mostly in collaboration with Rory, who was developing a reputation as a groundbreaking cartoonist in that genre.

Hayes died on June 2, 2017, of natural causes in Asheville, North Carolina at age 69.

== Awards ==
- 2012 Eisner Award for Best Publication for Early Readers (up to age 7) (nomination) for Patrick in a Teddy Bear's Picnic
- 2010 Theodor Seuss Geisel Award for Benny and Penny in the Big No-No!

== Bibliography (selected) ==
=== As author/illustrator ===
- Bear By Himself (Harper, 1976; re-issued in 1998 by Random House)
- The Alligator and His Uncle Tooth (HarperCollins, 1977)
- Patrick Takes A Bath (Knopf, 1984)
- Patrick Eats His Dinner (Knopf, 1984)
- Patrick Goes To Bed (Knopf, 1984)
- Patrick Buys A Coat (Knopf, 1984)
- The Mystery of the Pirate Ghost (Random House, 1985)
- The Secret of Foghorn Island (Random House, 1988)
- The Treasure of the Lost Lagoon (Random House, 1991)
- The Curse of the Cobweb Queen (Random House, 1994)
- The Night of the Circus Monsters (Random House, 1996)
- The Ants Go Marching (HarperCollins, 2000)
- Patrick and the Big Bully (Hyperion, 2001)
- Patrick at the Circus (Hyperion, 2002)
- A Night Light For Bunny (HarperCollins, 2004)
- Benny and Penny in Just Pretend (Raw Junior/Toon Books, 2008)
- Benny and Penny: The Big No-No! (Raw Junior/Toon Books, 2009)
- Benny and Penny in The Toy Breaker (Toon Books, 2010)
- Patrick in a Teddy Bear's Picnic (and Other Stories) (Toon Books, 2011)
- Benny and Penny in Lights Out! (Toon Books, 2012)
- Benny and Penny in Lost and Found (Toon Books, 2014)
- Benny and Penny in How to Say Goodbye (Toon Books, 2016)
- Lovo and the Firewolf (Fantagraphics, 2017)

=== As illustrator ===
- When the Wind Blew, by Margaret Wise Brown (HarperCollins, 1986)
- Thump and Plunk by Janice May Udry (HarperCollins, 2001)
- Brave Little Monster by Ken Baker (HarperCollins, 2001)

=== Underground comix ===
- Bogeyman #3 (Company & Sons, 1970)
- Arcade #6 (Print Mint, 1976) – p. 34 "AGE of REASON" & p. 48 "A FEAR of Froaks" (art by Rory Hayes [as R. Hayes]; story by Geoffrey Hayes)
