= Nadja Spiegelman =

American writer (born 1987)

- Born: May 13, 1987 (age 39)
- Occupations: writer, editor
- Parent(s): Art Spiegelman; Françoise Mouly
- Writing career
- Notable work: I'm Supposed to Protect You from All This

Nadja Spiegelman (born May 13, 1987) is an American writer and editor. She is the author of articles, books, and graphic novels, as well as a literary magazine editor.

== Early life, family and education ==
Nadja Spiegelman is the daughter of cartoonist Art Spiegelman (author of the graphic novel Maus) and Françoise Mouly (art editor of The New Yorker since 1993). She appears in several of Art Spiegelman's works: Maus is dedicated to her and (in later editions) her brother Dashiell Spiegelman, as well as her father's deceased brother, Richieu, and she plays a role in In the Shadow of No Towers, an autobiographical exploration of September 11. She attended Stuyvesant High School in downtown Manhattan.

== Career ==
Spiegelman is the author of I'm Supposed to Protect You from All This, a memoir about her mother, grandmother, and great-grandmother and the fallibility of memory. She has also co-written four graphic novels for children, Zig and Wikki in Something Ate My Homework, Zig and Wikki in The Cow, Lost in NYC: A Subway Adventure , and Blancaflor (a NYT top children's books of the year) under the TOON Books imprint.

In 2012, Nadja Spiegelman contributed to the creation of Blown Covers, Françoise Mouly's book of rejected New Yorker covers, and is listed as the associate editor. In advance of the book's publication, Spiegelman and Mouly launched a Blown Covers blog on Tumblr which ran until October 2012. On the blog, the mother-daughter team hosted weekly themed 'New Yorker' cover-style contests with prompts such as Mother's Day and the Trayvon Martin shooting. Artists submitted sketches, and 12 winners were posted every Friday along with editorial commentary by Mouly and Spiegelman. An image submitted through the website was published on the cover of The New Yorker in June 2012. As well as the contest, the blog also showcased images from the Mouly-Spiegelman archives, including old photographs and pages from Raw magazine and ran weekly artist spotlights.

In 2016, Nadja Spiegelman and Francoise Mouly launched Resist!, a publication of political comics and graphics by mostly female artists, conceived as a reaction to the election of Donald Trump as president. They created a website with an open call for submissions, similar to the method used to promote Blown Covers. The first issue, in the form of a tabloid newspaper, was printed at 60,000 copies and given away for free at protests of Donald Trump's inauguration across the United States. Their 96-page second issue was published in the summer of 2017. Nadja Spiegelman received a 2017 MacDowell Colony Fellowship.

Spiegelman was the Online Editor of The Paris Review (2017–20), where she is credited with expanding its reach with new essays and columns on poetry and feminism, in addition to adding such noted writers as Sabrina Orah Mark, Hanif Abdurraqib, Tash Aw, Nina MacLaughlin, Meghan O'Gieblyn, and Elisa Gabbert.

In 2020, Spiegelman was announced as the editor-in-chief of a new international print literary magazine, Astra Magazine. It folded after 2 issues. She was then founding editor of Metrograph's print cinema magazine.

As of August 2025, Spiegelman joined the New York Times Opinion team as a culture editor.
