= Liniers (cartoonist) =

Argentine cartoonist

Ricardo Siri
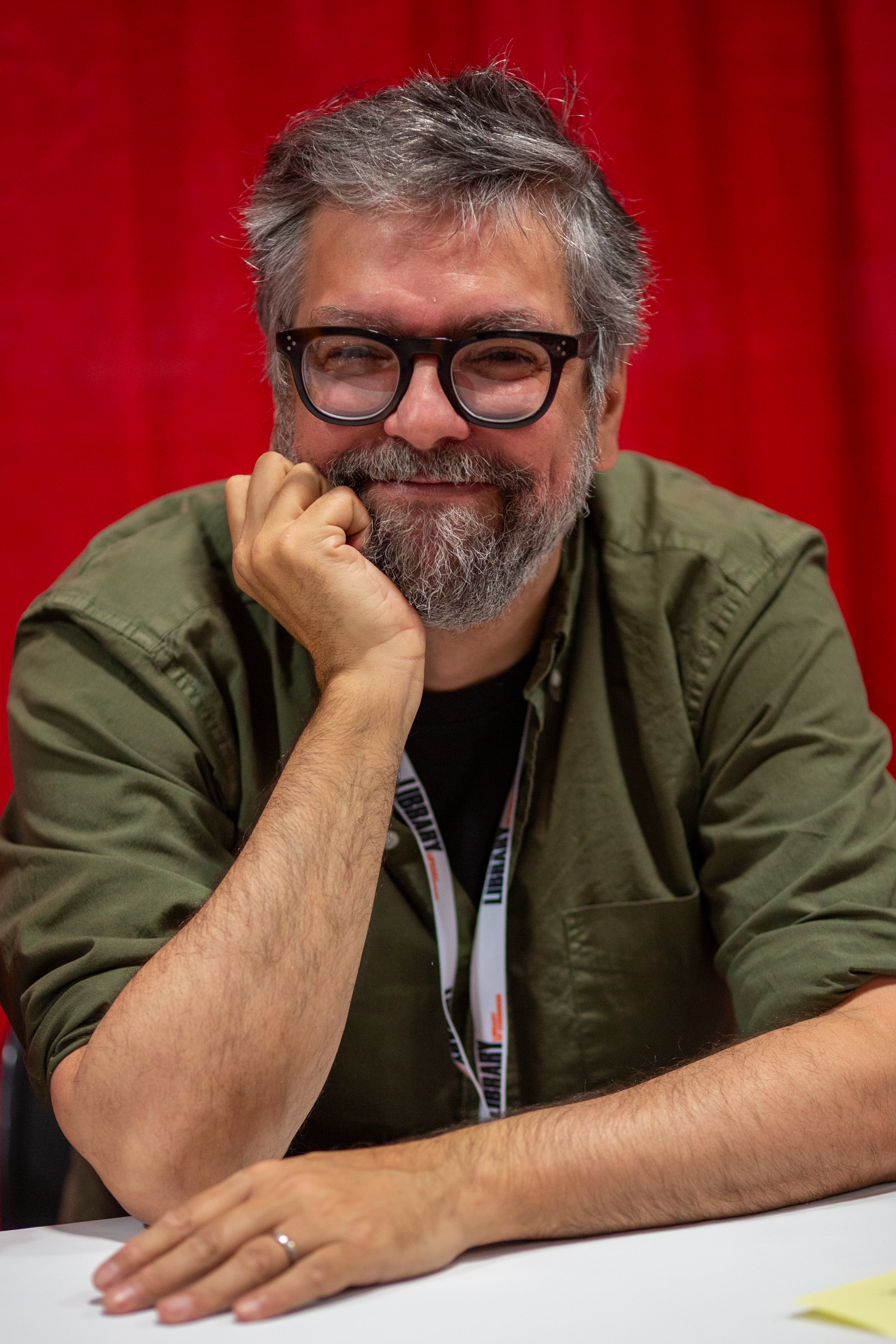
- Liniers in 2024
- Born: November 15, 1973 (age 53) Buenos Aires, Argentina
- Area: Cartoonist
- Pseudonym: Liniers
- Notable works: Macanudo The Big Wet Balloon
- Awards: Eisner Award Winner. Parents Magazine Ten Best Children's Book (for The Big Wet Balloon)

Ricardo Siri (Buenos Aires, November 15, 1973), better known by the name Liniers, is an Argentine cartoonist.

== Early life ==
Liniers is related to viceroy Santiago de Liniers. He began drawing from a very early age; he has remarked that he began to draw in order to enjoy movies at home. "I wanted to have Star Wars and the only way to have it was to draw it. So we could look at it whenever we wanted to." His father was a lawyer and his mother worked at various jobs, including making slippers and little paintings. He has two younger siblings and is married to the writer Angie Erhardt del Campo. They have three daughters named Matilda, Clementina, and Emma.

== Career ==
In regards to the name he uses for his comic strips, Liniers has remarked: "Liniers is my second name. In Buenos Aires there was a viceroy named Liniers, who ended up being executed by firing squad. He was my ancestor, something like a greatgreatgreatgrandfather. So when I began to sign my comic strips, I used the name, because I like it when things don't have names appropriate to what they are – for example, the teddy bear in my comic strip is called Madariaga [which is usually a surname]. Who has ever heard of a teddy bear with such a name? I thought that such an absurd name had to be worth something."

He studied advertising, but ultimately decided to pursue a career in comics. His work is influenced by Patrick McDonnell, Hergé, Goscinny and Uderzo, Quino, Héctor Germán Oesterheld and Francisco Solano López, Charles Schulz and George Herriman. He started working in fanzines, then moved on to magazines and newspapers. His work has been featured in Lugares, ¡Suélteme!, Hecho en Buenos Aires, Calles, Zona de Obras, Consecuencias y ¡Qué suerte! (España), Olho Mágico (Brazil), 9-11 Artists respond (USA), and Comix 2000 (France).

Along with Santiago Rial Ungaro, Liniers published Warhol para principiantes (Warhol for beginners), for Ediciones Era Naciente in 2001.

Liniers appeared as a presenter at the second Pecha Kucha night in Buenos Aires, October 3, 2006.

In September 1999 he started publishing a weekly strip called Bonjour in NO!, a supplement of Página/12. Bonjour is very experimental and features some adult language, and showcases many characters that would reappear in later works. Bonjour appeared for the last time on June 27, 2002.

In June 2002, fellow cartoonist Maitena got him into the Argentine newspaper La Nación, where he began a new daily strip called Macanudo, which appears on the last page of the paper. Just like Bonjour, Macanudo is very experimental and deals with meta humor. Since September 2018, the strip is distributed in English by King Features Syndicate.

Four volumes of Macanudo have been translated into English by Mara Faye Lethem and published in the United States by Enchanted Lion Books; after being syndicated, the collected strips have been published by Fantagraphics.

Conejo de viaje (Travelling Rabbit or Rabbit on the Road) (2008) is a collection of illustrated travel journals that describe his journeys through France, Portugal, Germany, Spain, Argentina, and Antarctica (which includes sojourns on Antarctic islands such as Cuverville Island).

The Big Wet Balloon, a TOON Book (El Globo Grande y Mojado) (Pub date: Sept 10, 2013) is the first book by Liniers published in the U.S. In 2014 the artist illustrated some covers for The New Yorker

== Bibliography ==
- Macanudo Nº1 (April 2004)
- Macanudo Nº2 (April 2005)
- Bonjour (December 2005)
- Macanudo Nº3 (April 2006)
- Macanudo Nº4 (December 2006)
- Cuadernos 1985-2005 (December 2006)
- Lo que hay antes de que haya algo (June 2007) – children's book (English: What there is before there is anything there)
- Macanudo Nº5 (October 2007)
- Macanudo Nº6 (2008)
- Conejo de viaje (2008) – (English: Travelling Rabbit or Rabbit on the Road)
- Oops! (2008), joint work with Kevin Johansen
- El Macanudo Universal - Vols. 1-5 (2009)
- Macanudo Nº7 (2009)
- Macanudismo (2010)
- Macanudo Nº8 (2010)
- Macanudo Nº9 (2012)
- Macanudo Nº10 (2013)
- El Globo Grande y Mojado and The Big Wet Balloon, a TOON Book (TOON Books/Candlewick Press, September 2013) – picture book in simultaneous Spanish and English-language editions
- Escrito y Dibujado por Enriqueta (TOON, 2015), LCCN 2015-4011; Written and Drawn by Henrietta (TOON, 2015), LCCN 2015-4010 – English translation by Liniers, one runner-up for the 2016 Batchelder Award
- Macanudo Nº11 (2015)
- Macanudo Nº12 (2016)
- Macanudo Nº13 (2017)
- Buenas Noches, Planeta (2017); Good Night, Planet – Winner of the 2018 Eisner Award for Best Publication for Early Readers (up to age 8).
- Wildflowers: A TOON Book. New York: TOON Books. 2021.
- Macanudo: Welcome to Elsewhere (Fantagraphics, 2022)
- Macanudo: Optimism Is for the Brave (Fantagraphics, 2023)
- Macanudo: The Way of the Penguin (Fantagraphics, 2024)

=== Albums ===
- Logo by Kevin Johansen
- La Lengua Popular by Andrés Calamaro – for which Liniers won the Gardel Prize for best cover art
