= Gary Panter =

American artist (born 1950)

- Born: December 1, 1950 (age 75) Durant, Oklahoma, U.S.
- Areas: Cartoonist, Writer, Artist
- Pseudonym: Gars Panter
- Notable works: Jimbo; Pee-wee's Playhouse set designs
- Awards: Firecracker Alternative Book Award, 1999; Inkpot Award, 2005; American Book Award, 2007; Klein Award, 2012; Daytime Emmy Award (x2)

Gary Panter (born December 1, 1950) is an American cartoonist, illustrator, painter, designer and part-time musician. Panter's work is representative of the post-underground, new wave comics movement that began with the end of Arcade: The Comics Revue and the initiation of RAW, one of the main instigators of American alternative comics. The Comics Journal has called Panter the "Greatest Living Cartoonist".

Panter has published his work in various magazines and newspapers, including Time and Rolling Stone, and in notable comics anthologies such as Raw, BLAB!, Zero Zero, Anarchy Comics, Weirdo, Kramers Ergot, and Young Lust. He has exhibited widely, and won two Daytime Emmy Awards for his set designs for Pee-wee's Playhouse. His most notable works include Jimbo: Adventures in Paradise, Jimbo's Inferno, and Facetasm, the latter of which was created together with Charles Burns (and which won a Firecracker Alternative Book Award).

== Early life and education ==
Panter was born in Durant, Oklahoma, and grew up in Brownsville, Texas, and Sulphur Springs, Texas. He attended East Texas State University, where he studied under Jack Unruh and Lee Baxter Davis, and became part of the group of artists known as "The Lizard Cult."

== Career ==
=== Early work and punk scene ===
As an early participant in the Los Angeles punk scene in the 1970s, Panter drew for the punk fanzine Slash and designed numerous record covers.

=== Jimbo and comics ===
Panter created Jimbo, his punk everyman, in 1974. Jimbo embodies elements of Jack Kirby and Picasso. The character was a regular feature in Slash, Raw, and has been featured in his own comic book series and several graphic novels.

Panter's good friend Matt Groening said of Jimbo, "He and his friends are always up against systems of control... Jimbo is a wild combo-platter of brilliant drawing and stuff you didn't know could be done with mere pen and ink." Groening has also stated that Jimbo's spiky hair inspired the design of Bart Simpson.

Jimbo in Purgatory (Fantagraphics, 2004) and Jimbo's Inferno (Fantagraphics, 2006) are graphic novels combining classical literature, particularly Dante's Divine Comedy, with pop and punk culture sensibilities. Jimbo's Inferno received an American Book Award in 2007.

=== Rozz Tox and graphic novels ===
In 1979, Panter's Rozz Tox Manifesto was published in the Ralph Records catalog, advocating for artists to engage the capitalist system. He also collaborated with Jay Cotton on Pee-Dog: The Shit Generation for the Church of the SubGenius.

Panter continued to publish alternative comics and graphic novels, including Cola Madnes and contributions to the avant-garde magazine RAW.

=== Pee-wee's Playhouse and set design ===
In the 1980s, Panter became the set designer for the children's television show Pee-wee's Playhouse. His densely layered, chaotic sets broke with the simplified, pastel look then standard in children's television. He won two Daytime Emmy Awards for his work on the show.

=== Later projects and publications ===
Panter created the online series Pink Donkey for Cartoon Network.

In 2008, PictureBox published Gary Panter, a two-volume, 700-page retrospective including sketches and previously unpublished material.

In 2010, the French publisher United Dead Artists released two volumes of his work: The Wrong Box and The Land Unknown.

In 2025, Desert Island's Eisner-nominated comics and art tabloid Smoke Signal published a solo issue of original work entitled "Flycatcher". It was the first time in the publication's 44-issue history than an artist drew an entire issue cover-to-cover.

== Use by music artists ==
Warner Bros. Records commissioned Panter to paint the album covers for the unauthorized releases of Frank Zappa's albums Studio Tan (1978), Sleep Dirt and Orchestral Favorites (1979).

In 2006, one of Panter's paintings was used as the cover art for Yo La Tengo's album I Am Not Afraid of You and I Will Beat Your Ass.

== Personal life ==
From 1978 to 1986, Panter was married to writer Nicole Panter, who was the manager of Los Angeles punk rock band the Germs. He was married to art director Helene Silverman from 1989 to 2016. In 2026, Panter wed animation creator Lizz Hickey.

== Style ==
Panter was influenced by, among others, Frank Zappa's art director Cal Schenkel. His comics are fast and hard, drawn in an expressionistic style. His work spans painting, commercial art, illustration, cartoons, alternative comix, and music.

== Exhibitions ==
With Winsor McCay, Lyonel Feininger, George Herriman, Elzie Segar, Frank King, Chester Gould, Milton Caniff, Charles Schulz, Will Eisner, Jack Kirby, Harvey Kurtzman, Robert Crumb, Art Spiegelman and Chris Ware, Panter was among the artists honored in the exhibition "Masters of American Comics" at the Jewish Museum in New York City, from September 16, 2006, to January 28, 2007.

An exhibition of originals of Gary Panter's drawings and paintings was shown at the Phoenix Art Museum from April 21 through August 19, 2007. An exhibition of paintings was at the Dunn and Brown Contemporary Gallery in Dallas in October 2007.

== Awards and honors ==
Panter was the recipient of the 2012 Klein Award, which was given by the Museum of Comic and Cartoon Art at their annual MoCCA Art Festival in New York.

== Bibliography ==
- Hup. Los Angeles: self-published. 1977. OCLC 1333461698.
- The Asshole: A Parable. self-published. 1979, minicomic.
- Okupant X. Providence, R.I.: Diana's Bimonthly Press. 1979. OCLC 6646685.
- Dal Tokyo. Seattle: Fantagraphics Books. 1983.
- Invasion of the Elvis Zombies. New York: Raw Books. 1984. ISBN 978-0-915043-01-9.
- Facetasm: H Simulated and Real. Richmond, VA: Gates of Heck. 1992. OCLC 27892532, with Charles Burns.
- Cola Madnes. Funny Garbage. 2000. ISBN 978-0-9701626-0-1.
- 100.1: Drawings by Gary Panter. Brooklyn: Plywood Press. 2004. ISBN 978-0-9763102-0-4.
- Satiro-Plastic: The Sketchbook of Gary Panter. Montreal: Drawn and Quarterly. 2005. ISBN 978-1-896597-86-7.
- Hey Dork!: The Sketchbook of Gary Panter. Montreal: Drawn and Quarterly. 2007. ISBN 978-1-894937-88-7.
- McMullen, Brian (2008). Gary Panter. Brooklyn: PictureBox. ISBN 978-0-9794153-1-9.
- The Land Unknown. Galerie Martel. 2009.
- Songy of Paradise. Seattle: Fantagraphics. 2017. ISBN 978-1-68396-028-7.
- Crashpad. Seattle: Fantagraphics. 2021. ISBN 978-1-68396-416-2.

=== Jimbo ===
- Raw One-Shot Edition No. 1: Jimbo. Raw Books. 1982.
- Jimbo: Adventures in Paradise. New York: Pantheon Books. 1988. ISBN 978-0-394-75639-4. mostly a collection of strips that originally appeared in Slash, the Los Angeles Reader, and Raw; reissued by New York Review Books in 2021.
- Jimbo (issues #1–7). Zongo Comics. 1995–1997.
- Jimbo in Purgatory. Seattle: Fantagraphics. 2004. ISBN 978-1-56097-572-4.
- Jimbo's Inferno. Seattle: Fantagraphics. 2006. ISBN 978-1-56097-691-2.
