= Barbara McClintock (illustrator) =

American writer

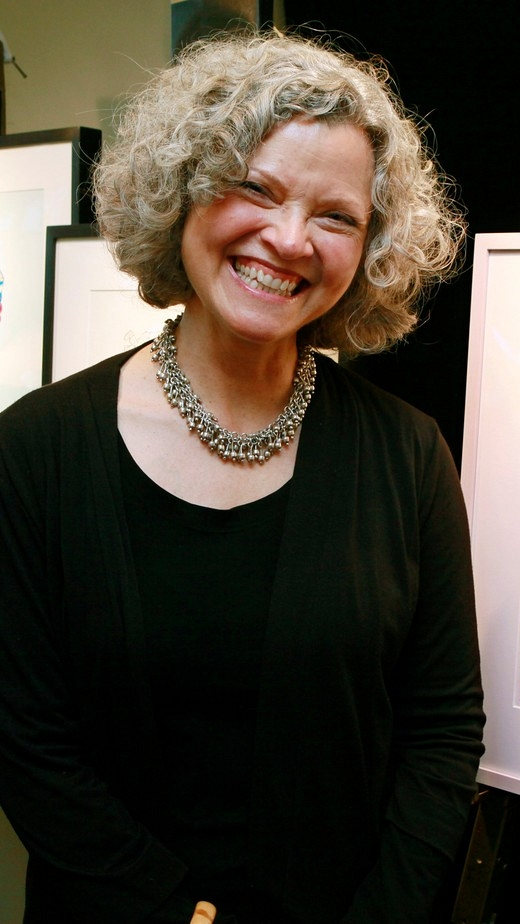
- McClintock in 2011, posing at an event in New York.
- Born: May 6, 1955 (age 71); Flemington, New Jersey
- Occupations: Writer and illustrator
- Writing career
- Genre: Children's literature
- Website: www.barbaramcclintockbooks.com

Barbara McClintock (born May 6, 1955) is an American illustrator and author of children's books.

== Background ==
McClintock was born in Flemington, New Jersey, on May 6, 1955, and spent her early childhood in Clinton, New Jersey. She moved to North Dakota with her mother and sister when she was nine years old.

After attending Jamestown College in Jamestown, North Dakota, she moved to New York City a week following her 20th birthday on the recommendation of Maurice Sendak, whom she called to ask advice about how to become a children's book illustrator. She studied briefly at the Art Students League of New York.

McClintock worked for Jim Henson illustrating books for his Fraggle Rock cable television series early in her career.

Her books have won numerous awards, including four New York Times Book Review Best Illustrated Books, a Boston Globe/Horn Book Honor award (2003, for Dahlia ), two Time magazine Best Books, eight New York Public Library 100 Recommended Books, a Golden Kite award, two Parents Choice, an ALA Notable Book, a NEBA, starred reviews in Publishers Weekly, SLJ, Kirkus and Horn Book. The Minneapolis Children's Theatre made a ballet/opera of her book Animal Fables From Aesop, originally published in 1991 by David R. Godine, Publisher.
