= Raw (comics magazine) =

Comics anthology edited by Art Spiegelman and Françoise Mouly

- Cover to Raw volume 1, #1 (July 1980), art by Art Spiegelman

Publication information
- Publisher: Raw Books & Graphics (1980–1986); Penguin Books (1989–1991)
- Schedule: Annually
- Format: Ongoing series
- Genre: Alternative
- Publication date: July 1980 – 1991
- No. of issues: 11
- Editor(s): Art Spiegelman; Françoise Mouly

Raw was a comics anthology edited by Art Spiegelman and Françoise Mouly and published in the United States by Mouly from 1980 to 1991. It was a flagship publication of the 1980s alternative comics movement, serving as a more intellectual counterpoint to Robert Crumb's visceral Weirdo, which followed squarely in the underground tradition of Zap and Arcade. Along with the more genre-oriented Heavy Metal, it was also one of the main venues for European comics in the United States in its day.

== Publication history ==
=== Origins ===
Spiegelman has often described the reasoning and process that led Mouly to start the magazine. After the demise of Arcade, the '70s underground comix anthology he co-edited with Bill Griffith, and the general waning of the underground scene, Spiegelman despaired that comics for adults might fade away for good. He had sworn not to work on another magazine where he would be editing his peers because of the tension and jealousies involved, but Mouly had her own reasons for wanting to do just that. Having set up her small publishing company, Raw Books & Graphics, in 1977, she envisioned a magazine encompassing the range of her graphic and literary interests as a more attractive prospect than publishing a series of books. Spiegelman finally agreed on New Year's Eve 1979 to co-edit. The magazine was to provide an outlet for the kinds of comics that had difficulty finding a publisher in the US, in particular younger cartoonists who fit neither the superhero nor the underground mold, and European cartoonists who did not fit the sex-and-sci-fi appetites of Heavy Metal fans.

At the time, large-format, graphic punk and New Wave design magazines like Wet were distributed in independent bookstores. Mouly had earlier installed a printing press in her and Spiegelman's fourth floor walk-up Soho loft and experimented with different bindings and printing techniques. Mouly's approach was hands-on, and she gave great attention to every step of the printing process. She and Spiegelman eventually settled on a very bold, large-scale and upscale package. Calling Raw a "graphix magazine", they hoped their unprecedented approach would bypass readers' prejudices against comics and force them to look at the work with new eyes.

=== Volume 1 ===
In the midst of a commercial and artistic fallow period in the American comics industry, the lavishly printed, 10 1/2 in × 14 1/8 in (27 cm × 36 cm) first issue of Raw appeared in July 1980. Its production values resulted in a $3.50 cover price, several times the going prices for comics, either mainstream or underground.

The first eight issues of Raw (Volume 1), published by Mouly and co-edited by Mouly and Spiegelman, were printed in black-and-white in an enormous, doormat-sized magazine format with a stapled binding. The physicality of Raw was evident in each issue: tipped-in plates, bubblegum cards, and torn covers were part of the aesthetic of the magazine, accomplished by hand by Mouly, Spiegelman, and friends at gatherings after the printing of a new issue.

For example, one issue came with "City of Terror" trading cards and gum; another issue contained a flexi disc with a sound collage made from excerpts of Ronald Reagan's speeches; a third issue had a corner torn off the cover, with the missing corner from a different copy taped inside.

In 1987 Pantheon Books published a book collection of pieces from the first three issues titled Read Yourself Raw.

=== Volume 2 ===
The final three issues of Raw (Volume 2) were printed in a "digest" or "paperback" format with a mixture of full-color and black-and-white pages, some of which were printed on differing paper stock. They featured longer stories that focused more on narrative than bold graphic experiments. These issues were published by Penguin Books.

In 1991, Mouly and Spiegelman published the final issue of Raw, which was no longer a small, hands-on operation, nor was it something they still thought necessary, as the artists then had a range of publishing outlets that had not existed when Raw first saw the light of day.

== Contents ==
Among the comics the first issue contained was the only strip Mouly herself was to produce, "Industry News and Review No. 6", an autobiographical strip in which she contemplates her late-1970s anxieties and thoughts of suicide. Other strips in the eclectic anthology included an example of the early 20th-century newspaper strip Dream of the Rarebit Fiend by Winsor McCay, and an excerpt from Manhattan by contemporary French cartoonist Jacques Tardi.

As an editor, Mouly was hands-on, suggesting ideas and changes — an approach considered anathema to the editor-averse underground spirit, but artists welcomed her input as in the end she did not interfere with their autonomy.

Raw featured a mix of American and European contributors (including some of Spiegelman's students at the School of Visual Arts), as well as various contributors from other parts of the world, including the Argentine duo of José Antonio Muñoz and Carlos Sampayo, the Congolese painter Chéri Samba, and several Japanese cartoonists known for their work in Garo. Each issue contained a broad variety of styles linked by a common theme, be it urban despair, suicide, or a vision of America through foreign eyes.

To comics academic Jeet Heer, Raw was "a singular mixture of visual diversity and thematic unity".

The best-known work to run in Raw was a serialization of Spiegelman's (eventual) Pulitzer Prize–winning graphic novel Maus, which ran as an insert for the duration of the magazine from the December 1980 second issue.

Individual chapters were packaged as small comic books bound within each issue of Raw Volume 1; starting with Raw Volume 2 (a few color comics, such as Spiegelman's "Two-Fisted Painters: The Matisse Falcon" and Yoshiharu Tsuge's "Red Flowers", were also packaged as inserts). By Volume 2 Raw's own dimensions had shrunk to match those of Maus.

Although comics were the main focus, many issues included galleries of non-comics illustration and illustrated prose or non-fiction pieces; for example, Raw Volume 2, #2 featured one of the earliest published articles on Henry Darger, complete with fold-out color reproductions of his paintings and diaries. Raw also frequently reprinted public domain works by cartoonists and illustrators of historical significance such as George Herriman, Gustave Doré, and Winsor McCay.

== Issues ==
Volume 1

- #1 (July 1980): "The Graphix Magazine of Postponed Suicides"
- #2 (December 1980): "The Graphix Magazine for Damned Intellectuals"
- #3 (July 1981): "The Graphix Magazine That Lost Its Faith in Nihilism"
- #4 (March 1982): "The Graphix Magazine for Your Bomb Shelter's Coffee Table"
- #5 (March 1983): "The Graphix Magazine of Abstract Depressionism"
- #6 (May 1984): "The Graphix Magazine That Overestimates the Taste of the American Public"
- #7 (May 1985): "The Torn-Again Graphix Magazine"
- #8 (September 1986): "The Graphic Aspirin for War Fever"

Volume 2

- #1 (1989): "Open Wounds from the Cutting Edge of Commix" (ISBN 9780140122657)
- #2 (1990): "Required Reading for the Post-Literate" (ISBN 9780140122817)
- #3 (1991): "High Culture for Lowbrows" (ISBN 9780140122824)

=== Notable works published in Raw ===
- Maus by Art Spiegelman
- "Here" by Richard McGuire
- "The Boulevard of Broken Dreams" by Kim Deitch

== Contributors ==
Notable Raw alumni include:

- Lynda Barry
- Mark Beyer
- Charles Burns
- Sue Coe
- Robert Crumb
- Kim Deitch
- Julie Doucet
- Justin Green
- Bill Griffith
- Fletcher Hanks (posthumous)
- Kamagurka & Herr Seele
- Ben Katchor
- Kaz
- Krystine Kryttre
- Jacques Loustal
- Richard McGuire
- Javier Mariscal
- Francis Masse
- Lorenzo Mattotti
- Ever Meulen
- Alan Moore
- Jerry Moriarty
- Françoise Mouly
- José Muñoz
- Mark Newgarden
- Gary Panter
- Chéri Samba
- Robert Sikoryak
- Edward Sorel
- Art Spiegelman
- Joost Swarte
- Jacques Tardi
- Yoshiharu Tsuge
- Chris Ware

== Reception ==
Raw had a strong critical reception, and also sold surprisingly well. It was also not without its critics, who charged it with being highbrow and elitist, or claimed it to be a one-man Spiegelman show.

Pioneer underground cartoonist Robert Crumb responded in 1981 with the magazine Weirdo, intended to remain free of editorial intrusion and stay true to comics' lowbrow roots.

== Spin-offs ==
Several solo books by Raw contributors were published with the subtitle "A Raw One-Shot". Other solo books were labeled "A Raw Book".

In 2000, Mouly started a Raw Junior division and launched the Little Lit series. These hardcover anthologies of children's comics were published by HarperCollins/Joanna Cotler Books, and featured work by some of Raw's most famous contributors as well as established children's book artists such as Maurice Sendak and Ian Falconer.

In the spring of 2008, Mouly's Raw Junior division launched the first Toon Books. This collection of 6" × 9" hardcover comics for children claimed to be the first time anyone had published comics specifically for young children learning to read, and brought Mouly (together with Spiegelman, who was an advisor) full-circle back to her roots as a small publisher, confirming her as one of comics' most persistent groundbreakers.

== See also ==
- Rip Off Comix
