= Charles Burns (cartoonist) =

American cartoonist and illustrator

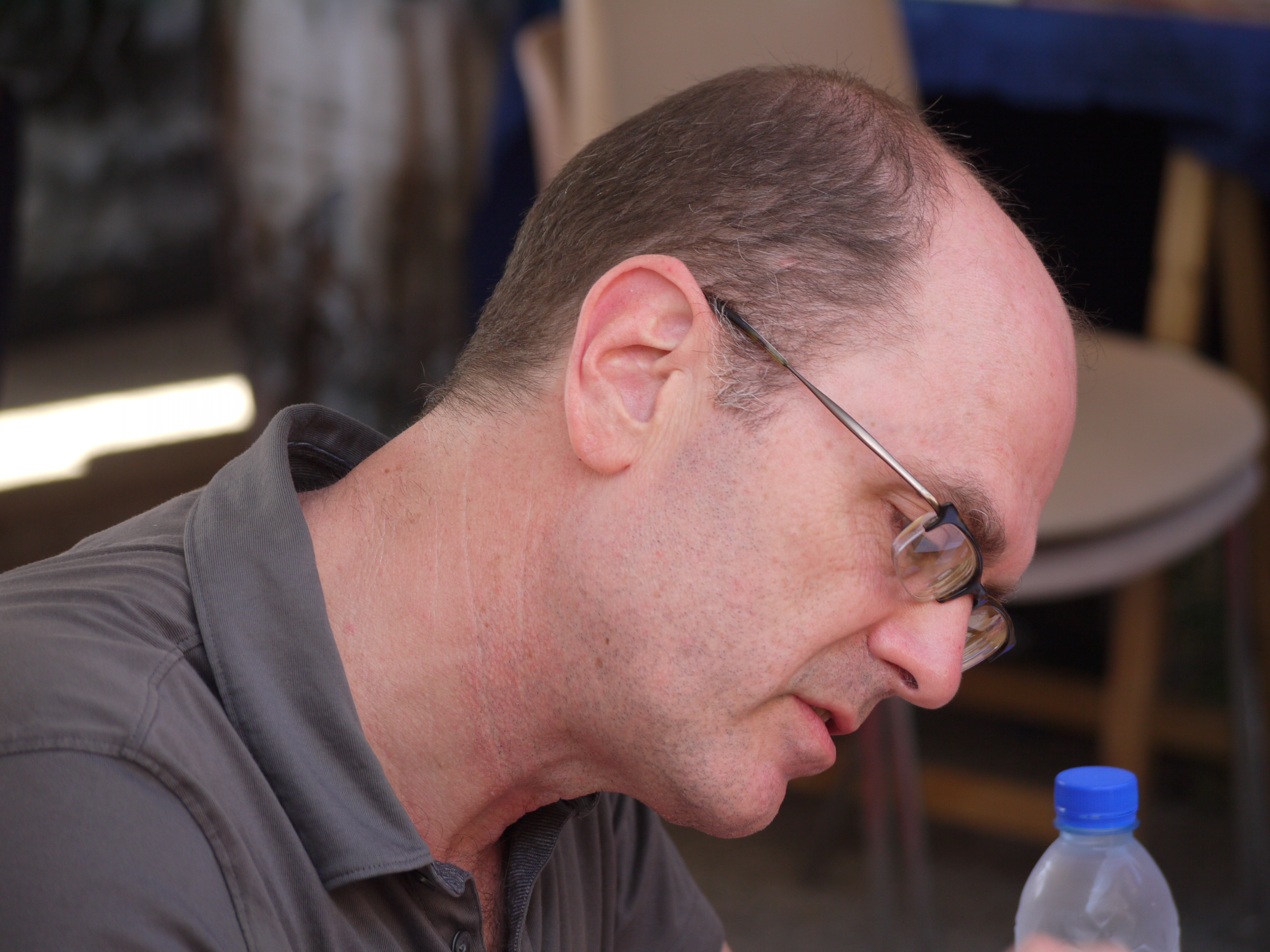
- Charles Burns at the 2009 Comic Strip Festival of Sollies Ville, France, 2009
- Born: September 27, 1955 (age 71) Washington, D.C., US
- Areas: Cartoonist, Writer, Artist
- Notable works: Black Hole

Daniel Clowes and Charles Burns discuss their careers in 2016

Charles Burns (born September 27, 1955) is an American cartoonist and illustrator. His early work was published in a Sub Pop fanzine, and he achieved prominence in the early issues of RAW. His graphic novel Black Hole won the Harvey Award.

== Career ==
=== Comics ===
Charles Burns's earliest works include illustrations for the Sub Pop fanzine, and Another Room Magazine of Oakland, but he came to prominence when his comics were published for the first time in early issues of RAW, the avant-garde comics magazine founded in 1980 by Françoise Mouly and Art Spiegelman. In 1982, Burns did a die-cut cover for RAW #4. Raw Books also published two books of Burns as RAW One-Shots: Big Baby and Hard-Boiled Defective Stories. In 1994, he was awarded a Pew Fellowship. In 1999, he showed at the Pennsylvania Academy of the Fine Arts.

Most of Burns's short stories, published in various outlets over the decades, were later collected in the three volumes of the "Charles Burns Library" (hardcovers from Fantagraphics Books): El Borbah (1999), Big Baby (2000), and Skin Deep (2001). (A fourth and last volume, Bad Vibes, has yet to be published, which would have the Library collecting the entirety of his pre-Black Hole comics work. It was later stated that Burns did not feel there was enough material for a complete fourth volume.)

From 1993 to 2004, he serialized the 12 chapters of his Harvey Award-winning graphic novel Black Hole (12 issues from Kitchen Sink Press and Fantagraphics Books). The series was collected into a single volume in 2005. Black Hole was featured prominently in the film Dawn of the Planet of the Apes.

In 2007 Burns contributed material for the French made animated horror anthology Fear(s) of the Dark.

In October 2010, Burns released the first part of a new series, X'ed Out. Part two of the new trilogy, The Hive, was released in October 2012. Sugar Skull, the final installment in the trilogy, was released Fall of 2014. The series was collected into a single volume, Last Look, published by Pantheon in 2016.

He won the 2025 Eisner Award for Best Writer/Artist for Kommix, Final Cut, and Unwholesome Love.

=== Illustration ===
Burns's high-profile illustrations include album cover work for the Iggy Pop album Brick by Brick. His art was also licensed by The Coca-Cola Company to illustrate product and advertising material for their failed OK Soda product. More recently, he has worked on advertising campaigns for Altoids and portrait illustrations for The Believer. In the early 1990s, his Dogboy stories were adapted by MTV as a live-action serial for Liquid Television. In 1991, choreographer Mark Morris commissioned him to create illustrations that were then used as a basis for his version of Tchaikovsky's The Nutcracker, The Hard Nut. Burns's style was a source of inspiration for Martin Ander's artwork for Fever Ray, Karin Dreijer Andersson's solo project.

== Publications ==
=== Comics and graphic novels ===
- 1985 Big Baby (Raw Books & Graphics) ISBN 0915043033
- 1988 Hardboiled Defective Stories (Pantheon Books) ISBN 0394754417
- 1991 Curse of the Molemen (Kitchen Sink Press) ISBN 0878161341
- 1992 Blood Club (Kitchen Sink Press) ISBN 0878161791
- 1993 Modern Horror Sketchbook (Kitchen Sink Press) ISBN 087816250X
- 1995 Black Hole 1 (Kitchen Sink Press) ISBN 978-0878163373
- 1995 Black Hole 2 (Kitchen Sink Press) ISBN 978-1606990308
- 1996 Black Hole 3 (Kitchen Sink Press)
- 1997 Black Hole 4 (Kitchen Sink Press)
- 1998 Black Hole 5 (Fantagraphics Books)
- 1998 Black Hole 6 (Fantagraphics Books) ISBN 978-1606990315
- 1999 El Borbah (Fantagraphics Books) ISBN 1560973269
- 2000 Big Baby (Fantagraphics Books) ISBN 1560973617
- 2000 Black Hole 7 (Fantagraphics Books) ISBN 978-1606990322
- 2000 Black Hole 8 (Fantagraphics Books) ISBN 978-1606990339
- 2001 Skin Deep: Tales of Doomed Romance (Fantagraphics Books) ISBN 1560973900
- 2001 Black Hole 9 (Fantagraphics Books) ISBN 978-1606990346
- 2002 Black Hole 10 (Fantagraphics Books) ISBN 978-1606990292
- 2003 Black Hole 11 (Fantagraphics Books)
- 2004 Black Hole 12 (Fantagraphics Books)
  - 2005 Black Hole (Pantheon Books) ISBN 978-0375714726; collects Black Hole 1-12
- 2010 X'ed Out (Pantheon Books) ISBN 978-0307379139
- 2012 The Hive (Pantheon Books) ISBN 978-0307907882
- 2014 Sugar Skull (Pantheon Books) ISBN 978-0307907905
  - 2016 Last Look (Pantheon Books) ISBN 978-0375715174; collects X'ed Out, The Hive and Sugar Skull
- 2019 Dédales (Cornélius, France) ISBN 978-2360811649
- 2019 Free S**t (Fantagraphics Books) ISBN 9781683962601
- 2021 Dédales 2 (Cornélius, France) ISBN 978-2360811892
- 2023 Dédales 3 (Cornélius, France) ISBN 978-2360812080
  - 2024 Final Cut (Pantheon Books) ISBN 978-0593701706; collects Dédales, Dédales 2 and Dédales 3
- 2024 Kommix (Fantagraphics Books) ISBN 9781683969570
- 2024 Unwholesome Love (co-published with Partners and Son)

=== Illustration books ===
- 1998 Facetasm, Green Candy Press (in collaboration with Gary Panter) — winner of a 1999 Firecracker Alternative Book Award
- 2007 One Eye (Pantheon Books) ISBN 978-1897299043
- Permagel, United Dead Artists, French A3 sized publication in black and white
- Love Nest, Éditions Cornélius, hardcover
- Vortex, Éditions Cornélius, hardcover, full color
- Johnny 23, Le Dernier Cri

=== Prints ===
- 1990 Defective Stories (A.P.A.A.R, France)

== Sources ==
- Charles Burns page at Fantagraphics - Books in print from this publisher.
- Brian Heater, "Interview: Charles Burns Pt. 1", The Daily Cross Hatch, (November 10, 2008).
- "I'm Slowly Learning to Draw Every Human Being in the United States," Interview with Hillary Chute, The Believer, January 2008
