= Françoise Mouly =

French-born American editor, designer and publisher (born 1955)

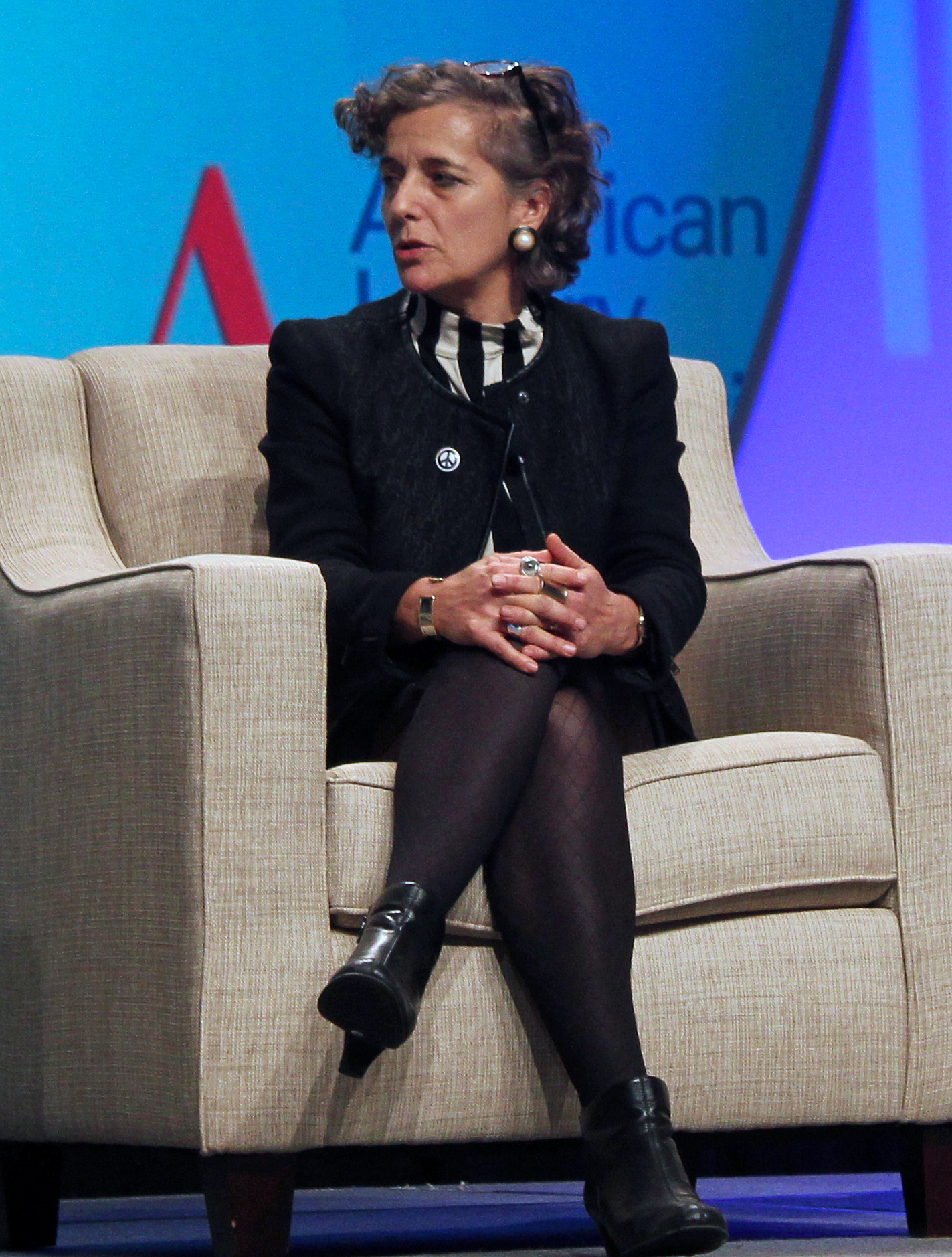
- Mouly in 2015
- Born: 24 October 1955 (age 71); Paris, France
- Occupations: Publisher; editor; designer; colorist
- Known for: Raw; Raw Books; Toon Books
- Spouse: Art Spiegelman (m. 1977)
- Children: Nadja Spiegelman; Dashiell Spiegelman
- Awards: French Knight of the Order of Arts and Letters (2001); French Knight of the Legion of Honour (2011); Harvey Awards (2x)

Françoise Mouly (French: [muli]; born 24 October 1955) is a French-born American designer, editor and publisher. She is best known as co-founder, co-editor, and publisher of the comics and graphics magazine Raw (1980–1991), as the publisher of Raw Books and Toon Books, and since 1993 as the art editor of The New Yorker. Mouly is married to cartoonist Art Spiegelman, and is the mother of writer Nadja Spiegelman.

As editor and publisher, Mouly has had considerable influence on the rise in production values in the English-language comics world since the early 1980s. She has played a role in providing outlets to new and foreign cartoonists, and in promoting comics as a serious artform and as an educational tool. The French government decorated Mouly as a Knight of the Order of Arts and Letters in 2001, and as Knight of the Legion of Honour in 2011.

== Biography ==
=== Early life ===
Mouly was born in 1955 in Paris, France, the second of three daughters to Josée and Roger Mouly. She grew up in the 17th arrondissement of Paris. Her father was a plastic surgeon who in 1951 developed, with Charles Dufourmentel, the Dufourmentel-Mouly method of breast reduction.

From a young age Mouly had a love of reading, including novels, illustrated fairytale collections, comics magazines such as Pilote, and comics albums such as Tintin. She excelled as a student, and her parents planned to have her study medicine and follow her father into plastic surgery. She spent vacation time assisting and observing her father at work. She was troubled with the ethics of plastic surgery, though, which she said "exploits insecurity to such a high degree".

At thirteen, Mouly witnessed the May 68 events in France. The events led Mouly's mother and sisters to flee Paris. Mouly's father stayed in Paris to be available to his patients, and Mouly stayed as his assistant. She developed sympathies with the anarchists, and read the weekly radical Hara-Kiri Hebdo. She brought her radical leftist politics with her when her parents sent her in 1970 to the Lycée Jeanne D'Arc in central France, where she has said she was expelled "twenty-four or twenty-five times because [she] was trying to drag everyone to demonstrations".

Mouly's father was disappointed when, upon Mouly's return to Paris, she chose to forgo medicine to study architecture at the École nationale supérieure des Beaux-Arts. She lived with a boyfriend in the Latin Quarter and traveled widely in Europe, took a two-and-a-half-month van trip with friends in 1972 that reached Afghanistan, and made a solo trip to Algeria in 1974 to study the vernacular architecture, during which she was robbed of her passport and money.

Mouly grew disenchanted with the lack of creative freedom a career in architecture would present her. Her family life had grown stressful, and her parents divorced in 1974. The same year, she broke off her studies and worked as a cleaner in a hotel to save money for traveling to New York.

=== Move to New York ===
With no concrete plans, Mouly arrived in New York on September 2, 1974, with $200 in the midst of a severe economic downturn. She familiarized herself with New York's avant-garde art and film worlds, and had a part in Richard Foreman's 1975 play Pandering to the Masses. She settled into a loft in SoHo in 1975 and worked at odd jobs, including selling cigarettes and magazines in Grand Central Station and assembling models for a Japanese architectural company, all while struggling to improve her English.

While looking for comics from which to practice reading English, she came across Arcade, an underground comix magazine from San Francisco co-published by New Yorker Art Spiegelman. Avant-garde filmmaker and friend, Ken Jacobs, introduced Mouly and Spiegelman when Spiegelman was visiting, but they did not immediately develop a mutual interest. Spiegelman moved permanently back to New York later in the year. Occasionally the two ran across each other. After reading Spiegelman's 1973 strip "Prisoner on the Hell Planet", about his mother's suicide, Mouly felt the urge to contact him. An eight-hour phone call led to a deepening of their relationship. Spiegelman followed Mouly to France when she had to return to fulfill obligations in her architecture course. When Mouly ran into problems with her visa after returning to the United States in 1977, the couple solved them by getting married, first at City Hall, and then again after Mouly converted to Judaism. Beginning in 1978 Mouly and Spiegelman made yearly trips to Europe to explore the comics scene, and brought back European comics to show to their circle of friends.

Mouly became immersed in Spiegelman's personal theories of comics, and helped him prepare the lecture "Language of the Comics" delivered at the Collective for Living Cinema. She assisted in the putting together the lavish collection of Spiegelman's experimental strips Breakdowns. The printer botched the printing of the book—30% of the print run was unusable. The remaining copies had poor distribution and sales. The experience motivated Mouly to gain control over the printing process, and to find a way to get such marginal material to sympathetic readers. She took courses in offset printing in Bedford–Stuyvesant, Brooklyn, and bought an Addressograph-Multigraph Multilith printing press for her loft. During this period, she also worked as a colourist for Marvel Comics, coloring more than 50 issues of various titles.

=== Raw Books ===
In 1978, Mouly founded Raw Books & Graphics, a name settled on in part because of its small-operation feel, and because it was reminiscent of Mad magazine. Mouly worked from an aesthetic inspired in part by the Russian Constructivists, who brought a design sense to everyday objects. Raw Books began by publishing postcards and prints by artists such as underground cartoonist Bill Griffith and Dutch cartoonist Joost Swarte. More ambitious projects included art objects such as the Zippy-Scope, a cardboard device with to watch a comic strip rolled up on a film spool, featuring Griffth's character Zippy the Pinhead. Some projects were more commercial, such as the annual Streets of SoHo Map and Guide, whose advertising revenue financed much of Raw Books.

Having in this way honed her publishing skills, Mouly's ambition turned to magazine publication. Spiegelman was at first reluctant, jaded from his experience at Arcade, but agreed to co-edit in 1979. The magazine was to provide an outlet for the kinds of comics that had difficulty finding a publisher in the US, in particular younger cartoonists who fit neither the superhero nor the underground mold, and European cartoonists who did not fit the sex-and-sci-fi appetites of Heavy Metal fans.

In the midst of a commercial and artistic fallow period in the American comics industry, the lavishly printed, 10 1/2 in × 14 1/8 in (27 cm × 36 cm) first issue of Raw appeared in July 1980. Its production values resulted in a $3.50 cover price, several times the going prices for comics, either mainstream or underground. Among the comics it contained was the only strip Mouly herself was to produce, "Industry News and Review No. 6", an autobiographical strip in which she contemplates her late-1970s anxieties and thoughts of suicide. Other strips in the eclectic anthology included an example of the early 20th-century newspaper strip Dream of the Rarebit Fiend by Winsor McCay, and an excerpt from Manhattan by contemporary French cartoonist Jacques Tardi. To comics academic Jeet Heer, Raw was "a singular mixture of visual diversity and thematic unity". Each issue contained a broad variety of styles linked by a common theme, be it urban despair, suicide, or a vision of America through foreign eyes. The best-known work to run in Raw was a serialization of Spiegelman's graphic novel Maus, which ran as an insert for the duration of the magazine from the December 1980 second issue.

Mouly's approach was hands-on, and she gave great attention to every step of the printing process. The physicality of Raw was evident in each issue: tipped-in plates, bubblegum cards, and torn covers were part of the aesthetic of the magazine, accomplished by hand by Mouly, Spiegelman, and friends at gatherings after the printing of a new issue. Mouly was also hands-on when dealing with contributors, suggesting ideas and changes—an approach anathema to the editor-adverse underground spirit, but artists welcomed her input as in the end she did not interfere with their autonomy.

Raw had a strong critical reception, and also sold surprisingly well. It was not without its critics, who charged it with being highbrow and elitist, or claimed it to be a one-man Spiegelman show. Pioneer underground cartoonist Robert Crumb responded in 1981 with the magazine Weirdo, intended to remain free of editorial intrusion and stay true to comics' lowbrow roots.

Raw Books published ten One Shot books throughout the 1980s by cartoonists such as Gary Panter, Sue Coe, and Jerry Moriarty. Mouly brought a similar production sensibility to these books to what she brought to Raw: the cover to Panter's Jimbo was corrugated cardboard pasted with stickers of the book's main character. By the end of the decade, Pantheon Books had begun co-publishing Raw Books' output, and Penguin Books had picked up publishing of Raw itself. The three issues of the second volume of Raw came in a smaller, longer format with a changed emphasis on narrative rather than graphics.

Mouly divided her time between publishing and parenthood following the birth of daughter Nadja in 1987. Researching books for Sue Coe motivated her to take up science courses at Hunter College, perhaps toward a neuroscience degree. She abandoned this plan in 1991 when she gave birth to son Dashiell. In 1991, Mouly and Spiegelman published the final issue of Raw, which was no longer a small, hands-on operation, nor was it something they still thought necessary, as the artists then had a range of publishing outlets that had not existed when Raw first saw the light of day.

=== The New Yorker ===
Tina Brown became the editor of The New Yorker magazine in 1992, and hired Mouly for the art editor position. Mouly and Brown met the following March, in 1993. She proposed the magazine return to its roots by having artists as featured contributors, an increase in the visuals in the magazine, such as photographs and more illustrations, and covers in the topical style of the magazine's founder Harold Ross. Mouly brought a large number of cartoonists and artists to the periodical's interiors, including Raw contributors such as Coe, Crumb, Lorenzo Mattotti, and Chris Ware. The magazine's circulation doubled during Mouly's time there.

After the terrorist attacks on September 11, 2001, Mouly put together a cover in two black inks of different density—a black cover overlaid with a black silhouette of the two towers. Mouly gave credit for the cover to Spiegelman, who had suggested the silhouette to Mouly's idea of an all-black cover. In 2012, Mouly and daughter Nadja edited a collection of rejected New Yorker covers called Blown Covers, made up of cover sketches and covers that were deemed too risky for the magazine.

=== Raw Junior: Little Lit and Toon Books ===
After becoming parents, Mouly and Spiegelman realized how difficult it was at the end of the 20th century to find comics in English appropriate for children. In 2000 Mouly responded with the Raw Junior imprint, beginning with the anthology series Little Lit, with a roster of cartoonists from Raw, as well as children's book artists and writers such as Maurice Sendak, Lemony Snicket, and Barbara McClintock. Mouly researched the role comics could play in promoting literacy in young children, and encouraged publishers to publish comics for children. Disappointed by publishers' lack of response, from 2008 she self-published a line of easy readers called Toon Books, by artists such as Spiegelman, Renée French, and Rutu Modan, and promotes the books to teachers and librarians for their educational value. The imprint provides support materials for teachers tied into the Common Core State Standards Initiative. In 2014 Toon Books launched an imprint called Toon Graphics aimed at readers eight and up.

== Resist! ==
In 2017, Mouly and her daughter Nadja Spiegelman released two issues of the comics paper Resist!, part of the Resist! movement, criticizing the Donald Trump administration. The issues were handed out for free at the presidential inauguration on January 20, 2017 and the Women’s March on January 21, 2017.

Mouly and Spiegelman worked as guest editors for a special women’s issue of the comics tabloid Smoke Signal after being asked by editor Gabe Fowler, owner of the Brooklyn comics shop Desert Island. The mother and daughter duo created a website to make an open call for submissions that received over a thousand contributions.

The 40 page edition included original cartoons and graphics created by over 100 women, as well as 20 men and non-binary people. Some of these works were created by well-known cartoonists like Alison Bechdel, Lynda Barry, and Emil Ferris, while others were made by non-professional cartoonists.

== Recognition ==
Mouly has had a deep impact on the publishing practices of the comics world, though her name is not well known due to the behind-the-scenes nature of her work and the prominence of her Pulitzer Prize-winning husband. To comics critic and historian Jeet Heer, sexism has also played a role in minimizing the acknowledgment she receives. In 2013, Drawn & Quarterly associate publisher Peggy Burns called Mouly "one of the most influential people in comics for 30 years."

In 1989 Mouly and Spiegelman were recognized for their design work on Charles Burns' Hardboiled Defective Stories, which was given the Harvey Awards' Special Award for Excellence in Presentation. In 1991, Mouly and Spiegelman were recognized for their work on Raw when they were given the Harvey Award for Best Anthology. Mouly and Spiegelman's The TOON Treasury of Classic Children's Comics was nominated for the 2010 Eisner Award for Best Publication for Kids.

In 2011, the French government recognized Mouly as a Knight of the Legion of Honour (as her father had been), and the Society of Illustrators bestowed on her the Richard Gangel Art Director Award. At the ninth Carle Honors Awards in 2014 the Eric Carle Museum of Picture Book Art granted Mouly the Bridge Award for promoting children's literature.

Jeet Heer published a biography of Mouly in 2013 titled In Love with Art: Françoise Mouly's Adventures in Comics with Art Spiegelman. Mouly's daughter Nadja interviewed her and Mouly's mother Josée for the memoir I'm Supposed to Protect You from All This. In 2015, Mouly was the recipient of Smithsonian Magazine's American Ingenuity Award for Education.
