= Dan Frank =

American editorial director (1954–2021)

Dan Frank (March 27, 1954 – May 24, 2021) was an American editorial director at Pantheon Books.

== Early life ==
Frank was born in New York City to parents Joan (née Heming) and John Frank. His mother "produced TV shows for Hallmark and was director of publicity for the nonprofit Central Park Conservancy" while his father "ran a travel agency."

When Frank was in high school, he began taking night classes in philosophy at The New School, auditing Hannah Arendt's lectures and reading texts found on her syllabi. After graduating high school, he attended Haverford College, where he received a degree in philosophy in 1976. Afterward, he earned a master's degree "from the interdisciplinary program the Committee on Social Thought at the University of Chicago."

He attended Haverford College and received a master's degree from the University of Chicago.

While working as an editorial assistant at Harcourt Brace Jovanovich, Frank met a Lowy, whom he married in 1982.

== Career ==
=== Viking Books ===
Frank served as the editorial director at Viking Books. During his time with Viking Books, Frank worked alongside James Gleick, publishing Chaos: Making a New Science, which became a best seller and critical success. This work "represented the sort of literary nonfiction (and fiction) that Dan would aspire to: well-informed, elegantly written, presenting complex subjects accessibly, helping readers enter and understand realms they had not known about before." Gleick continued to work with Frank throughout his career.

=== Pantheon Books ===
Frank began working at Pantheon Books in 1991 when many believe the world of publishing was on the decline, serving as the vice president and senior editor. Due to issues regarding budgeting and creative control, Pantheon had recently lost the company head, Andre Schiffrin, and many editors left with him.

From 1996 to 2020, Frank served as the editorial director, "setting the tone for the [publishing] house and overseeing the list [of potential publications]." Under Frank's guidance, "Pantheon became well known as a publisher of narrative science, world literature, contemporary fiction, and graphic novels." Frank led Pantheon Books to begin a new era in book publishing with his interest in "sophisticated comics and graphic novels." By 2000, The New York Times named Pantheon the industry leader in graphic novels.

Pantheon authors have won two Pulitzer Prizes, as well as several National Book Awards, National Book Critics Circle Awards, and Eisner Awards.

Speaking of Frank's role at Pantheon, Reagan Arthur, executive vice president and publisher of Knopf, Pantheon, and Schocken, noted, "As important as the books he published and the authors he edited, Dan served as a mentor to younger colleagues, endlessly generous with his time and expertise."

==== Authors served ====
While working with Pantheon, Frank worked with various prestigious authors. The following is an incomplete list:

- Charles Baxter
- Madison Smartt Bell
- Alain de Botton
- David Eagleman
- Gretel Ehrlich
- Joseph Ellis
- James Fallows
- James Gleick
- Jonathan Haidt
- Richard Holmes
- Susan Jacoby
- Ben Katchor
- Daniel Kehlmann
- Jill Lepore
- Janna Levin
- Alan Lightman
- Corman McCarthy
- Joseph Mitchell
- Yoko Ogawa
- Cynthia Ozick
- Maria Popova
- Oliver Sacks
- Marjane Satrapi
- Orville Schell
- Art Spiegelman
- Charles Yu
- Ramachandra Guha

== Death ==
Frank died of cancer at NewYork-Presbyterian Hospital; he was 67. He is survived by his wife (Patty), as well as three sons (Jasper, Lucas and Cole) and a grandson.

Reagan Arthur, executive vice president and publisher of Knopf, Pantheon, and Schocken, announced Frank's death, noting "that Frank was so identified with the imprint it was known to some as 'Dantheon.'"
