= Pantheon Books =

American book publishing imprint

- Parent company: Random House (1961–2013); Penguin Random House (since 2013)
- Founded: 1942; 84 years ago
- Founder: Kurt Wolff & Helen Wolff, Kyrill S. Schabert, Jacques Schiffrin
- Country of origin: United States
- Headquarters location: New York City
- Key people: Dan Frank, Editorial Director, 1996–2021
- Publication types: Books
- Official website: knopfdoubleday.com/imprint/pantheon/

Pantheon Books is an American book publishing imprint. Founded in 1942 as an independent publishing house in New York City by Kurt and Helen Wolff, it specialized in introducing progressive European works to American readers. In 1961, it was acquired by Random House, and André Schiffrin was hired as executive editor, who continued to publish important works, by both European and American writers, until he was forced to resign in 1990 by Random House owner Samuel Irving Newhouse, Jr. and president Alberto Vitale. Several editors resigned in protest, and multiple Pantheon authors including Studs Terkel, Kurt Vonnegut, and Barbara Ehrenreich held a protest outside Random House. In 1998, Bertelsmann purchased Random House, and the imprint has undergone a number of corporate restructurings since then. It is now part of the Knopf Doubleday Publishing Group under Penguin Random House.

Dan Frank was Editorial Director from 1996 until his death in May 2021. Lisa Lucas joined the imprint from 2020-2024 as Senior Vice President and Publisher.

== History ==
=== Origins ===
Pantheon Books was founded in 1942 in New York City by Helen and Kurt Wolff who had come to the United States to escape fascism and the Holocaust. Pantheon is currently part of Bertelsmann. Important early works published by Pantheon were Zen and the Art of Archery by German scholar Eugen Herrigel, the Bollingen series (composed of C. G. Jung's collected works in English and books of noted Jungian scholars), the first complete translation of the I Ching, and Boris Pasternak's Doctor Zhivago.

=== Random House and André Schiffrin ===
When Random House bought Alfred A. Knopf in 1960, the front page of the New York Times reported that the merger "united two of the nation's most celebrated publishers of quality writing". The following year, Random House would buy Pantheon, which would be moved into the Knopf Publishing Group. Also in 1961, Pantheon hired André Schiffrin as executive editor of Pantheon Books.

Under the direction of Schiffrin, Pantheon continued to publish important works by European writers such as The Tin Drum by Günter Grass, who would later receive a Nobel Prize for his work; Madness and Civilization by Michel Foucault, The Lover by Marguerite Duras, and Adieux by Simone de Beauvoir. By the late 1960s, Pantheon started to bring American writers such as Noam Chomsky, James Loewen and Studs Terkel to European readers. In 1965, RCA bought Random House. Throughout the 1970s, Pantheon continued to publish intellectual and often leftist works of fiction and nonfiction "without a profit-and-loss sheet in sight". In other words, Pantheon editors prided themselves on subsidizing the cost of publishing less commercially successful (but socially or intellectually important) works with the profits from more commercially successful books.

=== S. I. Newhouse ===
In 1980, RCA sold Random House to Samuel Irving Newhouse, Jr., and Pantheon Books came under pressure to increase profits.

In December 1989, Alberto Vitale, a former banker, replaced Robert L. Berstein as chairman and president of Random House. In February 1990, Schiffrin was "asked to resign after he refused to reduce the number of titles published [by Pantheon] or to trim Pantheon's 30-member staff". In protest at Schiffrin's forced resignation and other changes in staffing, such as the hiring of Erroll McDonald, editors and staff Tom Engelhardt, Wendy Wolf, Sara Bershtel, Jim Peck, Susan Rabiner, David Sternbach, Helena Franklin, Diane Wachtell, Gay Salisbury, and several others resigned in the following months. Authors of books published by Pantheon, Random House, and other related imprints, including Studs Terkel, Kurt Vonnegut Jr., Princeton historian Arno Mayer, and Barbara Ehrenreich, held a protest outside Random House in March 1990 during which they argued that the termination of Schiffrin amounted to corporate censorship of the books that would not be printed without him. Novelist E. L. Doctorow used his acceptance speech for a fiction prize at the March 1990 National Book Critics Circle award ceremony to criticize Random House for ousting Schiffrin.

In the week following the protests, 40 Random House editors and publishers signed a statement that defended the personnel changes at Pantheon, stating: "like Pantheon, we abhor corporate censorship. We have never experienced it, nor do we believe that Pantheon has ever experienced it. We would not tolerate censorship of any form, and we are offended by any suggestion to the contrary. But, unlike Pantheon, we have preserved our independence and the independence of our authors by supporting the integrity of our publishing programs with fiscal responsibility". Another supporter of Schiffrin's termination wrote that the protests and resignations were "a hilarious specimen of people intoxicated by self-importance. It also is a case study of the descent of intellectuals' leftism into burlesque".

=== Bertelsmann ===
In 1998, Random House made news again when it was bought by Bertelsmann. Bertelsmann, the German company that also owns Bantam Books, Doubleday Publishing, and Dell Publishing, acquired Random House in 1998, along with its imprints Pantheon Books, Modern Library, Times Books, Everyman's Library, Vintage Books, Crown Publishing Group, Schocken Books, Ballantine Books, Del Rey Books, and Fawcett Publications, making Bertelsmann the largest publisher of American books.

The Authors Guild approached the Fair Trade Commission, arguing that "the $1.4 billion acquisition of Random House by Bantam's parent, Bertelsmann AG, the German media conglomerate, would create a "new economic behemoth" with the potential to restrict readers' choices and authors' ability to market their works". Bertelsmann was allowed to make the purchase, however, making it the largest publisher of English-language trade books. Again, Schiffrin protested, noting that in the eight years since Random House had come under the direction of Vitale, "Random House's 'high end'—the literary translations and books of criticism, cultural history and political analysis that had built the reputation of the Knopf and Pantheon imprints—were being sacrificed" and that concerns for the "bottom line" would outweigh intellectual and social concerns.

Schiffrin published a memoir in 2000, in which he explains his side of the controversies surrounding Pantheon and Random House called The Business of Books: How International Conglomerates Took Over Publishing and Changed the Way We Read, in which he accused Vitale and those with money-making interests of homogenizing the publishing industry by focusing too much on profits, and warns: "the resulting control on the spread of ideas is stricter than anyone would have thought possible in a free society". In a 2003 interview, former Pantheon editor Tom Engelhardt reflects on the Pantheon controversy in light of the acquisition by Bertelsmann: "Pantheon was a very specific place, publishing a very specific kind of book, and we felt that was being wiped out. As it turned out, what happened at Pantheon was the beginning of the gargantuan feasting on the independent publishing house and not-so-independent houses as well."

=== Pantheon today ===
Pantheon continues to publish well-respected fiction and non-fiction, and has more recently expanded further into graphic novels. Pantheon re-issued books in the graphic-based "...For Beginners" series (originally published by Writers and Readers Cooperative) in the 1970s and 1980s; deciding to bring the series back in 2003.

One of the first original graphic novels Pantheon published was the highly acclaimed Maus: A Survivor's Tale by Art Spiegelman in 1986. Spiegelman has become somewhat of a comics consultant, advising editor-in-chief Dan Frank. Another key member of the Pantheon Graphic Novels team is graphic designer Chip Kidd.

Recently Pantheon has moved aggressively into the comics market. In 2000, Pantheon published The Acme Novelty Library by Chris Ware. In 2005, Pantheon published The Rabbi's Cat, a graphic novel by Joann Sfar that "tells the wholly unique story of a rabbi, his daughter, and their talking cat". Notable cartoonists whose graphic novels have been published by Pantheon include Spiegelman, Ware, Dan Clowes, Charles Burns, Ben Katchor, Marjane Satrapi, and David Mazzucchelli.

It has published many critically acclaimed graphic novels and comics collections, including Ice Haven, La Perdida, Read Yourself RAW, Maus, In the Shadow of No Towers, and Black Hole. Many of its comics publications are high-quality collected editions of works originally serialized by other publishers such as Fantagraphics Books.

In early 2009, long-time Pantheon publisher Janice Goldklang was laid off as part of a general restructuring of Random House and its publishing divisions.

== Select bibliography ==
=== Literature and criticism ===
- Force and Freedom: Reflections on History by Jacob Burckhardt (1943)
- The World is Not Enough by Zoé Oldenbourg (1948)
- The Hero with a Thousand Faces by Joseph Campbell (1949)
- The I Ching; or, Book of Changes translated by Richard Wilhelm and Cary F. Baynes (1950). Contains an extensive Introduction by Carl Jung. Originally issued in two volumes – subsequently in one volume.
- Winds by Saint-John Perse (1953)
- The Collected Works of Paul Valéry in English, 15 Volumes and Bibliography, Bollingen Series XLV, General Editor Jackson Mathews, Various Translators, Published by Pantheon Books, New York. Volume One issued in 1956, with later volumes following in the ensuing years.
- Doctor Zhivago by Boris Pasternak (first published in 1957; later published in 1959)
- The Tin Drum by Günter Grass (1963)
- Madness and Civilization: A History of Insanity in the Age of Reason by Michel Foucault (1965)
- Division Street: America by Studs Terkel (1967)
- American Power and the New Mandarins by Noam Chomsky (1969)
- At War with Asia by Noam Chomsky (1970)
- Hard Times: An Oral History of the Great Depression by Studs Terkel (1970)
- The Order of Things: An Archaeology of the Human Sciences by Michel Foucault (1970)
- Problems of Knowledge and Freedom by Noam Chomsky (1971)
- The Archaeology of Knowledge by Michel Foucault (1972)
- For Reasons of State by Noam Chomsky (1973)
- Peace in the Middle East: Reflections on Justice and Nationhood by Noam Chomsky (1974)
- Working: People Talk About What They Do All Day and How They Feel About What They Do by Studs Terkel (1974)
- Mississippi: Conflict & Change by James Loewen and Charles Sallis (1974)
- Reflections on Language by Noam Chomsky (1975)
- Sound Effects: Youth, Leisure, and the Politics of Rock'n'Roll by Simon Frith (1981)
- When Things of the Spirit Come First: Five Early Tales by Simone de Beauvoir (1982)
- The Empire's Old Clothes: What the Lone Ranger, Babar, and Other Innocent Heroes Do to Our Minds by Ariel Dorfman (1983)
- Adieux: A Farewell to Sartre by Simone de Beauvoir (1984)
- After The Second Sex: Conversations with Simone de Beauvoir by Alice Schwarzer and Simone de Beauvoir (1984)
- The Lover by Marguerite Duras (1985)
- Women Writing About Men by Jane Miller (1986)
- The Woman Destroyed by Simone de Beauvoir (1987)
- The Sadeian Woman and the Ideology of Pornography by Angela Carter (1988)
- Manufacturing Consent: The Political Economy of the Mass Media by Edward S. Herman and Noam Chomsky
- The Death of Rhythm & Blues by Nelson George (1988)
- On Record: Rock, Pop, and the Written Word by Simon Frith and Andrew Goodwin (1990)
- Stop the Violence: Overcoming Self Destruction by Nelson George (1990)
- The Book of Disquiet by Fernando Pessoa (1991)
- Felix: The Twisted Tale of the World's Most Famous Cat by John Canemaker (1991)
- Rhythm Oil: A Journey Through the Music of the American South by Stanely Booth (1991)
- Pasolini Requiem by Barth D. Schwartz (1992)
- Einstein's Dreams by Alan Lightman (1993)
- The Birth of the Beat Generation: Visionaries, Rebels, and Hipsters, 1944–1960 by Steven Watson (1995)
- Deep Sightings and Rescue Missions: Fiction, Essays, and Conversations by Toni Cade Bambara and Toni Morrison (1996)
- In the Country of Country: People and Places in American Music by Nicholas Dawidoff (1997)
- Blues Legacies and Black Feminism: Gertrude "Ma" Rainey, Bessie Smith, and Billie Holiday by Angela Davis (1998)
- Holy Clues: Investigating Life's Mysteries with Sherlock Holmes by Stephen Kendrick (1999)
- House of Leaves by Mark Z. Danielewski (2000)
- The Whalestoe Letters by Mark Z. Danielewski (2000)
- Parallels and Paradoxes: Explorations in Music and Society by Daniel Barenboim, Edward W. Said, and Ara Guzelimian (2002)
- Boogaloo: The Quintessence of American Popular Music by Arthur Kempton (2003)
- Against Love: A Polemic by Laura Kipnis (2003)
- The End of Blackness: Returning the Souls of Black Folk to Their Rightful Owners by Debra Dickerson (2004)
- Give our Regards to the Atomsmashers! Writers on Comics by Sean Howe (2004)
- Shakespeare After All by Marjorie B. Garber (2004)
- Tango: The Art History of Love by Robert Farris Thompson (2005)
- On Michael Jackson by Margo Jefferson (2006)
- Only Revolutions by Mark Z. Danielewski (2006)
- The Good Husband of Zebra Drive by Alexander McCall Smith (2007)
- The Little Book of Plagiarism by Alexander Posner (2007)
- Bambi vs. Godzilla: On the Nature, Purpose, and Practice of the Movie Business by David Mamet (2007)
- Toussaint Louverture: A Biography by Madison Smartt Bell (2007)
- The Father of all Things: A Marine, His Son, and the Legacy of Vietnam by Tom Bissell (2007)
- Soon I Will Be Invincible by Austin Grossman (2007)
- SUM by David Eagleman (2009)
- Incognito: The Secret Lives of the Brain by David Eagleman (2011)
- The Accidental Universe by Alan Lightman (2014)
- The Familiar, Volume 1: One Rainy Day in May by Mark Z. Danielewski (2015)
- The Familiar, Volume 2: Into the Forest by Mark Z. Danielewski (2015)
- The Brain: The Story of You by David Eagleman (2015)
- The Familiar, Volume 3: Honeysuckle & Pain by Mark Z. Danielewski (2016)
- The Familiar, Volume 4: Hades by Mark Z. Danielewski (2017)
- The Familiar, Volume 5: Redwood by Mark Z. Danielewski (2017)
- Livewired: The Inside Story of the Ever-Changing Brain by David Eagleman (2020)

=== Selections from the Bollingen Series ===
- Myths and Symbols in Indian Art and Civilization, eds. Heinrich Robert Zimmer and Joseph Campbell (1946)
- The I Ching or Book of Changes, Wilhelm, R., and C. Baynes, 1967. With foreword by Carl Jung. 3rd ed., Bollingen Series XIX. Princeton NJ: Princeton University Press (1st ed. 1950).
- The Collected Works of C.G. Jung by Carl Jung (1953)
- Psychological Reflections: An Anthology of the Writings of C.G. Jung by Carl Jung (1953)
- Creative Intuition in Art and Poetry by Jacques Maritain (1953)
- Egyptian Religious Texts and Representations by Alexandre Piankoff and Natacha Rambova (1954)
- The Origins and History of Consciousness by Erich Neumann (1954)
- Painting and Reality by Étienne Gilson (1957)
- Yoga: Immortality and Freedom by Mircea Eliade (1958)
- Zen and Japanese Culture by Daisetz Teitaro Suzuki (1959)
- Art and Illusion: A Study in the Psychology of Pictorial Representation by E. H. Gombrich (1960)
- Of Divers Arts by Naum Gabo (1962)
- The "I" and the "Not-I": A Study in the Development of Consciousness by Mary Esther Harding (1965)
- Birds by Saint-John Perse and Georges Braque (1966)
- Eleusis: Archetypal Image of Mother and Daughter by Karl Kerényi (1967)

=== Comics and graphic novels ===
- The "...for Beginners" series of comics:
  - Go for Beginners by Kaoru Iwamoto and Ishi Press (1976) ISBN 0394733312
  - Lenin for Beginners by Richard Appignanesi and Oscar Zarate (1978)
  - Freud for Beginners by Richard Appignanesi and Oscar Zarate (1979)
  - Trotsky for Beginners by Tariq Ali (1980)
  - Ecology for Beginners by Stephen Croall and William Rankin (1981)
  - Marx's Kapital for Beginners by David N. Smith, and Phil Evans, and Karl Marx (1982)
  - Nuclear Power for Beginners by Stephen Croall and Kaianders Sempler (1983)
  - Economists for Beginners by Bernard Canavan (1983)
- Love is Hell by Matt Groening (1985)
- Maus I: A Survivor's Tale: My Father Bleeds History by Art Spiegelman (1986)
- Read Yourself RAW by Art Spiegelman and Françoise Mouly (1987)
- School is Hell: A Cartoon Book by Matt Groening (1987)
- Childhood is Hell: A Cartoon Book by Matt Groening (1988)
- The Big Book of Hell: A Cartoon Book by Matt Groening (1990)
- Maus II: A Survivor's Tale: And Here My Troubles Began by Art Spiegelman (1991)
- Love is Still Hell: A Cartoon Book by Matt Groening (1994)
- The Jew of New York by Ben Katchor (1998)
- Ethel & Ernest by Raymond Briggs (1998)
- David Boring by Daniel Clowes (2000)
- Jimmy Corrigan: The Smartest Kid on Earth by Chris Ware (2000)
- Julius Knipl, Real Estate Photographer: The Beauty Supply District by Ben Katchor (2000)
- In the Floyd Archives: A Psycho-Bestiary by Sarah Boxer (2001)
- Persepolis by Marjane Satrapi (2003)
- In the Shadow of No Towers by Art Spiegelman (2004)
- Persepolis II by Marjane Satrapi (2004)
- Amy and Jordan by Mark Beyer (2004)
- Black Hole by Charles Burns (2005)
- Embroideries by Marjane Satrapi (2005)
- Epileptic by David Beauchard (2005)
- Ice Haven by Daniel Clowes (2005)
- The Rabbi's Cat by Joann Sfar (2005)
- Chicken with Plums by Marjane Satrapi (2006)
- La Perdida by Jessica Abel (2006)
- A Scanner Darkly by Philip K. Dick, adapted by Richard Linklater (2006)
- Alias the Cat! by Kim Deitch (2007)
- Breakdowns: Portrait of the Artist as a Young %@*! by Art Spiegelman (2008)
- My Brain Is Hanging Upside Down by David Heatley (2008)
- Asterios Polyp by David Mazzucchelli (2009)
- A.D.: New Orleans After the Deluge by Josh Neufeld (2009)
- Habibi by Craig Thompson (2011)
- The Cardboard Valise by Ben Katchor (2011)
- My Brother's Husband by Gengoroh Tagame (2014)
