= Breakdowns (comics) =

Anthology of comics by Art Spiegelman

- Cover to the first edition
- Creator: Art Spiegelman
- Date: 1977
- Publisher: Bélier Press; Pantheon Books

Breakdowns is a collected volume of underground comic strips by American cartoonist Art Spiegelman. The book is made up of strips dating to before Spiegelman started planning his graphic novel Maus, but includes the strip "Maus" which presaged the graphic novel, and "Prisoner on the Hell Planet" which is reproduced in Maus. The original edition from 1977 is subtitled From Maus to Now; the expanded 2008 edition is subtitled Portrait of the Artist as a Young %@&*!.

== Overview ==
The original 1977 edition was made up of short, experimental strips, some of which were autobiographical, made between 1972 and 1977. They were underground comics, made while Spiegelman was living in San Francisco. At that stage in his career, Spiegelman was more interested in the formal elements of the comics medium than in its content or storytelling aspects. He experimented with and explored the relation of panels to each other on the page, pictorial manipulation, and how far one could take a story formally before it became incoherent. He parodied and paid homage to his cartoon heroes, notably Chester Gould's Dick Tracy, Rex Morgan, M.D., and Winsor McCay's Dream of the Rarebit Fiend.

The cover depicts Spiegelman drinking a bottle of India ink over repeated variants of the same image. The title is written in shaky block letters, implying both visual and psychological breakdowns.

=== Portrait of the Artist as a Young %@&*! (2008) ===
Breakdowns was republished in 2008 with the new subtitle Portrait of the Artist as a Young %@&*!. This new edition included an autobiographical introduction that gave context to his early life and love of comics. The expanded 2008 edition made use of a swirl or squiggle motif. The seemingly tossed-off squiggle is used in a variety of contexts. It is first introduced as the expression of surprise of the character on the cover slipping on a copy of the first edition of Breakdowns (rather than a clichéd banana peel). At other times it is used to represent the artist himself, or the squiggles he makes as a youth learning to draw.

Spiegelman depicts himself in the vest that has become synonymous with his image since Maus, in contrast to his appearance in the comics from the original Breakdowns.

== Publication history ==
Breakdowns was originally published in an edition that sold less than 3000 copies in 1977 by Belier Press as Breakdowns: From Maus to Now, collecting strips that had appeared between 1972 and 1977 in various underground publications, including Arcade, which Spiegelman had co-edited. Unusually for American comics at the time, it was published in hardcover.

It was republished in an expanded edition by Pantheon Books in 2008 and retitled Breakdowns: Portrait of the Artist as a Young %@&*!, with a new introductory comic and long afterword which nearly double the length of the original book. When Spiegelman had been working on In the Shadow of No Towers, a book with many of the formal concerns of Breakdowns, his editor at Pantheon Books, Dan Frank, approached him to reprint Breakdowns.

== Style and analysis ==
The concept of the title, Breakdowns, has more than one meaning. It refers to both the physical printmaking process, in which breakdowns refer to the layers of dye applied to the paper. It also refers to Spiegelman's own mental breakdowns while writing the comics and experiencing trauma. In some scenes, especially in Portrait of an Artist as a young %@&*!, as Spiegelman recreates experience of a mental breakdown, the art similarly begins to show layers of the printing breakdowns, though missing color layers, intentional misprinting, etc.

Spiegelman visually relates the story of a boy who bullied him and spat on his mother in his youth, echoing with irony the well-known Charles Atlas advertisements such as "The Insult that Made a Man out of Mac" that ran in comic books. He fills the dialog balloons with text from Viktor Shklovsky's essay "Art as Technique". Spiegelman has an avid interest in replicating his "film-maker friends," and the way could edit and rearrange scenes within their films to create new context and meaning, a concept that makes an appearance in his comic "Short Circuit." Spiegelman discusses how "same size panels are the basic unit, one can rearrange, replace or reuse parts; sequences can be edited like film footage!" inserting panels from multiple comics in Portrait of an Artist as a young %@&*!.

== Reception and legacy ==
The volume failed to capture a wide audience. Spiegelman says this indifference was the impetus to take on Maus. Later criticism has positioned Breakdowns as a key transitional work in Spiegelman’s development, foreshadowing his mature experiments in Maus and influencing subsequent generations of formalist cartoonists.
