= Master Gee =

Master Gee may refer to:

- Master Gee (musician) (born 1962), member of hip hop and funk group The Sugarhill Gang
- Master Gee (wrestler) (born 1947), retired American professional wrestler

== See also ==
- Master of G
- Mister G (disambiguation)
- Mr G
