= The Cardboard Valise =

- Cover of The Cardboard Valise displaying its fold-out handles
- Date: 2011
- Page count: 128 pages
- Publisher: Pantheon Books

Creative team
- Creator: Ben Katchor

Original publication
- Date of publication: 2011
- ISBN: 978-0-375-42114-3

The Cardboard Valise is a graphic novel by American cartoonist Ben Katchor. Published by Pantheon Books in 2011, it brought Katchor the National Cartoonists Society's Graphic Novel Award.

The book deals with its characters' obsessive tourism. It was Pantheon's first graphic novel to be released in ebook format in addition to the hardcover edition.

== Overview ==
The story follows Emile Delilah, a compulsive vacationer, who loves other cultures so much that he cannot keep himself at home; and the "supranationalist" Elijah Salamis, who walks around in his underwear in all weather, rejecting national and cultural boundaries.

== Publication history ==
The story was originally serialized, as The Jew of New York and his Julius Knipl strips, in various alternative newspapers, and was originally completed in 2000. The collected edition, however, wasn't released until March 15, 2011—Katchor's first book in over ten years. In the collected edition, the original strips were left as is, but new material was added "to amplify the through-story", Katchor said, and the new material can be spotted by careful readers. "I wanted the new pages to look like an annotation, a new kind of drawing".

Katchor says the time was right to return to The Cardboard Valise, as we're living in an age where people are thinking about the disappearance of paper and the culture that went with it. The book was also Pantheon's first (and to date, only) graphic novel to be released as an e-book simultaneously with the hardcover edition. To date (Nov. 2011), the e-book has not been released.

The hardcover edition also featured fold-out cardboard handles.
