= Independent media =

Mass communication outlets not associated with governments or corporations

Independent media is mass media, such as television, newspapers, or Internet-based publications, that is free of influence by government or corporate interests. Independence stands as a cornerstone principle within media policy and the freedom of the press, representing an "essentially contested concept". The concept is often used to denote, declare, or claim independence from state-control, market forces, or conventions, and media organisations and individuals assert their legitimacy and credibility through it.

In various discussions, such as those regarding the role of media within authoritarian societies or the relevance of European public service broadcasters or the "alternative press", the concept of independence is interpreted diversely. In international development, the term "independent media" is used for the development of new media outlets, particularly in areas where there is little to no existing media presence. Additionally, digital transformations tend to compromise the press as a common good (with a blurring of the difference between journalism and advertising) by the technological, political and social dynamics that it brings. For this reason other norms, such as transparency and participation, may be considered to be more relevant.

Research has found independent media plays an important role in improving government accountability and reducing corruption.

== Overview ==
Media regulators' impact on the editorial independence of the media, which is still deeply entwined with political and economic influences and pressures. Private media – functioning outside of governments' control and with minimum official regulation – are still dependent on advertising support, risking potential misuse of advertisers as a political tool by larger advertisers such as governments. New technologies have added new meaning to what constitutes media independence. The collection, selection, aggregation, synthesis and processing of data are now increasingly delegated to forms of automation. While the sharing of social media posts is crucial in elevating the importance of certain news sources or stories, what appears in individual news feeds on platforms such as Facebook or news aggregators such as Google News is the product of other forces as well. This includes algorithmic calculations, which remove professional editorial judgment, in favor of past consumption patterns by the individual user and their social network. In 2016, users declared preferring algorithms over editors for selecting the news they wanted to read. Despite apparent neutrality algorithms may often compromise editorial integrity, and have been found to lead to discrimination against people based on their race, socioeconomic situation and geographic location. Anya Schiffrin says that despite the initial optimism that social media would reduce such tendencies by enabling broader citizen participation in media, there are growing signals that social media are similarly susceptible to political capture and polarization, further impacting on the trust that users may have towards information on these platforms.

== Regulation ==
The role of regulatory authorities (license broadcaster institutions, content providers, platforms) and the resistance to political and commercial interference in the autonomy of the media sector are both considered as significant components of media independence. In order to ensure media independence, regulatory authorities should be placed outside of governments' directives. this can be measured through legislation, agency statutes and rules.

=== Government regulations ===
==== Licensing ====
The process of issuing licenses in many regions still lacks transparency and is considered to follow procedures that are obscure and concealing. In many countries, regulatory authorities stand accused of political bias in favor of the government and ruling party, whereby some prospective broadcasters have been denied licenses or threatened with the withdrawal of licenses. In many countries, diversity of content and views have diminished as monopolies, fostered directly or indirectly by States. This not only impacts on competition but leads to a concentration of power with potentially excessive influence on public opinion. Buckley et al. cite failure to renew or retain licenses for editorially critical media; folding the regulator into government ministries or reducing its competencies and mandates for action; and lack of due process in the adoption of regulatory decisions, among others, as examples in which these regulators are formally compliant with sets of legal requirements on independence while enforcing political agendas.

==== Government endorsed appointments ====
State control is also evident in the increasing politicization of regulatory bodies operationalized through transfers and appointments of party-aligned individuals to senior positions in regulatory authorities.

==== Internet regulation ====
Governments worldwide have sought to extend regulation to internet companies, whether connectivity providers or application service providers, and whether domestically or foreign-based. The impact on journalistic content can be severe, as internet companies can err too much on the side of caution and take down news reports, including algorithmically, while offering inadequate opportunities for redress to the affected news producers.

=== Self-regulation ===
==== Regional ====
In Western Europe, self-regulation provides an alternative to state regulatory authorities. In such contexts, newspapers have historically been free of licensing and regulation, and there has been repeated pressure for them to self-regulate or at least to have in-house ombudsmen; however, it has often been difficult to establish meaningful self-regulatory entities. In many cases, self-regulations exist in the shadow of state regulation, and is conscious of the possibility of state intervention. In many countries in Central and Eastern Europe, self-regulatory structures seem to be lacking or have not historically been perceived as efficient and effective. The rise of satellite delivered channels, delivered directly to viewers, or through cable or online systems, renders much larger the sphere of unregulated programming. There are, however, varying efforts to regulate the access of programmers to satellite transponders in parts of the Western Europe and North American region, the Arab region and in Asia and the Pacific. The Arab Satellite Broadcasting Charter was an example of efforts to bring formal standards and some regulatory authority to bear on what is transmitted, but it appears to not have been implemented.

==== International organizations and NGOs ====
Self-regulation is expressed as a preferential system by journalists but also as a support for media freedom and development organizations by intergovernmental organizations such as UNESCO and non-governmental organizations. There has been a continued trend of establishing self-regulatory bodies, such as press councils, in conflict and post-conflict situations. Major internet companies have responded to pressure by governments and the public by elaborating self-regulatory and complaints systems at the individual company level, using principles they have developed under the framework of the Global Network Initiative. The Global Network Initiative has grown to include several large telecom companies alongside internet companies such as Google, Facebook and others, as well as civil society organizations and academics. The European Commission’s 2013 publication, ICT Technology Sector Guide on Implementing the United Nations Guiding Principles on Business and Human Rights, impacts on the presence of independent journalism by defining the limits of what should or should not be carried and prioritized in the most popular digital spaces.

==== Private sector ====
Public pressure on technology giants has motivated the development of new strategies aimed not only at identifying ‘fake news’, but also at eliminating some of the structural causes of their emergence and proliferation. Facebook has created new buttons for users to report content they believe is false, following previous strategies aimed at countering hate speech and harassment online. These changes reflect broader transformations occurring among tech giants to increase their transparency. As indicated by the Ranking Digital Rights Corporate Accountability Index, most large internet companies have reportedly become relatively more forthcoming in terms of their policies about transparency in regard to third party requests to remove or access content, especially in the case of requests from governments. At the same time, however, the study signaled a number of companies that have become more opaque when it comes to disclosing how they enforce their own terms of service, in restricting certain types of content and account.

==== Fact-checking and news literacy ====
In addition to responding to pressure for more clearly defined self-regulatory mechanisms, and galvanized by the debates over so-called "fake news", internet companies such as Facebook have launched campaigns to educate users about how to more easily distinguish between ‘fake news’ and real news sources. Ahead of the United Kingdom national election in 2017, for example, Facebook published a series of advertisements in newspapers with ‘Tips for Spotting False News’ which suggested 10 things that might signal whether a story is genuine or not. There have also been broader initiatives bringing together a variety of donors and actors to promote fact-checking and news literacy, such as the News Integrity Initiative at the City University of New York’s School of Journalism. This 14 million USD investment by groups including the Ford Foundation and Facebook was launched in 2017 so its full impact remains to be seen. It will, however, complement the offerings of other networks such as the International Fact-Checking Network launched by the Poynter Institute in 2015 which seeks to outline the parameters of the field.

== Influences in media systems ==
The media systems around the world are often put under pressure by the widespread delegitimisation by political actors of the media as a venerable institution along with the profession of journalism, and the growing efforts made towards media capture, particularly online media, which has often been regarded as more resistant to such form of control than other types of media.

=== Delegitimisation tactics ===
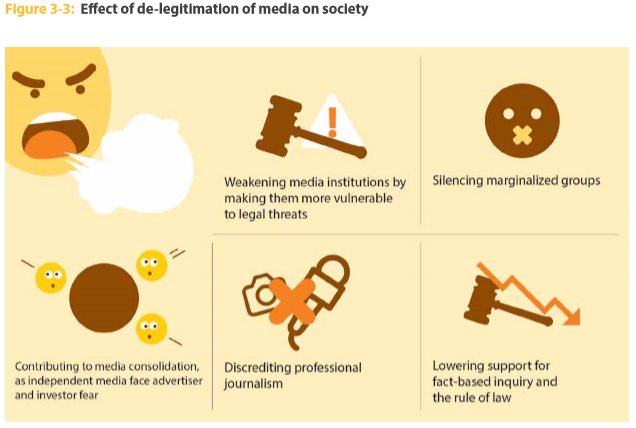
Effect of delegitimisation of media on society

==== Discreditation ====
Powerful actors such as governments have often been seen to initiate and engage in the process of systematic attacks on the media by trivializing it, or sometimes characterizing it as an ‘enemy’ has widespread implications for the independence and well-being of the sector. This can be particularly apparent during elections. A common tactic is to blur the distinction between mainstream news media, and the mass of unverified content on social media. Delegitimisation is a subtle and effective form of propaganda, reducing the public's confidence in the media to perform a collective function as a check on government. This can be seen as being linked political and social polarization.

==== Attacks on media ====
In some regions, delegitimisation is reportedly combined with wider attacks on independent media: key properties have been closed down or sold to parties with ties to the government. Newer entrants linked to state power and vast resources gain sway. Opposition to these pressures may strengthen the defense of the press as civil society and mobilize the public in protest, but in some cases, this conflict leads to fear-induced apathy or withdrawal. Advertisers and investors may be scared-off by delegitimisation.

==== Criminal defamation ====
Efforts to curtail criminal defamation are still ongoing in many regions but the dangers from civil lawsuits with high costs and high risk are also rising, leading to a greater likelihood of bankruptcy of media outlets. Independence is weakened where the right of journalists to criticize public officials is threatened. A general assault on the media can lead to measures making journalists more frequently liable for publishing state secrets and their capacity to shield sources can be reduced. Delegitimizing the media makes it easier to justify these legal changes that make the news business even more precarious.

=== Media capture ===
Media capture refers to the full range of forces that can restrict or skew coverage. It has been defined as "a situation where the media have not succeeded in becoming autonomous in manifesting a will of their own, nor able to perform their main function, notably of informing people. Instead, they have persisted in an intermediate state, with vested interests, and not just the government, using them for other purposes." Mungiu-Pippidi, one of the first to document the phenomenon, considers that capture corrupts the main role of the media: to inform the public, with media outlets instead opting to trade influence and manipulate information. This can involved converting editorially independent public media to state media, or even co-opting influencers to more covertly advance the narrative of an authoritarian regime.

Full capture can also be complicated to achieve. Paid trolls leading to phenomena such as paid Twitter and mob attacks, along with fake news and rumors, are reportedly able to widely disseminate their attacks on independent journalists with the aid of bots. Across much of Africa, a trend of "serial callers" has become increasingly common. Also observed in other regions, such as in North America where the phenomenon is commonly referred to as "astroturfing", serial callers are often individuals commissioned by political actors to constantly phone in to popular radio call in programmes with the intention of skewing or influencing the program in their interest. In some cases, the programme might be structurally biased towards such actors (e.g., there will be a dedicated phone for those that have planned to phone in with particular political sympathies) but in other cases the process is more ad hoc with sympathetic callers flooding particular radio programs.^{118}

=== Financial regulations and business models ===
==== Concentration of media ownership ====
Financial threats on media independence can be concentrated ownership power, bankruptcy, or unsustainable funding for public service broadcasters. Capital controls for media are in place in all regions to manage foreign direct investment in the media sector. Many governments in Africa, Latin America and the Caribbean, and the Asia and Pacific regions have passed stringent laws and regulations that limit or forbid foreign media ownership, especially in the broadcasting and telecom sectors, with mixed impact on editorial independence. In Latin America, almost two-thirds of the 15 countries covered by a World Bank study on foreign direct investments impose restrictions on foreign ownership in the newspaper-publishing sector. Almost all countries specify a cap on foreign investment in the media sector, although increasingly the strategy in the region has been to absorb private and foreign capital and experience of media management without losing ownership and political control of the media sector. It is more complex to regulate ownership issues when the companies are internet platforms spanning multiple jurisdictions, although European competition and tax law has responded to some of the challenges in this regard, with unclear impact on the issue of independence of journalistic content on Internet companies.

==== New business models ====
Across the industry, media outlets have been re-evaluating where the value in media content lies, with a corresponding increase in government development programs, corporate benefactors and other special interests funding or cross-funding media content. These kinds of funding have been common historically in international broadcasting, and they typically influence actual media content, framing, and the ‘red lines’ different from professional principles that reporters feel unable to cross. While larger media companies have relied on attracting their own advertisers online, many online intermediaries such as Google Ads now exist, which effectively has meant that small online media companies can get some revenues without having to have dedicated facilities—although the requirements of platforms like Facebook for video content, and the power to change news feeds without consultation do compromise editorial autonomy. In addition, the media organization concerned can no longer exert strong control over what advertisements are shown, nor can it benefit from accessing full audience data to strengthen its own revenue prospects.

=== Journalist perceptions ===
According to the Worlds of Journalism Study, journalists in 18 of the 21 countries surveyed in Western Europe and North America perceived their freedom to make editorial decisions independently to have shrunken in the past five years. In all other regions, a plurality of journalists in most countries reported their editorial freedom to have strengthened. While there remains a marked decline in print advertising sales in these States, some newspapers are reporting an increase in digital advertising revenues and subscriptions that have enabled expansions of newsrooms that previously faced significant financial difficulty. This development partly reflects the relationship between major news brands and electoral cycles but it may also signal a growing willingness on the part of readers to pay for quality digital content.

=== Mitigating political and economic interference ===
Several tools and organizations commit to mitigating political and economic interference in the media system.

==== Regulatory bodies ====
In some countries, the rise of trade bodies as a dominating site of advocacy seems to limit the plurality of voices involved or consulted to those representing mainly owner interests in decision-making. This has occurred as the lobbying power of media elites has increased with ownership consolidation, particularly in North America. In some cases, the relative formal independence of the media regulator from the government may have made it more vulnerable to capture by commercial interests. Some of the board members from these trade bodies and associations sit on government working groups and are members of committees. Such members often facilitate the associations’ indirect participation in the drafting of media laws and policies.^{121}

==== Professionalization of regulatory bodies ====
According to the World Trends in Freedom of Expression and Media Development Global Report 2017/2018, there is a strong societal demand for the professionalization of regulatory and media bodies:

- Governmental alliances such as the Freedom Online Coalition and NGOs such as IFEX and the Media Legal Defence Initiative.
- Training of lawyers and judges has gained in popularity. UNESCO has provided training in this vein to 5,000 employees of the judicial sector in Latin America, and is commencing a similar initiative in Africa.
- There is also an increase in online training for journalism. Massive Open Online Courses (MOOCs) and increased internet access in all regions of the world: There are a number of distance learning programs based in the United States and the United Kingdom, such as the Knight Centre for Journalism in the Americas, which also offers courses in Spanish serving countries in Latin America. The BBC Academy is another prominent example. The University of South Africa offers online degrees and short courses, including in media, to a global audience.
- Technology companies have demonstrated a growing interest in these activities, particularly as they attempt to influence policy at a domestic level. Google, Facebook, and others have recently established policy offices also in Africa and the Arab region with a mandate to support the development of conducive policies and legal frameworks, as well as informed lawyers and policymakers, for their products.

==== Journalistic standards ====
- Codes of ethics are a common way to promote journalistic standards. While there have been a number of codes of ethics for journalists that aspire to universal status, and even some for ‘online journalists’ and bloggers, most transnational news agencies and broadcasters adhere to their own codes, although not all are publicly available.
- In most regions, newspapers have developed their own codes of conduct with consistent values and standards that publishers and journalists should observe. Some newspapers have also appointed an ombudsman or readers’ representative to handle complaints from the public.
- In many countries, press councils and associations function like trade unions for journalists seeking to improve working conditions and to remove barriers journalists face when gathering news.
- Depending on the country, independent press councils are formed on a non-statutory basis and in some cases, they are mandated by law.

==== Media development ====
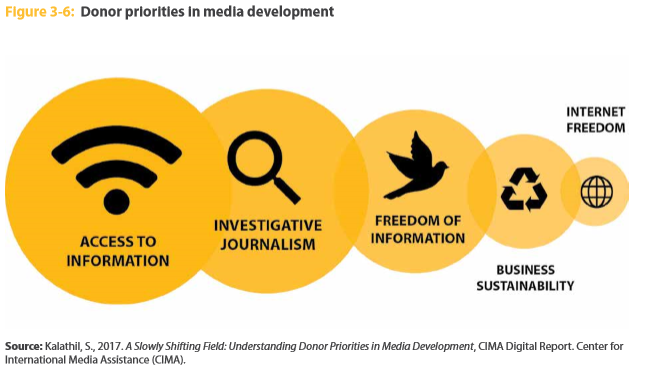
Donors priorities in media development, UNESCO

Media development and freedom of expression is often promoted by non-governmental organizations. These organizations might bring specific expertise on how to balance a budget or transition from a state media without editorial independence to a public service media with independence. $1.8 billion in journalism and media-related grants were distributed by 6,568 foundations between 2010 and 2015 according to a 2018 Northeastern University study, but the collapse of the newspaper industry has been a major headwind for the capacity building efforts of the philanthropy. The 2018 study states "foundations have played a behind-the-scenes role in guiding the direction of the nonprofit news sector, including the types of subjects covered, organizations supported, and regions prioritized." Private foundations based in the Global North had been increasingly providing grants to media organizations in the Global South. Such funds are often directed to cover specific topics of interest, such as health or education.

== See also ==
- Concentration of media ownership
- Independent sources
- Journalism ethics and standards
- Media manipulation
- Media transparency
- Media bias
- Public broadcasting
- State media
- Censorship
- Central bank independence
- Civil control of the military
- Civil service independence
- Judicial independence
- Separation of church and state
- Open government
- Access journalism
