= Read Yourself Raw =

Comic anthology

Publication information
- Publisher: Pantheon
- Format: Comic book
- Genre: Art/Humor
- Publication date: 1987
- Editor(s): Art Spiegelman; Françoise Mouly

Read Yourself RAW is a comic anthology collecting the non-Maus contents of the first three issues of the magazine RAW, edited by Art Spiegelman and Françoise Mouly and published in October 1987 by Pantheon Books.

== Origin ==
The contents of Read Yourself Raw are a selection of comics by various artists originally published from Raw magazine issues one to three, a comics anthology that circulated from 1980 to 1991. It also includes the original covers, illustrations, and reprints of the inserts that were in those issues.

== Contents ==
Read Yourself Raw omits Maus from its collection. Instead, it strictly desires to showcase the comic works from artists, and international artists who deserve to receive more attention and larger readership in the United States. Since Raw is out of print and had a limited run, the original issues are rare. Read Yourself Raw became the only way to get a rerelease of some of the works published from Raw issues one to three because there were no reprintings and these older issues were often resold at a marked-up price.

One shared characteristic of Read Yourself Raw and Raw is that it is difficult for the editor, Art Spiegelman, to define the magazine and its intended audience. He says in Read Yourself Raw:

Raw seems to confuse a lot of people. Is it a comic book? Is it an art magazine? It's too "upscale" to be easily dismissed as garbage, the way many otherwise reasonable have become accustomed to thinking about comics, but it has an urgency that makes it seems out of place on a coffee table. Of course it has a following¬—but it's a difficult magazine to define. Our stationery announces it as "The Graphix Magazine That Changes Its Subtitle Every Issue." And that much at least, is true.

— Art Spigelman, Art Spigelman and Francois Mouly, ed, Read Yourself Raw (New York: Pantheon Books, 1987), 4.

Françoise Mouly defines her editorial decisions for Raw as:

It's very hard to verbally express what our criteria are, but they have a lot to do with the artist setting up a goal that's somewhere around the best he or she can do and accomplishing it. It has to do with a certain craft, a certain honesty, and the expression of a unique point of view and personality.

— Francoise Mouly, Robert Pfeiffer, "Touching a Nerve with Raw; The Chaotic Comic Book for Adults Is a Far Cry From the 'Funnies'," The Washington Post. ProQuest Historical Newspapers, September 1, 1986.

As a reader flips through the pages, they are exposed to design and art that set itself apart from other comics and magazines published during the 1980s. From the outset, both Raw and Read Yourself Raw stand out on the newsstand or bookshelves. Both book's oversized format is printed on intricate, die-cut covers of which some were hand-ripped and re-tape that speaks to its high production values, and attention to detail. Read Yourself Raw also includes recreations of the bubble-gum cards was stapled into the original issues. These many handmade interventions and special inserts characterizes Mouly's intention to challenge “the prejudice against comics as toilet literature, that they should be printed only on newsprint and disposable.”
