= Independent sources =

The term "multiple independent sources" in journalism, criminal justice, science and general research, refers to two or more unconnected people, organizations, entities or objects which provide a given set of information or samples. For example, two separate people who witness a traffic accident, first hand, could be considered independent sources. However, if one person witnessed the accident and told the other one about it, then they would not be independent, since one would depend on the other for their information. Also, if two witnesses to an event discuss what they saw before they are consulted and agree on a consistent story, then they are also no longer independent. As another example, two scientific devices could be considered independent sources of measurement data, unless they shared the same wiring or electrical power supply (or similar factors).

Consulting multiple independent sources is a common technique for detecting errors and deception, as any divergences or contradictions between statements, or data samples, would likely indicate one of these.

The American judge Learned Hand declared that "Right conclusions are more likely to be gathered out of a multitude of tongues, than through any kind of authoritative selection. To many this is, and will always be, folly; but we have staked upon it our all."

The New York Times has in some situations imposed minimal standard for reporting a fact not otherwise attributed to a single speaker is that it be verified by at least two independent sources.

Circular reporting is a situation where multiple sources appear to be independent, but in reality originate from a single source. Because circular reporting can happen inadvertently in many situations, extra care must be taken to ensure that multiple sources actually are independent, rather than interconnected in an obscure manner.

== See also ==
- Editorial independence, not permitting advertisers to dictate news content
- Independent media
