= Mister G =

Mister G may refer to:

- King Gustaf V of Sweden, playing tennis under the pseudonym Mister G
- Mister G (children's performer)
- Mr G, a fictional character in Summer Heights High portrayed by Chris Lilley
- Mr g, a 2012 novel by Alan Lightman
- Irv Gikofsky, better known as "Mr. G", weatherman serving the New York City metropolitan area
- Mr. G, a fictional character from The Letter People

== See also ==
- Gee (surname)
