= The Accidental Universe =

2014 book by Alan Lightman

- Author: Alan Lightman
- Language: English
- Genre: Non fiction
- Publisher: Pantheon Books
- Publication date: January 14, 2014

The Accidental Universe is a 2014 nonfiction book by physicist and author Alan Lightman.

== Synopsis ==
The book is a collection of seven essays on the history of science and its impact on mankind's understanding of their place in the universe.

== Reception ==
Some critics praised its writing style and insights on philosophy and the natural world.
