= Media capture =

Form of control over media outlets by political or economic interests

A 2018 UNESCO report shows media capture being counteracted by media self-regulation

Media capture is a form of systemic corruption in which mass media is controlled by governments, corporations, or powerful individuals to serve their own interests instead of the public interest, undermining media independence and media pluralism. The concept describes how vested interests can dominate or co-opt nominally independent media institutions through ownership, regulation, or financing, whilst maintaining the illusion of press freedom.

The most widely held definition of the term was published by Alina Mungiu-Pippidi in 2008: "either directly by governments or by vested interests networked with politics".

According to Joseph Stiglitz: "Preventing capture, and ensuring that the media can perform their societal function, requires an understanding of the myriad and sometimes subtle ways the media can be compromised by the very actors they are supposed to monitor."

== Description ==
Media capture occurs when media outlets fail to achieve autonomy from external power, operating instead as instruments of state or private agendas. It is distinguished from censorship by its indirect mechanisms—such as ownership concentration, clientelism, and state advertising—used to manipulate editorial independence. The phenomenon undermines the media’s role as a watchdog, reducing its capacity to hold power to account.

According to Marius Dragomir, writing for UNESCO, media capture involves the takeover of four key levers of influence: media regulation, state-owned outlets, government financing, and private ownership. Governments can exert control through partisan appointments to regulatory bodies and manipulation of licensing or funding systems. In parallel, wealthy elites and corporations may use ownership or advertising leverage to align editorial policy with their political or economic interests.

Media capture reduces government accountability by limiting public access to independent information. Captured outlets tend to serve the interests of those in power, enabling corruption and rent extraction. It can also exacerbate income inequality by allowing elites to shape narratives that justify policies benefiting them.

== Historical development ==
The idea of media capture builds on theories of elite influence and the propaganda model proposed by Edward S. Herman and Noam Chomsky. Historically, captured media systems have appeared in both authoritarian and democratic contexts, including Russia, Hungary, Turkey, and Mexico. In these cases, political–business alliances have consolidated control over major news outlets, marginalizing critical journalism.

In recent years, scholars have written that media capture has taken place in the United States.

== Prevention and responses ==
Scholars and NGOs propose transparency in ownership, independent regulation, and new models for public-interest journalism as remedies. Organizations such as Reporters Without Borders, Freedom House, Article 19, and the Center for International Media Assistance campaign to expose and counteract media capture through advocacy and monitoring initiatives. These efforts emphasize that media capture, like regulatory capture, represents a systemic threat to democracy.

== See also ==
- Regulatory capture
- Political corruption

== Bibliography ==
- Dragomir, Marius (2020-12-31). Reporting Facts: Free from Fear or Favour. InFocus report in the series World Trends in Freedom of Expression and Media Development. Paris: UNESCO. ISBN 978-92-3-100422-3.
- Mabweazara, Hayes Mawindi; Pearson, Bethia (2024-11-20). Media Capture in Africa and Latin America: Power and Resistance. Springer Nature. ISBN 978-3-031-68962-8.
- Schiffrin, Anya, ed. (2017). In the Service of Power: Media Capture and the Threat to Democracy (PDF). Center for International Media Assistance. ISBN 978-0-9818254-3-4.
- Schiffrin, Anya (2021-06-22). Media Capture: How Money, Digital Platforms, and Governments Control the News. Columbia University Press. ISBN 978-0-231-54802-1.
- Schiffrin, Anya (2021-09-22). "Media Capture". Oxford Bibliographies Online.
- Usher, Nikki (2021-06-22). "From Media Capture to Platform Capture". In Schiffrin, Anya (ed.). Media Capture: How Money, Digital Platforms, and Governments Control the News. Columbia University Press. p. 30-45. ISBN 978-0-231-54802-1.
- Zaid, Bouziane; Ibahrine, Mohammed; Ben Moussa, Mohamed; Makki, Alaa (2025-08-09). "Shifting Power Dynamics: Media Capture and Platform Dominance in Journalism". Digital Journalism. 13 (7): 1311–1330. doi:10.1080/21670811.2025.2532509. ISSN 2167-0811.
