= Mr g =

2012 novel by Alan Lightman

- First edition cover (US)
- Author: Alan Lightman
- Cover artist: Rodrigo Corral Design
- Language: English
- Genre: Novel
- Publisher: Pantheon Books
- Publication date: January 24, 2012
- Publication place: United States
- Pages: 214
- ISBN: 9780307379993

Mr g is a 2012 novel by Alan Lightman. The book was released on January 24, 2012, by Pantheon Books and the book is narrated by Mr g as he describes the process of creation.

== Synopsis ==
Mr g features a fictional depiction of God as he forms Creation and tries to deal with his Aunt Penelope and Uncle Deva, who live in the Void. The book depicts God ("Mr g") as a being that is omnipotent but not omniscient, as the universe is created through "trial and error". Mr g is further bothered by his rival Belhor, who constantly challenges him to explain everything and to exempt humanity from rational laws.

== Themes ==
The book features several themes, predominantly the concept of God as a powerful entity that is not all-knowing despite being capable of Creation. Lightman was inspired to write the book due to an interest in "the meeting ground of science, theology, and philosophy, especially the ethical questions at the border of science and theology".

== Reception ==
Critical reception for Mr g has been mixed, with Toronto's The Star giving an ambivalent review for the book. Detractors of Mr g have cited that the book is overly light for its subject matter and lacked coherency, while critics that praised the novel cited it as "witty" and "imaginative".
