= Anya Schiffrin =

American university instructor and business journalist (born 1962)

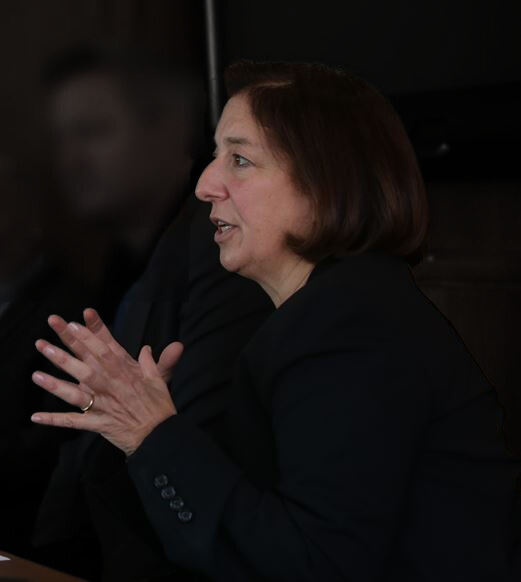
- Schiffrin in 2022
- Born: December 6, 1962 (age 63)
- Education: Reed College, Columbia University School of Journalism; University of Navarra
- Occupations: University instructor, business journalist
- Father: André Schiffrin

Anya Schiffrin (born December 6, 1962) is the co-director of the Technology Policy and Innovation (TPI) Concentration at Columbia University's School of International and Public Affairs (SIPA), and a senior lecturer at the School of International and Public Affairs. Previously, she served as the director of the Technology, Media, and Communications (TMaC) specialization at SIPA.

== Biography ==
Anya Schiffrin is an American former business journalist. Previously, she freelanced and worked as an editor in Istanbul, a stringer for Reuters in Barcelona, a senior financial writer at The Industry Standard in New York, bureau chief for Dow Jones Newswires in Amsterdam and Hanoi and a writer for many other publications. She was a former Knight-Bagehot academic fellow in business journalism at Columbia's Graduate School of Journalism. Schiffrin is an alumna of Reed College, Columbia University School of Journalism, and University of Navarra, Spain, where she achieved a Ph.D. with honors.

In addition to her role in the School of International and Public Affairs, Dr. Schiffrin holds multiple influential roles across various organizations in international journalism and media governance. She is the co-chair of the OSCE Working Group tasked with producing recommendations for governments on press freedom, a director on the U.S. Board of Directors of the Thomson Reuters Foundation, and a member of the Working Group "Information as a Public Good in the Age of Datafication and Artificial Intelligence" for the International Panel on Social Progress (appointed September 2024).

She serves on boards of Reporters Without Borders USA, The GroundTruth Project, Global Board and the advisory board of the Natural Resource Governance Institute (formerly named Revenue Watch Institute)., the Global Reporting Centre of the University of British Columbia, Ethosfera.org, and The Trust Project. She has chaired the board of directors for The New Humanitarian.

Dr. Schiffrin also advises the American Journalism Project and Columbia University Press, while contributing to the Forum on Information and Democracy’s Infodemics Working Group. Additionally, she has contributed to the AI Charter in Media initiative by Reporters Without Borders as a committee member since 2023.

Previously, Dr. Schiffrin served on the Open Society Foundations' journalism program (2016–2023), the Center for Media, Data and Society of Central European University (2013–2019), the Scientific Advisory Board of the European Forum Alpbach (2018–2023), the board of the American Assembly (2016–2019), and the Steering Committee of the Center on Global Energy Policy (2016–2018). She also served on the advisory board of Transparentem (2015–2017) and the board of the African journalism NGO, African Sentinel (2013–2015).

In addition, she has been a visiting fellow at the Reuters Institute at the University of Oxford and an expert witness on media freedom issues.

She writes extensively on topics including journalism and development, the impact of technology on journalism, platform regulations and remuneration, media in Africa, and the extractive sector, among other areas. In recent years, her research work with economist Haaris Mateen on why tech giants owe publishers billions of dollars garnered significant attention and recognition.

She is a leading thinker and commentator on AI and publishing, media capture, media sustainability as well as mis/disinformation and media impact. Her most recent work includes AI and the future of journalism: an issue brief for stakeholders, part of the UNESCO series World Trends in Freedom of Expression and Media Development, The role of journalism promoting democracy and political accountability and sustainable development, co-authored with Joseph E. Stiglitz and Dylan Groves, and Creating National Funds to Support Journalism and Public-Interest Media, co-authored with Brigitte Alfter.

She has edited several notable publications on journalism and media, including Women in the Digital World (Routledge, 2023), Media Capture: How Money, Digital Platforms, and Governments Control the News (Columbia University Press, 2021), African Muckraking: 75 Years of Investigative Journalism from Africa (Jacana Press, 2017), In the Service of Power: Media Capture and the Threat to Democracy (Center for International Media Assistance, 2017), and Global Muckraking: 100 Years of Investigative Reporting from Around the World (New Press 2014).

She is the daughter of the author and publisher André Schiffrin and the sister-in-law of the lawyer Philippe Sands. She was married on October 29, 2004, to Nobel Prize-winning economist and author Joseph E. Stiglitz, who also teaches at Columbia University in New York City.

In 2011, her Reuters columns about the gender balance at Davos attracted international attention.

== Books ==
- Women in the Digital World (2023) (editor), ISBN 9781032452142
- Media Capture: How Money, Digital Platforms, and Governments Control the News (2021) (editor), ISBN 9780231188838
- African Muckraking: 75 Years of Investigative Journalism from Africa (2017) (co-editor with George William Lugalambi), ISBN 978-1431425860
- Media in the Service of Power: Media Capture and the Threat to Democracy (2017) (editor), ISBN 978-0-9818254-2-7
- Global Muckraking: 100 Years of Investigative Journalism from Around the World (2014) (editor), ISBN 978-1-595589-73-6
- From Cairo to Wall Street: Voices from the Global Spring (2012) (co-editor with Eamon Kircher-Allen), ISBN 978-1-595588-27-2
- Bad News: How America's Business Press Missed the Story of the Century (2011) (editor), ISBN 978-1-595585-49-3
- Covering Labor: A Reporter's Guide to Worker's Rights in a Global Economy (2006) (co-editor with Liza Featherstone), ISBN 978-0-977852-30-7
- Covering Oil: A Reporter's Guide to Energy and Development (2005) (co-editor with Svetlana Tsalik), ISBN 978-1-891385-45-2
- Business and Economic Reporting: Covering Companies, Financial Markets and the Broader Economy (2005) (co-author with Margie Freaney and Jane M. Folpe)
- Covering Globalization: A Handbook for Reporters (2004) (co-editor with Amer Bisat), ISBN 978-0-231131-75-9
