= The Jew of New York =

1999 graphic novel by Ben Katchor

- Date: 1999
- Publisher: Pantheon Books

Creative team
- Creator: Ben Katchor
- ISBN: 0-375-40104-0 (hc, 1999); 0-375-70097-8 (sc, 2000)

Chronology
- Preceded by: Julius Knipl, Real Estate Photographer: Stories (1996)
- Followed by: Julius Knipl, Real Estate Photographer: The Beauty Supply District (2000)

The Jew of New York is a graphic novel by Ben Katchor, inspired by Mordecai Manuel Noah's attempt to establish a Jewish homeland in Grand Island, New York in the 1820s. It was originally serialized in the pages of The Jewish Daily Forward before being published in book form in 1999.
