= Art Spiegelman =

American cartoonist (born 1948)

- Spiegelman in 2026
- Born: Itzhak Avraham ben Zeev Spiegelman; February 15, 1948 (age 78) Stockholm, Sweden
- Areas: Cartoonist, Editor
- Notable works: Breakdowns; Maus; Garbage Pail Kids
- Spouse: Françoise Mouly (m. 1977)
- Children: Nadja Spiegelman; Dashiell Spiegelman
- Art Spiegelman's voice from the BBC programme Bookclub, February 5, 2012.

Itzhak Avraham ben Zeev Spiegelman (/ˈspiːɡəlmən/ SPEE-gəl-mən; born February 15, 1948), professionally known as Art Spiegelman, is a Polish-American cartoonist, editor, and comics advocate best known for his graphic novel Maus. His work as co-editor on the comics magazines Arcade and Raw has been influential, and from 1992 he spent a decade as contributing artist for The New Yorker. He is married to designer and editor Françoise Mouly and is the father of writer Nadja Spiegelman. In September 2022, the National Book Foundation announced that he would receive the Medal for Distinguished Contribution to American Letters.

Spiegelman began his career with Topps (a bubblegum and trading card company) in the mid-1960s, which was his main financial support for two decades; there he co-created parodic series such as Wacky Packages in the 1960s and Garbage Pail Kids in the 1980s. He gained prominence in the underground comix scene in the 1970s with short, experimental, and often autobiographical work. A selection of these strips appeared in the collection Breakdowns in 1977, after which Spiegelman turned his focus to the book-length Maus, about his relationship with his father, a Holocaust survivor. The postmodern graphic novel depicts Germans as cats, Jews as mice, ethnic Poles as pigs, and citizens of the United States as dogs. Spiegelman spent 13 years on the project, completing it in 1991. In 1992 it won a special Pulitzer Prize and has gained a reputation as a pivotal work.

Spiegelman and Mouly edited eleven issues of Raw from 1980 to 1991. The oversized comics and graphics magazine helped introduce talents who became prominent in alternative comics, such as Charles Burns, Chris Ware, and Ben Katchor, and introduced several foreign cartoonists to the English-speaking comics world. Beginning in the 1990s, the couple worked for The New Yorker, which Spiegelman left to work on In the Shadow of No Towers (2004), about his reaction to the September 11 attacks in New York in 2001.

Spiegelman advocates for greater comics literacy. As an editor, a teacher, and a lecturer, Spiegelman has promoted better understanding of comics and has mentored younger cartoonists.

== Family history ==
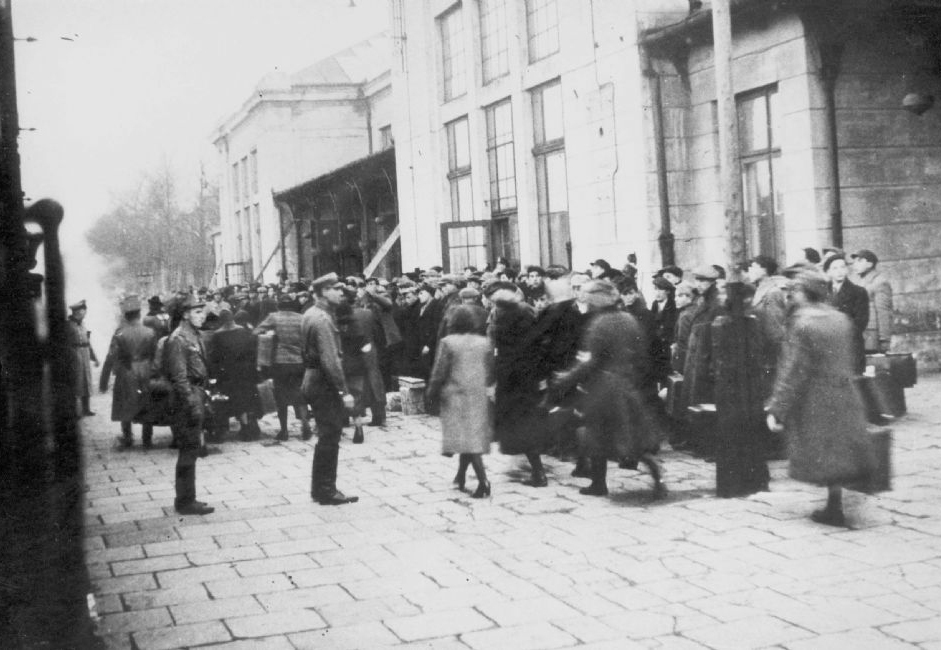
Liquidation at the Sosnowiec Ghetto in occupied Poland during World War II; Spiegelman tells of his parents' survival in Maus.

Spiegelman's parents were Polish Jews Władysław (1906–1982) and Andzia (1912–1968) Spiegelman. His father was born Zeev Spiegelman, with the Hebrew name Zeev ben Avraham. Władysław was his Polish name, and Władek (or Vladek in anglicized form) was a diminutive of this name. He was also known as Wilhelm under the German occupation, and Anglicized his name to William upon immigration to the United States. His mother was born Andzia Zylberberg, with the Hebrew name Hannah. She changed her name to Anna upon immigrating to the United States. In Spiegelman's Maus, from which the couple are best known, Spiegelman used the spellings "Vladek" and "Anja", which he believed would be easier for Americans to pronounce. The surname Spiegelman is German for "mirror man".

In 1937, the Spiegelmans had one other son, Rysio (spelled "Richieu" in Maus), who died before Art was born, at the age of five or six. During the Holocaust, Spiegelman's parents sent Rysio to Zawiercie to stay with his maternal aunt, Tosha, with whom they believed he would be safe. In 1943, the aunt poisoned herself, along with Rysio and two other young family members in her care, so that the Nazis could not take them to the extermination camps. After the war, the Spiegelmans, unable to accept that Rysio was dead, searched orphanages all over Europe in the hope of finding him. Spiegelman talked of having a sort of sibling rivalry with his "ghost brother"; he felt unable to compete with an "ideal" brother who "never threw tantrums or got in any kind of trouble". Of 85 Spiegelman relatives alive at the beginning of World War II, only 13 are known to have survived the Holocaust.

== Life and career ==
=== Early life ===
He began cartooning in 1960 and imitated the style of his favorite comic books, such as Mad. In the early 1960s, he contributed to early fanzines such as Smudge and Skip Williamson's Squire, and in 1962—while at Russell Sage Junior High School in Forest Hills, Queens, where he was an honors student—he produced the Mad-inspired fanzine Blasé. He was earning money from his drawing by the time he reached high school and sold artwork to the original Long Island Press and other outlets. His talent caught the eyes of United Features Syndicate, who offered him the chance to produce a syndicated comic strip. Dedicated to the idea of art as expression, he turned down this commercial opportunity. He attended the High School of Art and Design in Manhattan beginning in 1963. He met Woody Gelman, the art director of Topps Chewing Gum Company, who encouraged Spiegelman to apply to Topps after graduating from high school. At age 15, Spiegelman received payment for his work from a Rego Park newspaper.

After he graduated in 1965, Spiegelman's parents urged him to pursue the financial security of a career such as dentistry, but he chose instead to enroll at Harpur College to study art and philosophy. While there, he got a freelance art job at Topps, which provided him with an income for the next two decades.

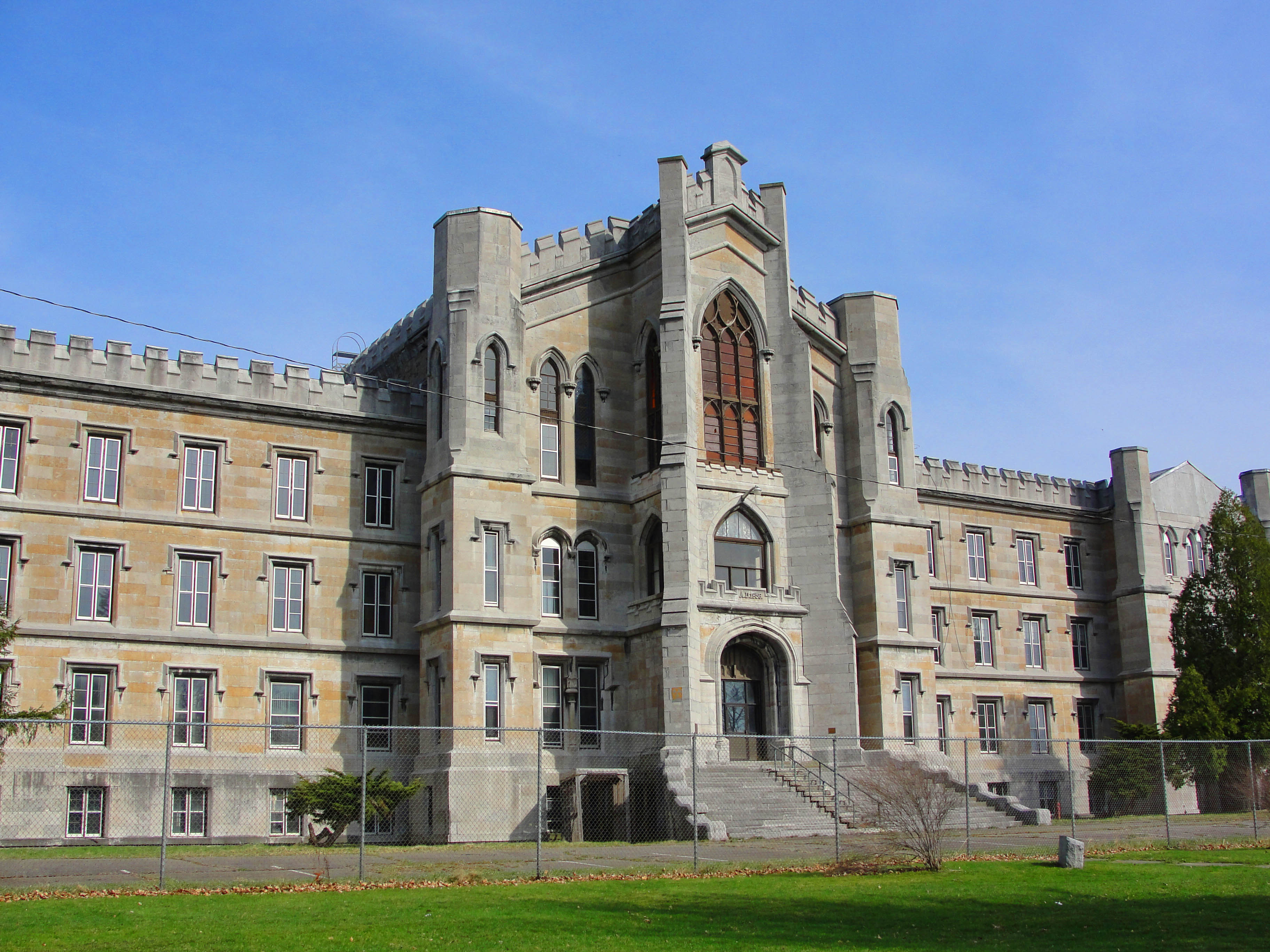
After Spiegelman's release from Binghamton State Mental Hospital, his mother died by suicide.

Spiegelman attended Harpur College from 1965 until 1968, where he worked as staff cartoonist for the college newspaper and edited a college humor magazine. After a summer internship when he was 18, Topps hired him for Gelman's Product Development Department as a creative consultant making trading cards and related products in 1966, such as the Wacky Packages series of parodic trading cards begun in 1967.

Spiegelman began selling self-published underground comix on street corners in 1966. He had cartoons published in underground publications such as the East Village Other and traveled to San Francisco for a few months in 1967, where the underground comix scene was just beginning to burgeon.

In late winter 1968, Spiegelman suffered an intense nervous breakdown, which cut short his university studies. He has said that at the time he was taking LSD with great frequency. He spent a month in Binghamton State Mental Hospital, and shortly after he exited it, his mother died by suicide following the death of her only surviving brother.

=== Underground comics (1971–1977) ===
In 1971, after several visits, Spiegelman moved to San Francisco and became a part of the countercultural underground comix movement that had been developing there. Some of the comix he produced during this period include The Compleat Mr. Infinity (1970), a ten-page booklet of explicit comic strips, and The Viper Vicar of Vice, Villainy and Vickedness (1972), a transgressive work in the vein of fellow underground cartoonist S. Clay Wilson. Spiegelman's work also appeared in underground magazines such as Gothic Blimp Works, Bijou Funnies, Young Lust, Real Pulp, and Bizarre Sex, and were in a variety of styles and genres as Spiegelman sought his artistic voice. He also did a number of cartoons for men's magazines such as Cavalier, The Dude, and Gent.

In 1972, Justin Green asked Spiegelman to do a three-page strip for the first issue of Funny Aminals [sic]. He wanted to do one about racism, and at first considered a story with African Americans as mice and cats taking on the role of the Ku Klux Klan. Instead, he turned to the Holocaust that his parents had survived. He titled the strip "Maus" and depicted the Jews as mice persecuted by die Katzen, which were Nazis as cats. The narrator related the story to a mouse named "Mickey". With this story Spiegelman felt he had found his voice.

Seeing Green's revealingly autobiographical Binky Brown Meets the Holy Virgin Mary while in-progress in 1971 inspired Spiegelman to produce "Prisoner on the Hell Planet", an expressionistic work that dealt with his mother's suicide; it appeared in 1973 in Short Order Comix #1, which he edited. Spiegelman's work thereafter went through a phase of increasing formal experimentation; the Apex Treasury of Underground Comics in 1974 quotes him: "As an art form the comic strip is barely in its infancy. So am I. Maybe we'll grow up together." The often-reprinted "Ace Hole, Midget Detective" of 1974 was a Cubist-style nonlinear parody of hardboiled crime fiction full of non sequiturs. "A Day at the Circuits" of 1975 is a recursive single-page strip about alcoholism and depression in which the reader follows the character through multiple never-ending pathways. "Nervous Rex: The Malpractice Suite" of 1976 is made up of cut-out panels from the soap-opera comic strip Rex Morgan, M.D. refashioned in such a way as to defy coherence.

In 1973, Spiegelman edited a pornographic and psychedelic book of quotations and dedicated it to his mother. Co-edited with Bob Schneider, it was called Whole Grains: A Book of Quotations. In 1974–1975, he taught a studio cartooning class at the San Francisco Academy of Art.

By the mid-1970s, the underground comix movement was encountering a slowdown. To give cartoonists a safe berth, Spiegelman co-edited the anthology Arcade with Bill Griffith, in 1975 and 1976. Arcade was printed by The Print Mint and lasted seven issues, five of which had covers by Robert Crumb. It stood out from similar publications by having an editorial plan, in which Spiegelman and Griffith attempt to show how comics connect to the broader realms of artistic and literary culture. Spiegelman's own work in Arcade tended to be short and concerned with formal experimentation. Arcade also introduced art from ages past, as well as contemporary literary pieces by writers such as William S. Burroughs and Charles Bukowski. In 1975, Spiegelman moved back to New York City, which put most of the editorial work for Arcade on the shoulders of Griffith and his cartoonist wife, Diane Noomin. This, combined with distribution problems and retailer indifference, led to the magazine's 1976 demise. Spiegelman swore he would never edit another magazine.

Françoise Mouly, an architectural student on a hiatus from her studies at the Beaux-Arts in Paris, arrived in New York in 1974. While looking for comics from which to practice reading English, she came across Arcade. Avant-garde filmmaker friend Ken Jacobs introduced Mouly and Spiegelman, when Spiegelman was visiting, but they did not immediately develop a mutual interest. Spiegelman moved back to New York later in the year. Occasionally the two ran across each other. After she read "Prisoner on the Hell Planet" Mouly felt the urge to contact him. An eight-hour phone call led to a deepening of their relationship. Spiegelman followed her to France when she had to return to fulfill obligations in her architecture course.

Spiegelman introduced Mouly to the world of comics and helped her find work as a colorist for Marvel Comics. After returning to the U.S. in 1977, Mouly ran into visa problems, which the couple solved by getting married. The couple began to make yearly trips to Europe to explore the comics scene, and brought back European comics to show to their circle of friends. Mouly assisted in putting together the lavish, oversized collection of Spiegelman's experimental strips Breakdowns in 1977.

=== Raw and Maus (1978–1991) ===
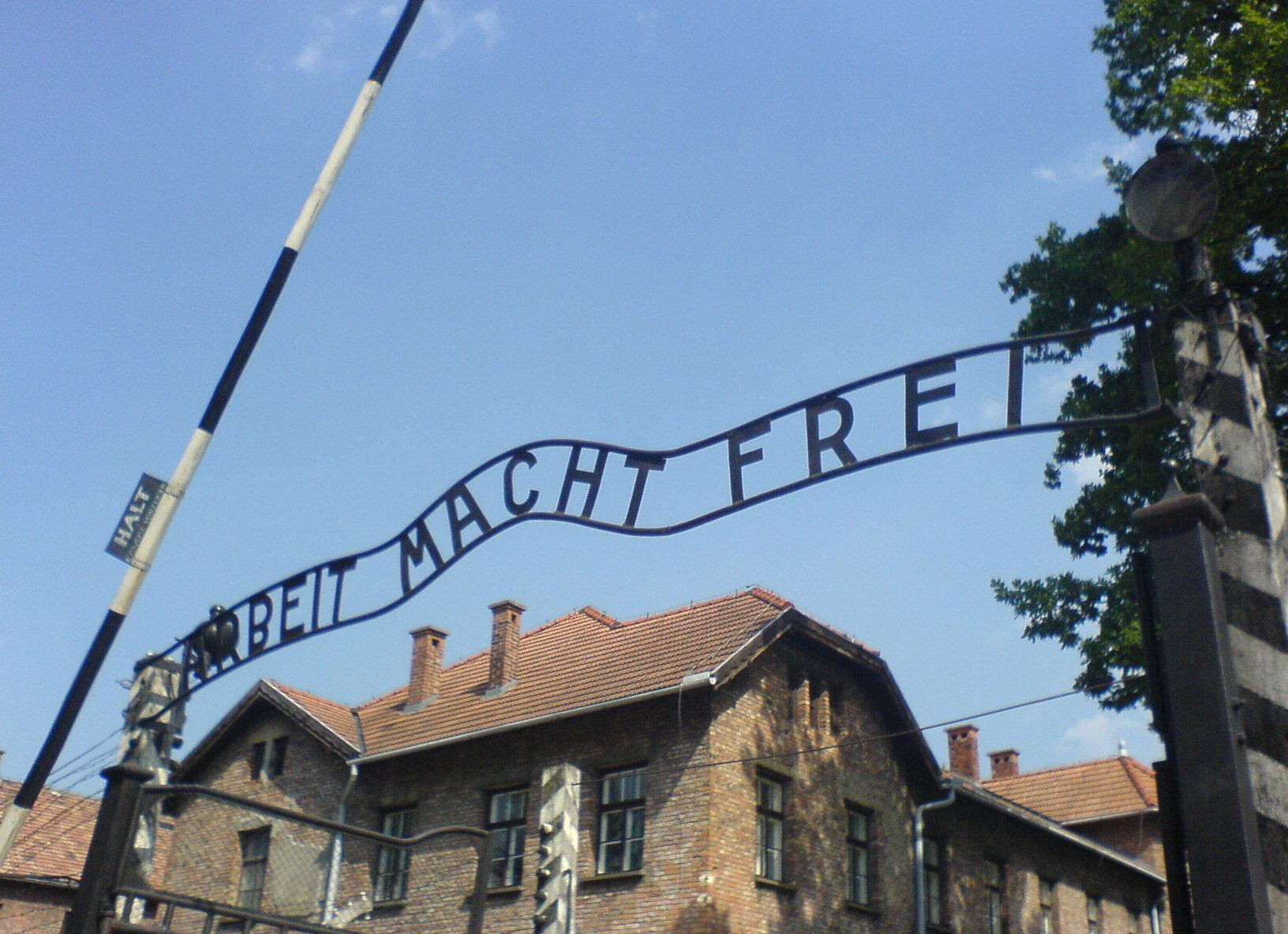
Spiegelman visited the Auschwitz concentration camp in 1979 as research for Maus; his parents had been imprisoned there.

Breakdowns suffered poor distribution and sales, and 30% of the print run was unusable due to printing errors, an experience that motivated Mouly to gain control over the printing process. She took courses in offset printing and bought a printing press for her loft, on which she was to print parts of a new magazine she insisted on launching with Spiegelman. With Mouly as publisher, Spiegelman and Mouly co-edited Raw starting in July 1980. The first issue was subtitled "The Graphix Magazine of Postponed Suicides". While it included work from such established underground cartoonists as Crumb and Griffith, Raw focused on publishing artists who were virtually unknown, avant-garde cartoonists such as Charles Burns, Lynda Barry, Chris Ware, Ben Katchor, and Gary Panter, and introduced English-speaking audiences to translations of foreign works by José Muñoz, Chéri Samba, Joost Swarte, Yoshiharu Tsuge, Jacques Tardi, and others.

With the intention of creating a book-length work based on his father's recollections of the Holocaust, Spiegelman began to interview his father again in 1978 and made a research visit in 1979 to the Auschwitz concentration camp, where his parents had been imprisoned by the Nazis. The book, Maus, appeared one chapter at a time as an insert in Raw beginning with the second issue in December 1980. Spiegelman's father did not live to see its completion; he died on 18 August 1982. Spiegelman learned in 1985 that Steven Spielberg was producing an animated film about Jewish mice who escape persecution in Eastern Europe by fleeing to the United States. Spiegelman was sure the film, An American Tail (1986), was inspired by Maus and became eager to have his unfinished book come out before the movie to avoid comparisons. He struggled to find a publisher until in 1986, after the publication in The New York Times of a rave review of the work-in-progress, Pantheon agreed to release a collection of the first six chapters. The volume was titled Maus: A Survivor's Tale and subtitled My Father Bleeds History. The book found a large audience, in part because it was sold in bookstores rather than in direct-market comic shops, which by the 1980s had become the dominant outlet for comic books.

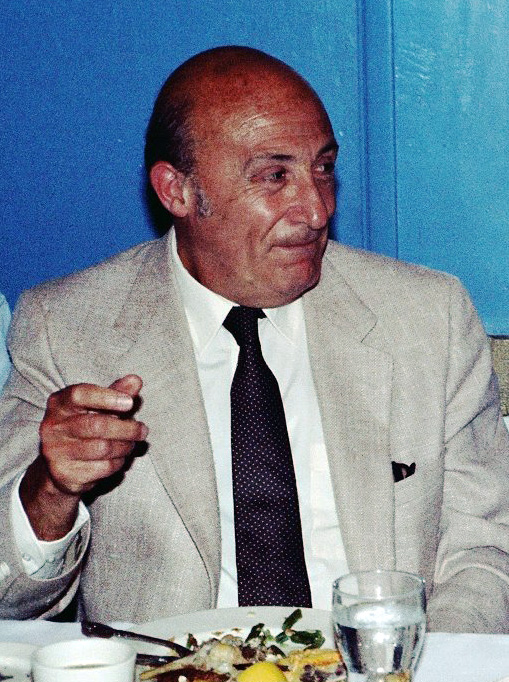
Spiegelman and Will Eisner (photographed in 1982) taught at the School of Visual Arts from 1978 to 1987.

Spiegelman began teaching at the School of Visual Arts in New York in 1978, and continued until 1987, teaching alongside his heroes Harvey Kurtzman and Will Eisner. "Commix: An Idiosyncratic Historical and Aesthetic Overview", a Spiegelman essay, was published in Print. Another Spiegelman essay, "High Art Lowdown", was published in Artforum in 1990, critiquing the High/Low exhibition at the Museum of Modern Art.

In the wake of the success of the Cabbage Patch Kids series of dolls, Spiegelman created the parodic trading card series Garbage Pail Kids for Topps in 1985. Similar to the Wacky Packages series, the gross-out factor of the cards was controversial with parent groups, and its popularity started a gross-out fad among children. Spiegelman called Topps his "Medici" for the autonomy and financial freedom working for the company had given him. The relationship was nevertheless strained over issues of credit and ownership of the original artwork. In 1989 Topps auctioned off pieces of art Spiegelman had created rather than returning them to him, and Spiegelman broke the relation. In 1990, he received a Guggenheim Fellowship for Fine Arts.

In 1991, Raw Vol. 2, No. 3 was published; it was to be the last issue. The closing chapter of Maus appeared not in Raw but in the second volume of the graphic novel, which appeared later that year with the subtitle And Here My Troubles Began. Maus attracted an unprecedented amount of critical attention for a work of comics, including an exhibition at New York's Museum of Modern Art and a special Pulitzer Prize in 1992.

=== The New Yorker and public legitimacy (1992–2001) ===
Spiegelman and Mouly began working for The New Yorker in the early 1990s.

Hired by Tina Brown as a contributing artist in 1992, Spiegelman worked for The New Yorker for ten years. His first cover appeared on the February 15, 1993, Valentine's Day issue and showed a black West Indian woman and a Hasidic man kissing. The cover caused turmoil at The New Yorker offices. Spiegelman intended it to reference the Crown Heights riot of 1991 in which racial tensions led to the murder of a Jewish yeshiva student. Twenty-one New Yorker covers by Spiegelman were published, and he also submitted some which were rejected for being too outrageous.

Within The New Yorker's pages, Spiegelman contributed strips such as a collaboration, "In the Dumps", with children's illustrator Maurice Sendak and an obituary to Charles M. Schulz, "Abstract Thought is a Warm Puppy". Another of Spiegelman's essays, "Forms Stretched to their Limits", in an issue was about Jack Cole, the creator of Plastic Man. It formed the basis for a book about Cole, Jack Cole and Plastic Man: Forms Stretched to Their Limits (2001).

The same year, Voyager Company published The Complete Maus, a CD-ROM version of Maus with extensive supplementary material, and Spiegelman illustrated a 1923 poem by Joseph Moncure March called The Wild Party. Spiegelman contributed the essay "Getting in Touch With My Inner Racist" in the September 1, 1997, issue of Mother Jones.

Spiegelman was comics editor of the New York Press in the early 1990s. He was comics editor of Details magazine in the late 1990s; in 1997 he began assigning comics journalism pieces in Details to a number of his cartoonist associates, including Joe Sacco, Peter Kuper, Ben Katchor, Peter Bagge, Charles Burns, Kaz, Kim Deitch, and Jay Lynch. The magazine published these works of journalism in comics form throughout 1998 and 1999, helping to legitimize the form in popular perception.

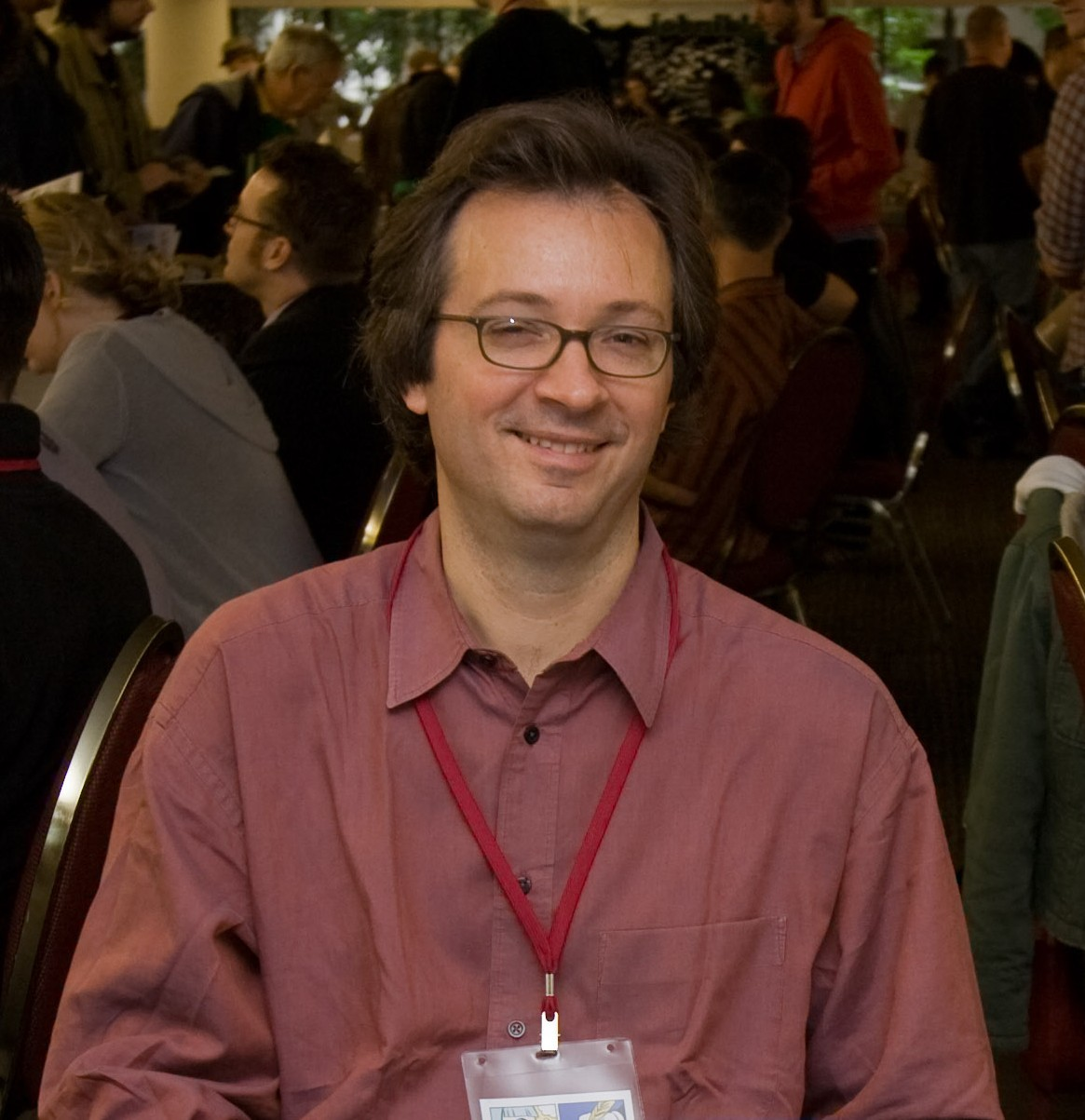
Editorial cartoonist Ted Rall begrudged Spiegelman's influence in New York cartooning circles.

Spiegelman's influence and connections in New York cartooning circles drew the ire of political cartoonist Ted Rall in 1999. In "The King of Comix", an article in The Village Voice, Rall accused Spiegelman of the power to "make or break" a cartoonist's career in New York, while denigrating Spiegelman as "a guy with one great book in him". Cartoonist Danny Hellman responded by sending a forged email under Rall's name to 30 professionals; the prank escalated until Rall launched a defamation suit against Hellman for $1.5 million. Hellman published a "Legal Action Comics" benefit book to cover his legal costs, to which Spiegelman contributed a back-cover cartoon in which he relieves himself on a Rall-shaped urinal.

In 1997, Spiegelman had his first children's book published, Open Me...I'm a Dog, with a narrator who tries to convince its readers that it is a dog via pop-ups and an attached leash. From 2000 to 2003, Spiegelman and Mouly edited three issues of the children's comics anthology Little Lit, with contributions from Raw alumni and children's book authors and illustrators.

=== Post–September 11 (2001–present) ===
Spiegelman lived close to the World Trade Center site, which was known as "Ground Zero" after the September 11 attacks that destroyed the World Trade Center. Immediately following the attacks Spiegelman and Mouly rushed to their daughter Nadja's school, where Spiegelman's anxiety served only to increase his daughter's apprehensiveness over the situation. Spiegelman and Mouly created a cover for the September 24 issue of The New Yorker which at first glance appears to be totally black, but upon close examination it reveals the silhouettes of the World Trade Center towers in a slightly darker shade of black. Mouly positioned the silhouettes so that the North Tower's antenna breaks into the "w" of The New Yorker's logo. The towers were printed in black on a slightly darker black field employing standard four-color printing inks with an overprinted clear varnish. In some situations, the ghost images only became visible when the magazine was tilted toward a light source. Spiegelman was critical of the Bush administration and the mass media over their handling of the September 11 attacks.

Spiegelman did not renew his New Yorker contract after 2003. He later quipped that he regretted leaving when he did, as he could have left in protest when the magazine ran a pro-invasion of Iraq piece later in the year. Spiegelman said his parting from The New Yorker was part of his general disappointment with "the widespread conformism of the mass media in the Bush era". He said he felt like he was in "internal exile" following the September 11 attacks as the U.S. media had become "conservative and timid" and did not welcome the provocative art that he felt the need to create. Nevertheless, Spiegelman asserted he left not over political differences, as had been widely reported, but because The New Yorker was not interested in doing serialized work, which he wanted to do with his next project.

Spiegelman responded to the September 11 attacks with In the Shadow of No Towers, commissioned by German newspaper Die Zeit, where it appeared throughout 2003. The Jewish Daily Forward was the only American periodical to serialize the feature. In the Shadow of No Towers is an autobiographical reflection on the tragic events and a partial political satire on the war on terror. The collected work appeared in September 2004 as an oversized (Note: The book edition of In the Shadow of No Towers measures 10 in × 14.5 in (25 cm × 37 cm).) board book of two-page spreads which had to be turned on end to read.

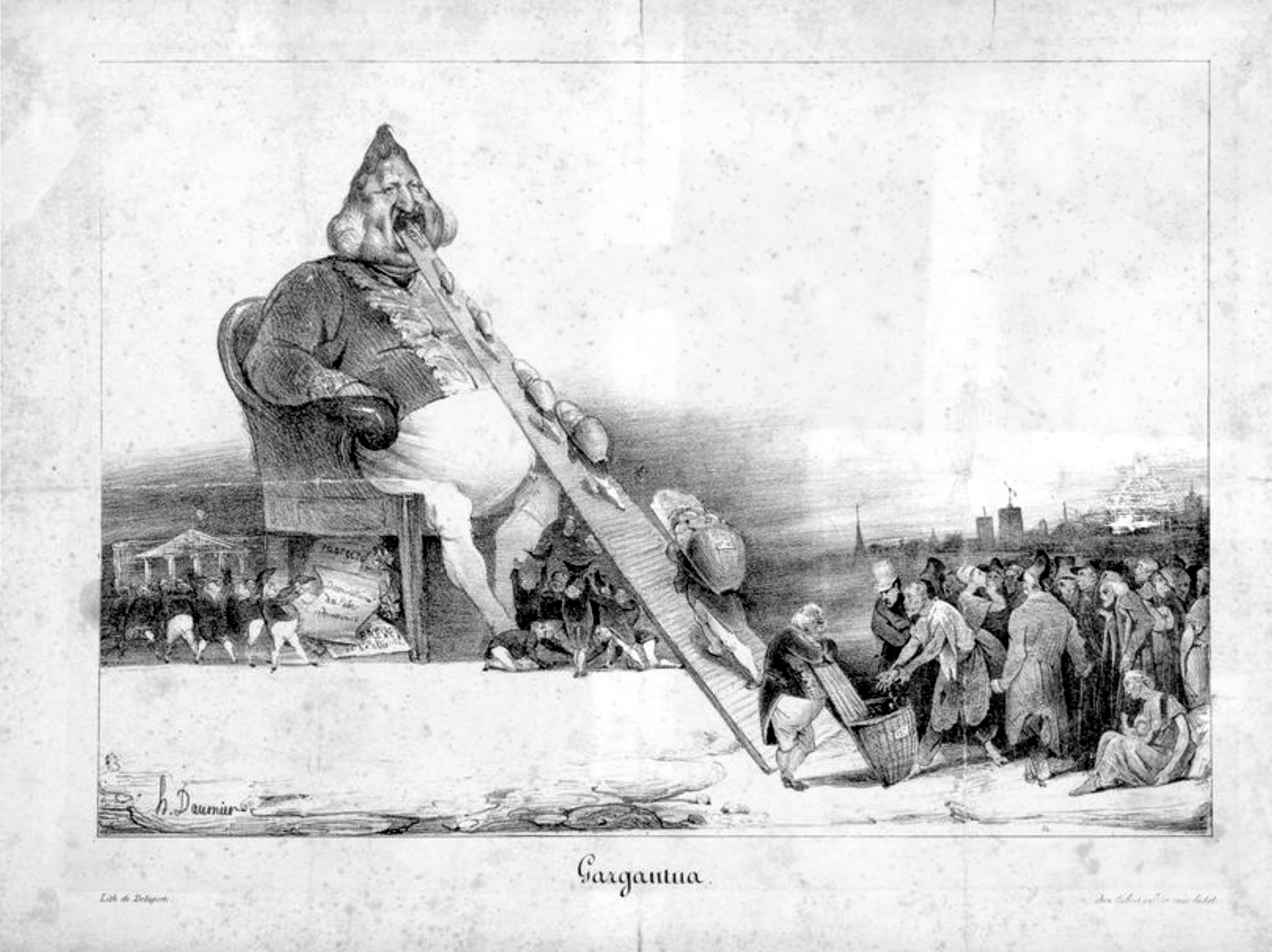
"Gargantua", a cartoon critical of King Louis Philippe I, led to the imprisonment of its author, Honoré Daumier.

In the June 2006 edition of Harper's Magazine Spiegelman had an article published on the Jyllands-Posten Muhammad cartoons controversy; some interpretations of Islamic law prohibit the depiction of Muhammad. The Canadian chain of booksellers Indigo refused to sell the issue. Called "Drawing Blood: Outrageous Cartoons and the Art of Outrage", the article surveyed the sometimes dire effect political cartooning has for its creators, ranging from Honoré Daumier, who spent time in prison for his satirical work; to George Grosz, who faced exile. To Indigo the article seemed to promote the continuance of racial caricature. An internal memo advised Indigo staff to tell people: "the decision was made based on the fact that the content about to be published has been known to ignite demonstrations around the world." In response to the cartoons, Iranian president Mahmoud Ahmadinejad promoted an Iranian cartoon contest seeking anti-Semitic cartoons. The organizers of the contest intended to highlight what they perceived as Western double standards surrounding anti-Semitism and Islamophobia. Spiegelman produced a cartoon of a line of prisoners being led to the gas chambers; one stops to look at the corpses around him and says, "Ha! Ha! Ha! What's really hilarious is that none of this is actually happening!"

To promote literacy in young children, Mouly encouraged publishers to publish comics for children. Disappointed by publishers' lack of response, from 2008 she self-published a line of easy readers called Toon Books, by artists such as Spiegelman, Renée French, and Rutu Modan, and promotes the books to teachers and librarians for their educational value. Spiegelman's Jack and the Box was one of the inaugural books in 2008.

In 2008 Spiegelman reissued Breakdowns in an expanded edition including "Portrait of the Artist as a Young %@&*!" an autobiographical strip that had been serialized in the Virginia Quarterly Review from 2005. A volume drawn from Spiegelman's sketchbooks, Be A Nose, appeared in 2009. In 2011, MetaMaus followed—a book-length analysis of Maus by Spiegelman and Hillary Chute with a DVD update of the earlier CD-ROM.

Library of America commissioned Spiegelman to edit the two-volume Lynd Ward: Six Novels in Woodcuts, which appeared in 2010, collecting all of Ward's wordless novels with an introduction and annotations by Spiegelman. The project led to a touring show in 2014 about wordless novels called Wordless! with live music by saxophonist Phillip Johnston. Art Spiegelman's Co-Mix: A Retrospective débuted at Angoulême in 2012 and by the end of 2014 had traveled to Paris, Cologne, Vancouver, New York, and Toronto. The book Co-Mix: A Retrospective of Comics, Graphics, and Scraps, which complemented the show, appeared in 2013.

In 2015, after six writers refused to sit on a panel at the PEN American Center in protest of the planned "freedom of expression courage award" for the satirical French periodical Charlie Hebdo following the shooting at its headquarters earlier in the year, Spiegelman agreed to be one of the replacement hosts, along with other names in comics such as writer Neil Gaiman. Spiegelman retracted a cover he had submitted to a Gaiman-edited "saying the unsayable" issue of New Statesman when the management declined to print a strip of Spiegelman's. The strip, "Notes from a First Amendment Fundamentalist", depicts Muhammad, and Spiegelman believed the rejection was censorship, though the magazine asserted it never intended to run the cartoon.

During the COVID-19 pandemic, Spiegelman worked on illustrating Street Cop, a dystopian short novel written by Robert Coover. Published in 2021, it tells the story of a crooked cop trying to solve a murder.

A biographical documentary called Art Spiegelman: Disaster Is My Muse premiered at DOC NYC in November 2024 and was released in theaters in 2025. The documentary covers the role that tragedy has played in inspiring Spiegelman's work, including the Holocaust, his mother's suicide, and the September 11 attacks. At a Q&A session after the screening, Spiegelman announced that he was working on a graphic novel about Gaza with Joe Sacco. He later clarified that the project wouldn't be a full graphic novel but a three-page comic based on phone conversations the two had had. The collaborative comic called "Never Again and Again" was released in February 2025 in The New York Review.

== Personal life ==
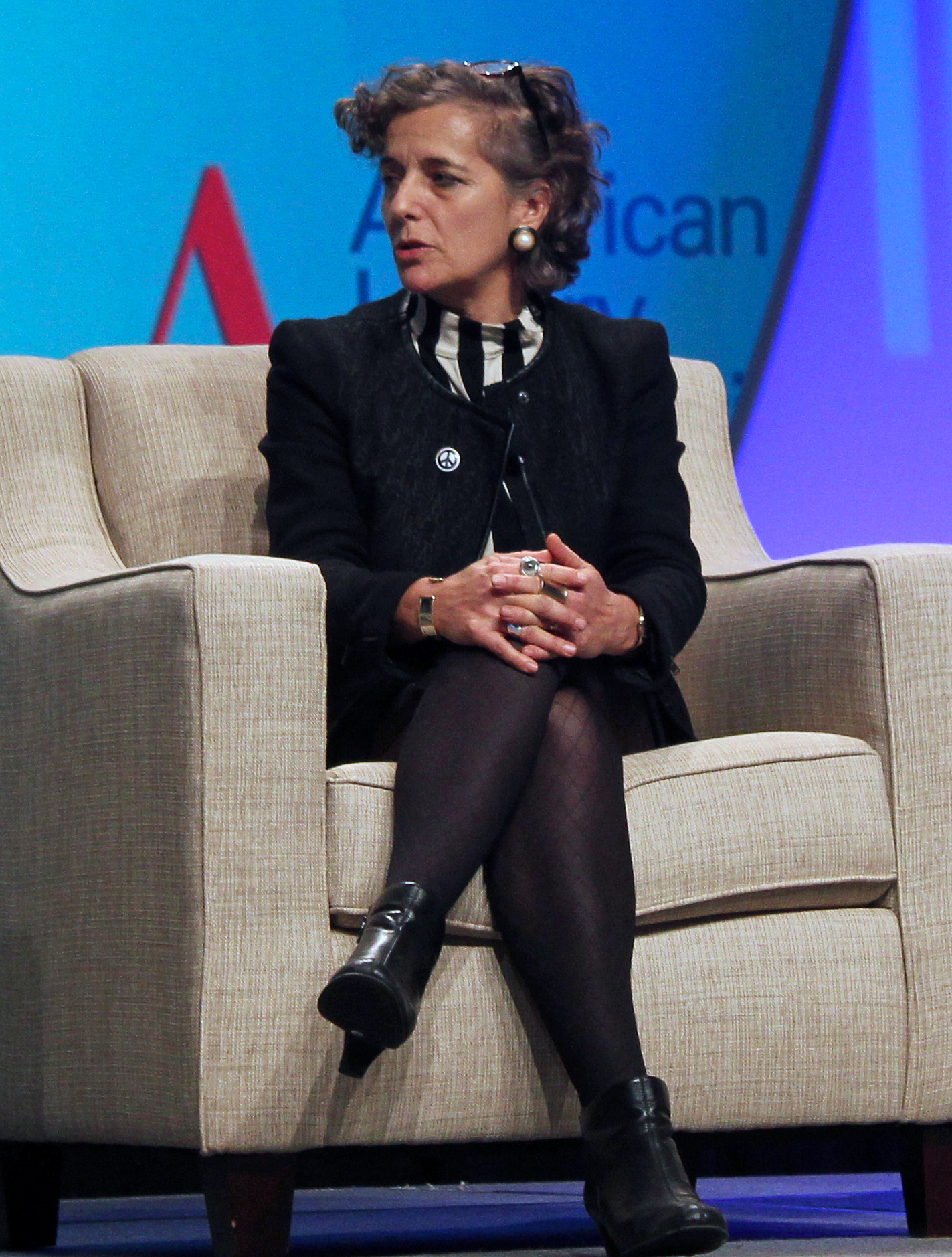
Spiegelman married Françoise Mouly in 1977 (pictured in 2015).

Spiegelman married Françoise Mouly on July 12, 1977, in a New York city hall ceremony. They remarried later in the year after Mouly converted to Judaism to please Spiegelman's father. Mouly and Spiegelman have two children together: a daughter, Nadja Rachel, born in 1987, and a son, Dashiell Alan, born in 1992.

== Style ==
All comic-strip drawings must function as diagrams, simplified picture-words that indicate more than they show.

— Art Spiegelman

Spiegelman suffers from a lazy eye, and thus lacks depth perception. He says his art style is "really a result of [his] deficiencies". His is a style of labored simplicity, with dense visual motifs which often go unnoticed upon first viewing. He sees comics as "very condensed thought structures", more akin to poetry than prose, which need careful, time-consuming planning that their seeming simplicity belies. Spiegelman's work prominently displays his concern with form, and pushing the boundaries of what is and is not comics. Early in the underground comix era, Spiegelman proclaimed to Robert Crumb, "Time is an illusion that can be shattered in comics! Showing the same scene from different angles freezes it in time by turning the page into a diagram—an orthographic projection!" His comics experiment with time, space, recursion, and representation. He uses the word "decode" to express the action of reading comics and sees comics as functioning best when expressed as diagrams, icons, or symbols.

Spiegelman has stated he does not see himself primarily as a visual artist, one who instinctively sketches or doodles. He has said he approaches his work as a writer as he lacks confidence in his graphic skills. He subjects his dialogue and visuals to constant revision—he reworked some dialogue balloons in Maus up to forty times. A critic in The New Republic compared Spiegelman's dialogue writing to a young Philip Roth in his ability "to make the Jewish speech of several generations sound fresh and convincing".

Spiegelman makes use of both old- and new-fashioned tools in his work. He prefers at times to work on paper on a drafting table, while at others he draws directly onto his computer using a digital pen and electronic drawing tablet, or mixes methods, employing scanners and printers.

=== Influences ===
Wordless woodcut novels such as those by Frans Masereel were an early influence.

Harvey Kurtzman has been Spiegelman's strongest influence as a cartoonist, editor, and promoter of new talent. Chief among his other early cartooning influences include Will Eisner, John Stanley's version of Little Lulu, Winsor McCay's Little Nemo, George Herriman's Krazy Kat, and Bernard Krigstein's short strip "Master Race".

In the 1960s Spiegelman read in comics fanzines about graphic artists such as Frans Masereel, who had made wordless novels in woodcut. The discussions in those fanzines about making the Great American Novel in comics later acted as inspiration for him. Justin Green's comic book Binky Brown Meets the Holy Virgin Mary (1972) motivated Spiegelman to open up and include autobiographical elements in his comics.

Spiegelman acknowledges Franz Kafka as an early influence, whom he says he has read since the age of 12, and lists Vladimir Nabokov, William Faulkner, and Gertrude Stein among the writers whose work "stayed with" him. He cites non-narrative avant-garde filmmakers from whom he has drawn heavily, including Ken Jacobs, Stan Brakhage, and Ernie Gehr, and other filmmakers such as Charlie Chaplin and the makers of The Twilight Zone.

== Beliefs ==
Spiegelman is a prominent advocate for the comics medium and comics literacy. He believes the medium echoes the way the human brain processes information. He has toured the U.S. with a lecture called "Comix 101", examining its history and cultural importance. He sees comics' low status in the late 20th century as having come down from where it was in the 1930s and 1940s, when comics "tended to appeal to an older audience of GIs and other adults". Following the advent of the censorious Comics Code Authority in the mid-1950s, Spiegelman sees comics' potential as having stagnated until the rise of underground comix in the late 1960s. He taught courses in the history and aesthetics of comics at schools such as the School of Visual Arts in New York. As co-editor of Raw, he helped propel the careers of younger cartoonists whom he mentored, such as Chris Ware, and published the work of his School of Visual Arts students, such as Kaz, Drew Friedman, and Mark Newgarden. Some of the work published in Raw was originally turned in as class assignments.

Spiegelman has described himself politically as "firmly on the left side of the secular-fundamentalist divide" and a "1st Amendment absolutist". As a supporter of free speech, Spiegelman is opposed to hate speech laws. He wrote a critique in Harper's on the controversial Muhammad cartoons in the Jyllands-Posten in 2006; the issue was banned from Indigo–Chapters stores in Canada. Spiegelman criticized American media for refusing to reprint the cartoons they reported on at the time of the Charlie Hebdo shooting in 2015.

Spiegelman is a non-practicing Jew and called Israel "a sad, failed idea" in 2011. He told Peanuts creator Charles Schulz he was not religious, but identified with the "alienated diaspora culture of Kafka and Freud ... what Stalin pejoratively called rootless cosmopolitanism".. In 2025 Spiegelman collaborated with friend Joe Sacco on a cartoon circulated in The Guardian in which he called the events in Palestine “kinda ‘genocidish,’” going beyond an “ethnic cleansing.” He stated he published the piece because he feared Maus could potentially be used as a recruitment tool for the Israeli military.

== Legacy ==
Maus looms large not only over Spiegelman's body of work, but over the comics medium itself. While Spiegelman was far from the first to do autobiography in comics, critics such as James Campbell considered Maus the work that popularized it. The bestseller has been widely written about in the popular press and academia—the quantity of its critical literature far outstrips that of any other work of comics. It has been examined from a great variety of academic viewpoints, though most often by those with little understanding of Maus' context in the history of comics. While Maus has been credited with lifting comics from popular culture into the world of high art in the public imagination, criticism has tended to ignore its deep roots in popular culture, roots that Spiegelman has intimate familiarity with and has devoted considerable time to promote.

Spiegelman's belief that comics are best expressed in a diagrammatic or iconic manner has had a particular influence on formalists such as Chris Ware and his former student Scott McCloud. In 2005, the September 11-themed New Yorker cover placed sixth on the top ten of magazine covers of the previous 40 years by the American Society of Magazine Editors. Spiegelman has inspired numerous cartoonists to take up the graphic novel as a means of expression, including Marjane Satrapi.

A joint ZDF–BBC documentary, Art Spiegelman's Maus, was televised in 1987. Spiegelman, Mouly, and many of the Raw artists appeared in the documentary Comic Book Confidential in 1988. Spiegelman's comics career was also covered in an Emmy-nominated PBS documentary, Serious Comics: Art Spiegelman, produced by Patricia Zur for WNYC-TV in 1994. Spiegelman played himself in the 2007 episode "Husbands and Knives" of the animated television series The Simpsons with fellow comics creators Daniel Clowes and Alan Moore. A European documentary, Art Spiegelman, Traits de Mémoire, appeared in 2010 and later in English under the title The Art of Spiegelman, directed by Clara Kuperberg and Joelle Oosterlinck and mainly featuring interviews with Spiegelman and those around him.

=== Awards ===
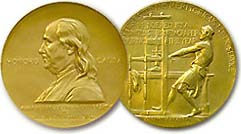
Maus was the first graphic novel to win a Pulitzer Prize.

- 1982: Playboy Editorial Award, Best Comic Strip
- 1982: Yellow Kid Award, Lucca, Italy, for Foreign Author
- 1983: Print, Regional Design Award
- 1984: Print, Regional Design Award
- 1985: Print, Regional Design Award
- 1986: Joel M. Cavior, Jewish Writing
- 1987: Inkpot Award
- 1988: Angoulême International Comics Festival, France, Prize for Best Comic Book, for Maus
- 1988: Urhunden Prize, Sweden, Best Foreign Album, for Maus
- 1990: Guggenheim Fellowship.
- 1990: Max & Moritz Prize, Erlangen, Germany, Special Prize, for Maus
- 1992: Special Pulitzer Prize, for Maus
- 1992: Eisner Award, Best Graphic Album (reprint), for Maus
- 1992: Harvey Award, Best Graphic Album of Previously Published Work, for Maus
- 1992: Los Angeles Times, Book Prize for Fiction for Maus II
- 1993: Angoulême International Comics Festival, Prize for Best Comic Book, for Maus II
- 1993: Sproing Award, Norway, Best Foreign Album, for Maus
- 1993: Urhunden Prize, Best Foreign Album, for Maus II
- 1995: Binghamton University (formerly Harpur College), honorary Doctorate of Letters.
- 1999: Eisner Award, inducted into the Hall of Fame
- 2005: French government, Chevalier of the Ordre des Arts et des Lettres
- 2005: Time magazine, one of the "Top 100 Most Influential People"
- 2009: Festival B.D. Sollies-Ville, Grands Prix
- 2011: Angoulême International Comics Festival, Grand Prix
- 2011: National Jewish Book Award for MetaMaus: A Look Inside a Modern Classic, Maus
- 2015: American Academy of Arts and Letters membership
- 2018: The Edward MacDowell Medal
- 2020: The Great Immigrants Award by the Carnegie Corporation of New York

== Bibliography ==
=== Author ===
- Tijuana Bibles: Art and Wit in America's Forbidden Funnies, 1930s-1950s (Introductory Essay: Those Dirty Little Comics) (1977)
- Breakdowns: From Maus to Now, an Anthology of Strips (1977)
- Maus (1991)
- The Wild Party (1994)
- Open Me, I'm A Dog (1995)
- Jack Cole and Plastic Man: Forms Stretched to Their Limits (2001)
- In the Shadow of No Towers (2004)
- Breakdowns: Portrait of the Artist as a Young %@&*! (2008)
- Jack and the Box (2008)
- Be a Nose (2009)
- MetaMaus (2011)
- Co-Mix: A Retrospective of Comics, Graphics, and Scraps (2013)
- Street Cop (with Robert Coover) (2021)
- The St. Louis Refugee Ship Blues, Art Spiegelman recounts a sad story 70 years later.

=== Editor ===
- Short Order Comix (1972–74)
- Whole Grains: A Book of Quotations (with Bob Schneider, 1973)
- Arcade (with Bill Griffith, 1975–76)
- Raw (with Françoise Mouly, 1980–91)
- City of Glass (graphic novel adaptation by David Mazzucchelli of the Paul Auster novel, 1994)
- The Narrative Corpse (1995)
- Little Lit (with Françoise Mouly, 2000–2003)
- The TOON Treasury of Classic Children's Comics (with Françoise Mouly, 2008)
- Lynd Ward: Six Novels in Woodcuts (2010)
