= André Schiffrin =

American book publisher (1935–2013)

- Born: June 14, 1935; Paris, France
- Died: December 1, 2013 (aged 78); Paris, France
- Citizenship: France; United States
- Education: Yale University; University of Cambridge
- Occupations: Publisher; editor; writer
- Spouse: Maria Elena de la Iglesia (m. 1961)
- Children: Anya Schiffrin, Natalia Schiffrin

André Schiffrin (June 14, 1935 – December 1, 2013) was a French-American author, publisher and political activist.

== Life ==
Schiffrin was born in Paris, the son of Jacques Schiffrin, a Russian Jew who emigrated to France and briefly enjoyed success there as publisher of the Bibliothèque de la Pléiade, which he founded, and which was bought by Gallimard, until he was dismissed because of the anti-Jewish laws enforced by the Vichy regime. Jacques Schiffrin and his family had to flee and eventually found refuge in the United States. As the younger Schiffrin recalls in his autobiography, A Political Education: Coming of Age in Paris and New York (2007), he thus experienced life in two countries as a child of a European Jewish intellectual family. He attended Yale University, where he won the Alpheus Henry Snow Prize, and Clare College, Cambridge, where he studied English on a Mellon Fellowship for two years and edited the student literary magazine Granta.

As a socialist, Schiffrin opposed both the Soviet invasion of Czechoslovakia and the U.S. war in Vietnam. He was one of the founders of the Student League for Industrial Democracy (1946-1959), the organization that became Students for a Democratic Society. In 1968, he signed the "Writers and Editors War Tax Protest" pledge, vowing to refuse tax payments in protest against the Vietnam War.

Schiffrin was the managing director of publishing at Pantheon Books, where he was partially responsible for introducing the works of Boris Pasternak, Michel Foucault and others to American readers. Schiffrin's 28-year period at Pantheon, a division of Random House, came to an end in 1990 when CEO Alberto Vitale fired him because of a conflict over the division's losses and the downsizing that Vitale wished to make.

In 1992, Schiffrin, with former Pantheon colleague Diane Wachtell, established the non-profit The New Press, explaining that he did so because of economic trends that prevented him from publishing the serious books he thought should be made available. Schiffrin discussed what he regarded as the crisis in western publishing in his book The Business of Books: How the International Conglomerates Took Over Publishing and Changed the Way We Read (2000).

In 2011, Schiffrin was made a Chevalier of the Légion d'honneur by the French government.

Schiffrin's daughter, journalist Anya Schiffrin, is married to the economist and Nobel Prize winner Joseph Stiglitz. His daughter Natalia is married to international lawyer Philippe Sands.

Schiffrin died on December 1, 2013, in Paris from pancreatic cancer.

== Works ==
- L'édition sans éditeurs (1999), ISBN 2-913372-02-3
- The Business of Books: How the International Conglomerates Took Over Publishing and Changed the Way We Read (2000), ISBN 1-85984-362-X (Hardback ISBN 1-85984-763-3)
  - Published in German as Verlage ohne Verleger. Über die Zukunft der Bücher. Mit einem Nachwort von Klaus Wagenbach, translated by Gerd Burger; Berlin: Verlag Klaus Wagenbach, 2000, ISBN 3-8031-2387-9
- Le contrôle de la parole (2005), ISBN 2-913372-35-X
- A Political Education: Coming of Age in Paris and New York (Melville House Publishing, 2007), ISBN 1-933633-15-8
  - Published in French as Allers-retours : Paris-New York, un itinéraire politique (2007), ISBN 2-86746-447-1
  - Published in German as Paris, New York und zurück. Politische Lehrjahre eines Verlegers, translated by Andrea Marenzeller; Berlin: Matthes & Seitz, 2010, ISBN 978-3-88221-685-1
- L'argent et les mots (2010), ISBN 978-2-35872-006-9
- Words and Money (Verso Books, 2010), ISBN 978-1-84467-680-4

Although there exist no English versions of L'édition sans éditeurs or Le contrôle de la parole, there is some overlap of content between The Business of Books and the former.

== See also ==
- List of English-language book publishing companies
