= Alan Lightman =

American physicist, writer, and novelist (born 1948)

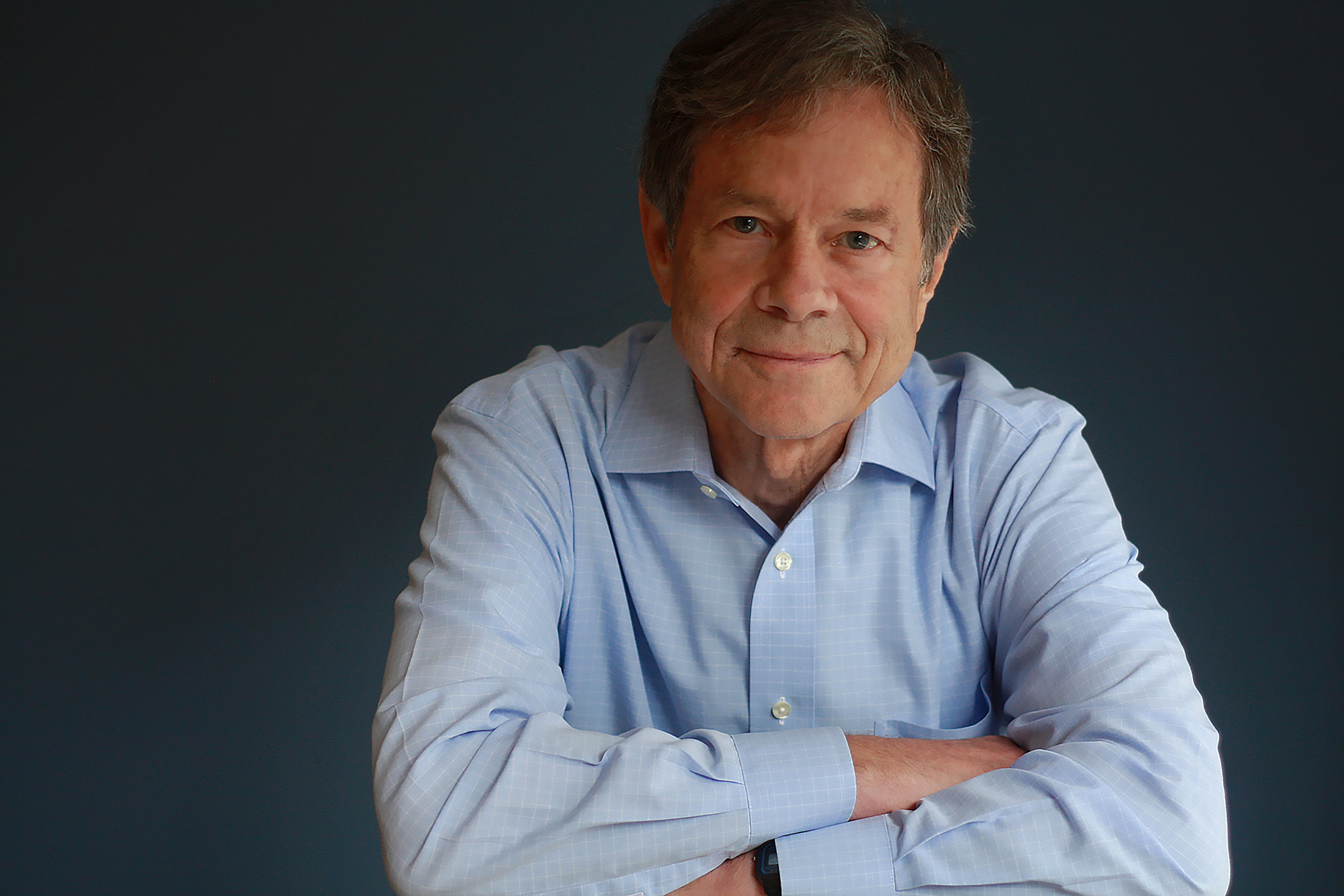
- Lightman in 2022
- Born: November 28, 1948 (age 77); Memphis, Tennessee, U.S.
- Education: Princeton University (BA); California Institute of Technology (PhD)
- Scientific career
- Fields: Physics; Creative writing
- Workplaces: Massachusetts Institute of Technology
- Thesis: I. Time-dependent accretion disks around compact objects. II. Theoretical frameworks for analyzing and testing gravitation theories (1974)
- Doctoral advisor: Kip S. Thorne

Alan Paige Lightman (born November 28, 1948) is an American physicist, writer, and social entrepreneur. He has served on the faculties of Harvard University and Massachusetts Institute of Technology (MIT) and is currently a professor of the practice of the humanities at MIT. He is a contributing writer for The Atlantic magazine.

Lightman was one of the first persons at MIT to hold a joint faculty position in both the sciences and the humanities. His thinking and writing explore the intersection of the sciences and humanities, especially the multilogues among science, philosophy, and religion.

Lightman is a past member of the United Nations’ Scientific Advisory Board. The purpose of this Board is to advise UN leaders on breakthroughs in science and technology and mitigate potential risks, including ethical and social issues.

Lightman is the author of the international bestseller Einstein's Dreams, and his novel The Diagnosis was a finalist for the National Book Award. He is also the founder of Harpswell, a nonprofit organization whose mission is to advance a new generation of women leaders in Southeast Asia.

Lightman hosts the public-television series Searching: Our Quest for Meaning in the Age of Science. He has also appeared in the documentaries 306 Hollywood, directed by Elan and Jonathan Bogerin, and A Trip to Infinity, directed by Drew Takahashi and Jon Halperin.

He has received six honorary doctoral degrees.

== Early life and education ==
Alan Lightman was born and grew up in Memphis, Tennessee. His father Richard Lightman was a movie theater owner and played a major role in desegregating movie theaters in the South in 1962. His mother Jeanne Garretson was a dance teacher and Braille typist.

Lightman graduated from White Station High School. He graduated Phi Beta Kappa with an A.B. in physics from Princeton University in 1970 after completing a senior thesis, titled "Design and construction of a gas scintillation detector capable of time-of-flight measurements of fission isomer decays", under the supervision of Robert Naumann. He then received a Ph.D. in physics from the California Institute of Technology in 1974 after completing a doctoral dissertation, titled "I. Time-dependent accretion disks around compact objects. II. Theoretical frameworks for analyzing and testing gravitation theories", under the supervision of Kip S. Thorne.

== Career ==
Lightman was a postdoctoral fellow in astrophysics at Cornell University (1974–1976); an assistant professor at Harvard University (1976–1979); a senior research scientist at the Center for Astrophysics | Harvard & Smithsonian (1979–1989); and then a professor at the Massachusetts Institute of Technology (MIT) (1989– ). During this period he began publishing poetry in small magazines and eventually essays in Science 80, the Smithsonian, The New Yorker, and other magazines.

At MIT, in the mid-1990s Lightman chaired the committee that established the communication requirement for all undergraduates. In 2001, he cofounded the graduate program in science writing. In 2005, he was a cofounder of the Catalyst Collaborative at MIT, a partnership between MIT and Central Square Theater, in Cambridge, that sponsors plays involving science and the culture of science.

In August 2023, Lightman was appointed a member of the United Nations’ Scientific Advisory Board.

== Scientific work ==
In his scientific work, Lightman has made contributions to the theory of astrophysical processes under extreme temperatures and densities. In particular, his research has focused on relativistic gravitation theory, the structure and behavior of accretion disks, stellar dynamics, radiative processes, and relativistic plasmas. Some of his significant achievements are his discovery, with Douglas Eardley, of a structural instability in orbiting disks of matter, called accretion disks, that form around massive condensed objects such as black holes, with wide application in astronomy; his proof, with David L. Lee, that all gravitation theories obeying the Weak Equivalence Principle (the experimentally verified fact that all objects fall with the same acceleration in a gravitational field) must be metric theories of gravity, that is, must describe gravity as a geometrical warping of time and space; his calculations, with Stuart L. Shapiro, of the distribution of stars around a massive black hole and the rate of destruction of those stars by the hole; his discovery, independently of Roland Svensson of Sweden, of the negative heat behavior of optically thin, hot thermal plasmas dominated by electron-positron pairs, that is, the result that adding energy to thin hot gases causes their temperature to decrease rather than increase; and his work on unusual radiation processes, such as unsaturated inverse Compton scattering, in thermal media, also with wide application in astrophysics.

In 1990 he chaired the science panel of the National Academy of Sciences Astronomy and Astrophysics Survey Committee. He is a past chair of the High Energy Division of the American Astronomical Society.

== Literary work ==
Lightman's essays, articles, and stories have appeared in The Atlantic, Harper's Magazine, Nautilus, The New Yorker, The New York Times and other publications. His books include:

=== Fiction ===
- Einstein's Dreams (1993)
- Good Benito (1995)
- The Diagnosis (2000)
- Reunion (2003)
- Ghost (2007)
- Song of Two Worlds (poetry) (2009)
- Mr g (2012)
- Three Flames (2019)

=== Memoir ===
- Screening Room (2015)

=== Collections of essays and fables ===
- Time Travel and Papa Joe’s Pipe (1984)
- A Modern Day Yankee in a Connecticut Court (1986)
- Dance for Two (1996)
- Best American Essays 2000, (Guest Editor) (2000)
- Living with the Genie, (coedited with Christina Desser, and Daniel Sarewitz) (2003)
- Heart of the Horse (with Juliet von Otteren) (2004)
- A Sense of the Mysterious (2005)
- The Accidental Universe (2014)
- Probable Impossibilities (2021)

=== Books on science ===
- Problem Book in Relativity and Gravitation (with W. H. Press, R. H. Price, and S. A. Teukolsky) (1975)
- Radiative Processes in Astrophysics (with G. B. Rybicki) (1979)
- Origins: the Lives and Worlds of Modern Cosmologists (with R. Brawer) (1990)
- Ancient Light. Our Changing View of the Universe (1991)
- Great Ideas in Physics (1992, new edition in 2000)
- Time for the Stars. Astronomy for the 1990s (1992)
- The Discoveries: Great Breakthroughs in 20th Century Science (2005)
- The Transcendent Brain: Spirituality in the Age of Science (2023)
- The Miraculous from the Material (2024)
- The Shape of Wonder: How Scientists Live, Think, and Work (2025)

=== General nonfiction ===
- Searching for Stars on an Island in Maine (2018)
- In Praise of Wasting Time (2018)

=== Selected articles and essays ===
A more complete list of Lightman's essays and articles can be found at his MIT faculty page

- “Restricted Proof That the Weak Equivalence Principle Implies the Einstein Equivalence Principle” (with D. L. Lee), Physical Review D, vol. 8, pg. 364 (1973)
- “Black Holes in Binary Systems: Instability of Disk Accretion” (with D. M. Eardley), Astrophysical Journal Letters, vol. 187, pg. L1 (1974)
- “The Distribution and Consumption Rate of Stars Around a Massive Collapsed Object (with S. L. Shapiro), Astrophysical Journal, vol. 211, pg. 244 (1977)
- “Relativistic Plasmas: Pair Processes and Equilibria,” Astrophysical Journal, vol. 253, pg. 842 (1982)
- “What’s Happening in the Cores of Globular Clusters?” Astrophysical Journal Letters, vol. 263, pg. L19 (1982)
- "When Do Anomalies Begin?" (with Owen Gingerich), Science, February 7, 1992
- “The Contradictory Genius,” The New York Review of Books, March 20, 1997.
- “The Public Intellectual,” MIT Forum (1999)
- “Red, White, and Bamboo,” (Letter from Cambodia) The New York Times, July 5, 2005
- Lightman, Alan (October 2, 2011). "Does God Exist?". Salon. Archived from the original on October 18, 2011.
- “The Accidental Universe” Harper's, December 2011,
- “The Temporary Universe Tin House, issue 51, Spring 2012
- “Our Lonely Home in Nature”, The New York Times, May 2, 2014
- “What Came Before the Big Bang?” Harpers, January 2016
- "The Nature of Things: Why I Love Physics" Princeton Alumni Weekly, February 19, 2016
- “Fact and Faith: Why Science and Spirituality are not Incompatible,” BBC Focus, 5, April 2018
- “The Coronavirus is a Reminder of Something Lost Long Ago,” The Atlantic, April 1, 2020
- "It Seems that I Know How the Universe Originated," The Atlantic, February 8, 2021
- "Where Science and Miracles Meet," The Atlantic, March 22, 2021
- "The Dark Ages are Back" The Atlantic, April 30, 2025
- "The Ordinary Miracle of Existing" The Atlantic, June 2, 2026
- "My Childhood in Science" Scientific American, June 16, 2026

== Nonprofit work ==
In 2003, Lightman made his first trip to Southeast Asia, to Cambodia. There he met a Cambodian lawyer named Veasna Chea Leth who told him that when she had been going to university in Phnom Penh in the mid-1990s, she and a handful of female students lived underneath the university building, in the two-meter crawl space between the bottom of the building and the mud, because there was no housing for female university students. Lightman and Chea together conceived the idea of a dormitory for female university students in Phnom Penh. That first facility was completed in 2006, the first dormitory for college women in the country.

During this work, Lightman founded Harpswell, a nonprofit organization whose mission is to support emerging women leaders in Southeast Asia. Harpswell now operates two centers in Phnom Penh. In addition to providing housing, food, and medical care, the facility operates a program in leadership skills and critical thinking. The in-house program includes English instruction, computer literacy, debate, analytical writing, comparative genocide studies, strategies for civic engagement, leadership training, and discussion and analysis of national and international events. As of fall 2023, the Cambodian program has about 250 graduates and about 76 current students.

In 2017, Harpswell launched a new program in leadership for young professional women from all ten countries of Southeast Asia: Laos, Myanmar, Thailand, Vietnam, Cambodia, Malaysia, the Philippines, Indonesia, Singapore, and Brunei, plus Nepal. The Harpswell-ASEAN Women's Leadership Summit consists of a ten-day summer program in Penang Malaysia, with lectures and workshops in critical thinking, civic engagement, Southeast Asian geography and society, technology and communication, and gender issues. The program has a total of 25 participants each year, who are flown to Penang from their respective countries.

== Major awards and honors ==
- Honorary doctoral degrees from Bowdoin College (2005), Memphis College of Art (2006), University of Maryland (2006), University of Massachusetts (2010), Colgate University (2017), and Skidmore College (2019)
- Certificate of Special Congressional Recognition on September 23, 2019, from the United States House of Representatives for contributions to the global Cambodian community.
- Inaugural winner of 2017 Humanism in Literature award, given by Humanist Hub of Harvard
- 2016 Distinguished Artist of the Year Award from the St. Botolph Club of Boston
- 2016 Sydney Award for the best magazine essays of 2011, for "What Came Before the Big Bang?", awarded by David Brooks of The New York Times
- Screening Room (2015) named by the Washington Post as one of the best books of the year
- 2011 Sydney Award for the best magazine essays of 2011, for "The Accidental Universe," awarded by David Brooks of The New York Times
- Gold Medal for humanitarian service to Cambodia, awarded by the government of Cambodia in 2008
- 2006 John P. McGovern Science and Society Award, given by Sigma Xi
- Finalist for the 2005 Massachusetts Book Award for A Sense of the Mysterious
- 2003 Distinguished Alumnus Award from the California Institute of Technology
- Finalist for the 2000 National Book Award in fiction for The Diagnosis
- 1998 Gyorgy Kepes Prize in the Arts from MIT's Council for the Arts
- Elected fellow of the American Academy of Arts and Sciences in 1996
- American Institute of Physics Andrew Gemant Award for linking science to the humanities in 1996
- Literary Light of the Boston Public Library in 1995
- 1990 Association of American Publishers’ Award for Origins as the best book of the year in physical science
