= In the Shadow of No Towers =

Comics by Art Spiegelman

- Cover of In the Shadow of No Towers Hardcover

Publication information
- Publisher: Viking Adult
- Format: Comic strip Board book
- Publication date: 2002–2004

Creative team
- Created by: Art Spiegelman

Collected editions
- In the Shadow of No Towers: ISBN 0-670-91541-6

In the Shadow of No Towers is a 2004 work of comics by American cartoonist Art Spiegelman. It is about Spiegelman's reaction to the September 11 attacks on the World Trade Center in 2001. It was originally serialized as a comic strip in the German newspaper Die Zeit from 2002 until 2004, and was collected as an oversized board book in 2004 with early American comic strips as supplementary material.

In 2011, Mode Records released a 5.1 multichannel DVD recording (Mode 236) of Spiegelman's book, including some of his text and artwork in the booklet, with music by Marco Cappelli, and narration by John Turturro and Enzo Salomone.

== Overview ==
The book evolved from Spiegelman's experiences during the September 11 terrorist attacks. Spiegelman has said that the book was a way to reclaim himself from the post-traumatic stress disorder he suffered after the attacks.

It also has many references to Spiegelman's Maus comics, for example one in which Art said that the smoke in Manhattan smelled just like Vladek said the smoke in the concentration camps smelled. The Spiegelman narrator often switches to a depiction of himself in mouse form.

It was published by the German newspaper Die Zeit after Spiegelman was unable to secure publication in any major American outlet. In Britain, excerpts were published in The Independent. The comic was serialised in full in the London Review of Books from March-September 2003. A segment also appeared in 2004 as part of the Actus Tragicus comics album Dead Herring Comics.

In 2004, the series of ten strips and a supplement of reprints of turn-of-the-20th-century comic strips such as The Katzenjammer Kids and The Yellow Kid were collected and published together as a book by Viking Books. In the Shadow of No Towers was selected by The New York Times as one of the 100 Notable Books of 2004.

== In popular culture ==
In the Shadow of No Towers is the inspiration for a symphony by Mohammed Fairouz.

== See also ==
- September 11, 2001 attacks in popular culture
