= Ben Katchor =

American cartoonist and illustrator (born 1951)

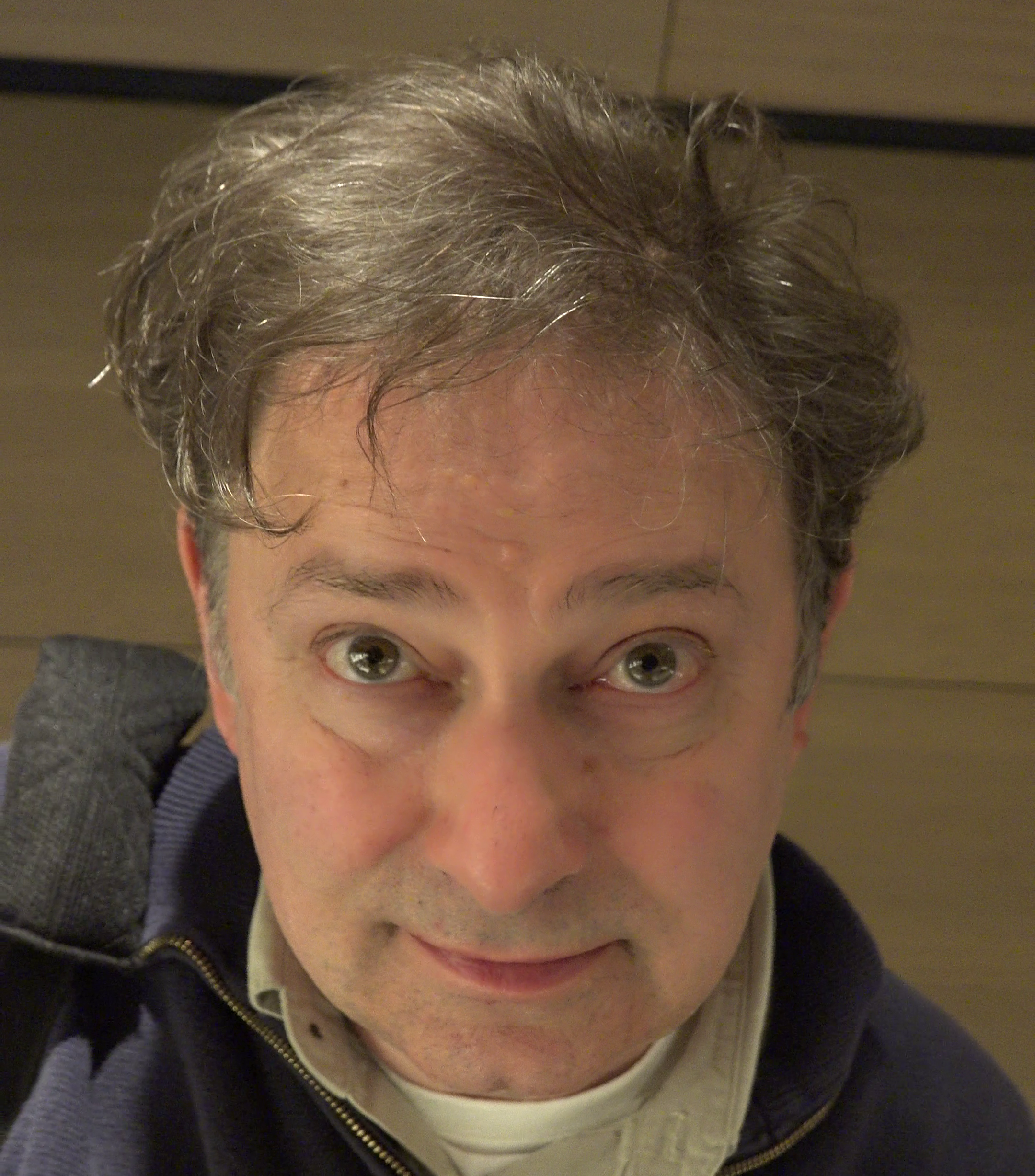
- Katchor in 2016
- Born: Benjamin Katchor; 19 November 1951 (age 75) New York City, U.S.
- Area: Cartoonist
- Notable works: Julius Knipl, Real Estate Photographer
- Awards: Guggenheim Fellowship, 1995; MacArthur Fellowship, 2000

Ben Katchor (born November 19, 1951) is an American cartoonist and illustrator best known for the comic strip Julius Knipl, Real Estate Photographer. He has contributed comics and drawings to The Forward, The New Yorker, Metropolis, and weekly newspapers in the United States. A Guggenheim Fellowship and MacArthur Fellowship recipient, Katchor was described by author Michael Chabon as "the creator of the last great American comic strip."

== Career ==
=== Cartooning ===
Katchor contributed occasional illustrations while on staff for The Kingsman, the student newspaper of Brooklyn College, and he was an early contributor to RAW. He edited and published two issues of Picture Story, which featured his own work, with articles and stories by Peter Blegvad, Jerry Moriarty, Mark Beyer and Martin Millard.

In 1993, Katchor was the subject of a lengthy profile by Lawrence Weschler in The New Yorker and an extended essay by John Crowley in The Yale Review (1998).

His comics have been translated into French, Italian, German, Spanish and Japanese.

Katchor wrote and illustrated a "weeklong electronic journal" for Slate in 1997, he contributed articles to the now-defunct Civilization: The Magazine of the Library of Congress, did illustrations for the New Yorker and occasionally The New York Times Book Review.

Katchor was the guest editor of the 2017 edition of Best American Comics.

==== Strips ====
- Julius Knipl – Paints a fictional version of New York City with a decidedly Jewish/urban sensibility. Julius Knipl has been published in several book collections including Cheap Novelties: The Pleasure of Urban Decay (Penguin), Julius Knipl, Real Estate Photographer: Stories, with a foreword by Michael Chabon (Little, Brown & Co.), and The Beauty Supply District (Pantheon Books).
- The Cardboard Valise – A weekly strip chronicling the travels of Emile Delilah to a variety of imaginary nations. It was expanded, collected and published by Pantheon Books in 2011.
- Hotel & Farm – A weekly strip dealing, over alternating weeks, with hotel culture and agriculture. It appeared in weekly newspapers in the U.S.
- Shoehorn Technique – A weekly strip exploring the possibilities of human mobility across socio-economic strata in an imaginary city. Temporarily suspended after 52-weeks.
- Metropolis series – Since 1998, Katchor has produced a monthly strip for the back-page of Metropolis magazine dealing with the topics of architecture and urban design. Katchor's operas The Carbon Copy Building and The Slug Bearers of Kayrol Island were adapted from strips in this series. The strips were collected in the 2013 book Hand-Drying in America and other stories (Pantheon Books). This series ended in December 2016.
- "Our Mental Age" – An online comic-strip series started 2017.
- The Dairy Restaurant (2020), an illustrated history of the dairy restaurant with an online addendum.

=== Theater ===
Katchor has written several works of musical theater, including The Rosenbach Company (a tragi-comedy about the life and times of Abe Rosenbach, the preeminent rare-book dealer of the 20th century); The Slug Bearers of Kayrol Island, or, The Friends of Dr. Rushower, an absurdist romance about the chemical emissions and addictive soft-drinks of a ruined tropical factory-island; A Checkroom Romance, about the culture and architecture of coat-checkrooms, and Up From the Stacks, about a page working the stacks of the New York Public Library c.1970. All feature music by Mark Mulcahy. In 1999, he collaborated with Bang on a Can on an opera entitled, The Carbon Copy Building.

==== Teaching ====
Katchor has been an associate professor at Parsons The New School since 2007. He gives "illustrated lectures" at colleges and museums accompanied by slide projections of his work. Since 2012 he has run the New York Comics & Picture-story Symposium, a weekly symposium for the study of text-image work.

== Awards ==
Katchor won an Obie Award for his collaboration with Bang on a Can on The Carbon Copy Building, a "comic book opera" based on his writings and drawings that premiered in 1999. The same year, he was the subject of Pleasures of Urban Decay, a documentary by the San Francisco filmmaker Samuel Ball. The first cartoonist to receive a MacArthur Fellowship, Katchor has also received a Guggenheim Fellowship and is a fellow of the American Academy in Berlin.

== Bibliography ==
- Picture Story 2 (editor and contributor) (self-published, 1986)
- Cheap Novelties: The Pleasures of Urban Decay (Penguin, 1991)
  - (Drawn and Quarterly, 2016) ISBN 9781770462632
- Julius Knipl, Real Estate Photographer: Stories (Little, Brown & Co., 1996)
- The Jew of New York (Pantheon Books, 1998)
- Julius Knipl, Real Estate Photographer: The Beauty Supply District (Pantheon Books, 2000) ISBN 9780316482943
- The Cardboard Valise (Pantheon Books, 2011) ISBN 9780375421143
- Hand-Drying in America (Pantheon Books, 2013) ISBN 9780307906908
- "Conversations: Ben Katchor," edited by Ian Gordon (Univ. Press of Mississippi, 2018)
- The Dairy Restaurant, an illustrated history, March 2020. ISBN 9780805242195
- Hotel and Farm (Pantheon Books, 2026) ISBN 9780307906915
