= 2006 in comics =

Notable events of 2006 in comics.

== Events ==
=== January ===
- January 1: Newsweek offers a look back at 2005 through editorial cartoons.
- January 1: After 109 years of continuous publication the longest-running comic strip of all time, The Katzenjammer Kids (originally created by Harold H. Knerr) comes to an end.
- January 2: Gabrielle, AKA 'Gaby', Scaon-Possompes, director of the comics museum Musée de la BD in Angoulême, is honoured with the title Chevalier des Arts et des Lettres.
- January 2: The Cincinnati Enquirer cartoonist Jim Borgman starts a blog to detail his creative process.
- January 3:
  - Todd Hignite interviews Brian Walker, co-curator of the Masters of American Comics exhibition currently on at the Hammer Museum and the Museum of Contemporary Art, Los Angeles.
  - The London Metropolitan Police refuse to distribute Cops and Robbers, a comic book detailing first hand stories of criminals embracing the Christian faith. The police cite the book's failure to cover a multitude of faiths as reason.
- January 5: 2005 Pulitzer Prize winner Nick Anderson is to move from the Louisville Courier-Journal, where he thrived, to the Houston Chronicle.
- January 6:
  - Richard Branson is launching Virgin Comics alongside mystical self-help guru Deepak Chopra, a company to be based in and cater for India. Film director John Woo is reported to be developing a series for the company.
  - Christianity Today use Bill Watterson's position on licensing to contrast with the marketing of Aslan in the wake of the current film based upon The Lion, the Witch and the Wardrobe.
  - Neil Gaiman is interviewed by 92nd Street Y.
- January 8:
  - Jeet Heer appraises Daydreams and Nightmares, a new collection of work by Winsor McCay, for The Boston Globe.
  - Tom Spurgeon interviews Matt Madden in the wake of the publication of his new work 99 Ways to Tell a Story.
- January 9:
  - The jury selects Etienne Davodeau's Les Mauvaises Gens to receive the Prix du Public at the Angoulême International Comics Festival.
  - Bob Greenberger is let go from his position as Collected Editions Editor by DC Comics.
  - United Kingdom television channel Five are to broadcast a series based on the comic strip Rupert the Bear. The series is being produced by Cosgrove Hall.
  - Jean-François Kieffer's Loupio series has been awarded Le prix de la BD chretienne Francophone, the prize awarded by a jury composed from representatives of Christian denominations.
  - Hasbro and Marvel Comics announce a deal which allows the former to produce toys based upon the latter's comic book characters.
- January 10:
  - Cartoonist Jamie Hewlett, co-creator of the band Gorillaz, is nominated for the Designer of the Year award.
  - A fund to support journalists, writers, cartoonists and artists is launched. The fund is intended to help those who become persecuted for their work in the Middle East or North Africa. The fund was developed at the International Conference on Freedom of Expression in the Arab World, held in Amman, Jordan, in December 2005.
  - Comic book writer J. Torres is to write a series of graphic novels based on the popular television drama series Degrassi: The Next Generation.
  - German manga Yonen Buzz's first volume is released in English by Tokyopop.
- January 11:
  - Hal Foster fan Sid Weiskirch is to curate an exhibition of his work at the Noyes Cultural Center in Evanston, Illinois, where Foster was resident for 17 years.
  - Seth is interviewed by Daniel Robert Epstein for UnderGround Online.
  - AdHouse Books founder Chris Pitzer is interviewed at Newsarama. Pitzer discusses his opinion of the state of the industry at present and also the future.
- January 12:
  - Marvel Comics unveil a new costume for Spider-Man.
  - The Association of American Editorial Cartoonists place a report from the Business Journal of Phoenix, which comments on the future of editorial cartooning in the United States, upon their website.
  - The Springfield News-Sun offer up their top ten Stan Lee moments.
  - Tim Marchman reviews Chris Ware's Acme Novelty Library for the New York Press.
  - Spike TV is to show a two-hour drama based on the comic book and media franchise character Blade.
  - Simon & Schuster, Inc. announce that as of January 2006 they are to handle distribution within the United States for VIZ Media's book division.
- January 15: The Guardian review Hergé's Adventures of Tintin the musical at the Young Vic based on Tintin in Tibet.
- January 16: ICv2 reports on 2005 sales figures for works distributed to comics stores, noting that sales of graphic novels were up by a third.
  - Paul Gravett reviews the Young Vic's production of Hergé's Adventures of Tintin.
- January 17:
  - Drawn & Quarterly announce plans to collect Tove Jansson's Moomin comic strips. It is planned to collect the works in five volumes.
  - DC Comics announce that Dan Jurgens has signed an exclusive contract with them.
  - The Harvey Awards announce that they have added a "Best Online Comics Work" category to this year's awards.
- January 18:
  - ICv2 report that Strangers in Paradise by Terry Moore is to end with issue #90, scheduled for publication in March 2007.
- January 26: Lewis Trondheim is awarded the Grand Prix de la ville d'Angoulême at the Angoulême International Comics Festival
- January 26: Dylan Horrocks is named University of Auckland/Creative New Zealand Literary Fellow 2006.
- January 30:
  - The Children's Publishing division of Reader's Digest announce a licensing deal with Marvel Comics which will see them launch a line of interactive books based on popular Marvel characters.
- January 31:
  - Spike TV have greenlit a thirteen episode series based on the Blade comics and films.
  - Todd McFarlane Toys announce a deal with Warner Bros. allowing it to produce a line of action figures based on characters from the Hanna-Barbera library.

=== February ===
- February 1: A French newspaper, France-Soir, reprints the cartoons at the centre of the Jyllands-Posten Muhammad cartoons controversy.
- February 2:
  - Jyllands-Posten Muhammad cartoons controversy:
    - The editor of French newspaper France-Soir, which reprinted the cartoons at the centre of the controversy, is fired.
  - Many newspapers in continental Europe re-publish the cartoons.
  - The United States Joint Chiefs of Staff issue a letter of protest against a The Washington Post cartoon by Tom Toles.
  - Wizard announce the cancellation of WizardWorld Boston.
  - CNet News examine the digitization of comics.
  - Lewis Trondheim gives an interview in which he offers his frank opinions on journalists covering the medium.
- February 3:
  - Muslims take to the streets in many countries to protest the publication of the cartoons lampooning Mohammed.
  - The Indian Express reports nostalgically on the comic strips The Phantom and Jiggs.
  - Michael Fry announces his weekly panel Committed is to end on February 19.
- February 4:
  - Jyllands-Posten Muhammad cartoons controversy:
    - Syrian protestors set fire to Denmark's embassy in Damascus. They were demonstrating against the publication of cartoons defaming Mohammed in a Danish newspaper, Jyllands-Posten.
- February 6:
  - Jyllands-Posten Muhammad cartoons controversy:
    - It is reported that at least four people around the world are dead as a result of violent protests against the cartoons published in late 2005 by Danish newspaper Jyllands-Posten
    - The Daily Telegraph seeks to uncover the source of the "extra" three cartoons which were distributed in The Middle East as being actual cartoons published by Jyllands-Posten, when they were in actuality not.
  - Lagardère, a French publishing giant, is to purchase Time Warner Book Group from Time Warner. The division handles the distribution of graphic novels published by DC Comics to bookstores.
  - Salon review Ghost of Hoppers Jaime Hernandez's latest graphic novel.
  - James Cromwell is cast in the role of Captain George Stacy for the upcoming Spider-Man 3 movie.
  - Stan Lee is interviewed by science fiction weekly.
- February 7:
  - Jyllands-Posten Muhammad cartoons controversy:
    - Members of the State assembly in Kano, Nigeria, burn Danish flags in protest at the controversy.
    - Iranian newspaper Hamshahri announces "an international cartoon contest about the Holocaust".
  - Paul Levitz, publisher and president of DC Comics is to write six issues of the JSA comic book.
  - Law.com profile John N. Turitzin, executive vice president of and general counsel to Marvel Comics.
- February 8:
  - Jyllands-Posten Muhammad cartoons controversy:
    - President Bush issues a statement calling for calm: "I call upon the governments around the world to stop the violence, to be respectful, to protect property, to protect the lives of innocent diplomats who are serving their countries overseas."
    - The Danish embassy in Tehran is stormed.
    - The editorial staff of the New York Press walk out after the publishers of the paper refuse to carry the cartoons at the centre of the controversy.
    - The editor of the Jyllands-Posten, Carsten Juste, rejects suggestions he should resign.
    - Pakistan's Daily Times reveals Danish law should have prevented the publication of the cartoons.
    - The Association of American Editorial Cartoonists issues a statement which expresses support for "the right of free expression by the world's cartoonists."
- February 9:
  - Jyllands-Posten Muhammad cartoons controversy:
    - The United States' Talk of the Nation examine the power the editorial cartoon has.
    - 2000 Muslims protest in Bangladesh and thousands of Shi'ite Muslims in Lebanon turn a religious ceremony into a pacific protest over the cartoons.
    - Condoleezza Rice blames Iran and Syria for stoking the controversy regarding the cartoons.
    - The BBC summarise the situation so far.
  - The San Francisco Bay Area minicomic scene is examined up by the local press.
  - Hill & Wang a non-fiction imprint of Farrar, Straus and Giroux are to launch a line of non-fiction graphic novels under the name Novel Graphics. The first work will be an adaptation of the 9/11 Commission Report.
  - DC Comics are to unveil their line of toys based on the movie Superman Returns at the 2006 American International Toy Fair.
- February 10:
  - Jyllands-Posten Muhammad cartoons controversy:
    - Flemming Rose, editor of the Jyllands-Posten is told to take a vacation after he commented the paper "would run the cartoons" published by Hamshahri in its contest inviting cartoons satirising the holocaust.
    - Denmark's Prime Minister Anders Fogh Rasmussen agrees with comments made by Condoleezza Rice regarding Syria and Iran, noting they "have taken advantage of the situation because both countries are under international pressure".
    - It is reported at least thirteen people are dead due to protests against the cartoons.
- February 11:
  - Illinois newspaper The Daily Herald has launched an online cartoon page composed entirely of webcomics.
  - Peter David announces he has signed an exclusive contract with Marvel Comics.
- February 12:
  - Frank Miller has announced that his next Batman book, Holy Terror, Batman!, will pit the caped crusader against Osama bin Laden.
  - At Wondercon, Grant Morrison is announced as the next writer on Batman.
- February 13:
  - Jyllands-Posten Muhammad cartoons controversy:
    - Denmark's Prime Minister Anders Fogh Rasmussen responds to criticism of his country, declaring "Denmark is an open and tolerant society".
    - Anders Fogh Rasmussen has also had talks with a Muslim group called "Democratic Muslims".
    - It is reported that Muslim graves have been desecrated in Denmark.
    - Denmark withdraws official staff from embassies in Syria, Iran, and Indonesia.
    - Art Spiegelman is interviewed to garner his thoughts on the controversy.
    - Iran demands apologies after recent accusations from Condoleezza Rice that it had fermented the controversy.
  - Ted Rall is reportedly considering launching a lawsuit against Ann Coulter over comments she jokingly alleged that "Iran is soliciting cartoons on the Holocaust. So far, only Ted Rall, Garry Trudeau, and The New York Times have made submissions".
- February 14: zoomaphoto.com
  - Jyllands-Posten Muhammad cartoons controversy:
    - Two security guards are shot dead and police use tear gas on rioting students as protests continue in Pakistan.
    - Belgian Muslim groups have called on the European Union to "act determinedly to prepare a draft law that forbids every kind of blasphemy".
    - A number of Danish websites have reportedly been hacked by protestors.
- February 15:
  - Jyllands-Posten Muhammad cartoons controversy:
    - Danish politicians have called for an investigation into a Muslim group's actions during a trip to the Middle East. It is alleged the group may have helped ferment the recent protests.
    - Flemming Rose, cultural editor of the Jyllands-Posten has stated that the cartoons were published to "go against this tendency to self-censorship".
    - Carsten Juste, editor of the Jyllands-Posten, states his belief that "Muslims are being given special treatment".
  - Justin Thomas is announced as the winner of a contest to choose the next cartoonist of the strip Unfit.
- February 16:
  - Jyllands-Posten Muhammad cartoons controversy:
    - Twelve people are reported to have died in Afghanistan after a week of protesting.
    - Three people are reported to have died as protests continue in Pakistan.
  - The Prime Minister of Turkey, Recep Tayyip Erdoğan, has lost his claim for compensation. Erdoğan was suing over a number of cartoons which had depicted him as a series of animals.
- February 17:
  - Jyllands-Posten Muhammad cartoons controversy:
    - Eleven people are reportedly killed after protesting in Libya.
    - Indiana newspaper The Indianapolis Star polls college newspaper editors within the state on their opinion on publishing the cartoons.
  - Ivan Brunetti is interviewed by Nashville City Paper.
- February 19:
  - Jyllands-Posten Muhammad cartoons controversy:
    - 45 people reportedly die after rioting in Nigeria in protest against the cartoons.
    - Security forces in Pakistan disperse a protest against the cartoons.
    - The United States embassy in Jakarta is attacked by protestors.
    - A small group of protesters gather outside the Danish embassy in Tehran.
  - Paul Pope discusses Batman: Year 100 with the Toronto Star.
- February 20:
  - Jyllands-Posten Muhammad cartoons controversy:
    - 'The New York Times previews Marvels new crossover event, Civil War.
    - Denmark's Prime Minister Anders Fogh Rasmussen defends the handling of the controversy.
    - The Danish flag is burnt by protestors in Jakarta.
    - The Nation ask Art Spiegelman and Joe Sacco for their thoughts on the current controversy.
    - Russian newspaper Our region+ closes after publishing the cartoons.
  - JM Thevenet is reportedly fired as the director of the Festival International de la Bande Dessinee.
  - Nominees for the 2006 Shuster Awards are announced.
  - icv2.com report on January's Direct Market sales figures.
  - The Guardian reports on the new cartoon museum in London.
- February 21:
  - Jyllands-Posten Muhammad cartoons controversy:
    - A number of Muslims protest against the cartoons in India.
    - Christopher Hitchens, writing for Slate, examines the issue.
    - The Danish Ambassador returns to Jakarta having left in the wake of protests over the cartoons.
    - A second Russian newspaper, the weekly Nash Region closes after having printed a montage of the cartoons.
  - JM Thevenet confirms he has been fired from his position with Festival International de la Bande Dessinee, although he claims he was employed as a consultant.
  - The Guardian sketches the history of the political cartoon as a prelude to the opening of The Cartoon Museum in London.
- February 22:
  - Jyllands-Posten Muhammad cartoons controversy:
    - Corpses are burnt on the streets of Onitsha, Nigeria, as part of an ongoing confrontation between Christians and Muslims regarding the cartoons.
    - Protestors stage a demonstration outside the Danish embassy in Jakarta.
    - The Danish Prime Minister, Anders Fogh Rasmussen, notes the controversy has become something greater than the initial furor over editorial cartoons, noting "It's about everything else and different agendas in the Muslim world."
    - Danish volunteers and non-government officials are withdrawing from the relief effort aiding those areas of Pakistan hit by the recent earthquake and leaving the country as a result of the Pakistani people's protest against the cartoons.
  - Naushad Waheed, a political cartoonist and artist sentenced to 15 years imprisonment in the Maldives for political unrest, has been freed.
  - iBooks, the publishing company founded by Byron Preiss, files for bankruptcy. Preiss died in June 2005.
- February 23:
  - Jyllands-Posten Muhammad cartoons controversy
    - Silvio Berlusconi, Italian Prime Minister, denounces the cartoons at the heart of the controversy.
    - Amitai Sandy and Eyal Zusman, organisers of an antisemitic cartoon contest, are profiled by World Press.
  - Marvel Comics announces a drop in profits.
  - The London cartoon museum is opened by Prince Philip, Duke of Edinburgh.
- February 24:
  - Jyllands-Posten Muhammad cartoons controversy:
    - Doug Marlette comments on the controversy.
    - Protestors demonstrate in Pakistan, defying a ban which prohibits such gatherings.
  - Kyle Baker is to be the host for the 2006 Harvey Awards.
  - Warner Bros. are reported to have confirmed sequels to Batman Begins and Superman Returns.
  - The London cartoon museum opens to the public.
- February 26: The New York Comic Con has problems with the size of the crowd attending the convention, having to turn visitors away.
- The Philadelphia Inquirer reports on the recent phenomenon of non-comics writers being approached to write for the medium by the larger comics publishers.
- February 27:
  - Jyllands-Posten Muhammad cartoons controversy:
    - European Union officials issue a fresh statement on the controversy.
    - It is reported that Denmark are to hold a conference examining the controversy and the publication of the cartoons on March 10.
    - Finnish magazine Kaltio has fired its editor after he published a cartoon commentating on the controversy by Ville Ranta on the magazine's website. The sacking came in the wake of pressure from advertisers. Ranta has also lost work on the strength of the cartoon.
  - Speakeasy Comics announces it is to cease publishing.
- February 28:
  - Jeff Danziger is announced as the winner of the Herblock Prize for editorial cartooning, to be awarded on April 18.
  - Aaron McGruder is to take a six-month break from Boondocks.
  - It is reported that at the recent New York Comic Con Dark Horse Comics announced that they are to double their output of manga titles this year.
  - Marvel Comics and Top Cow announce a tie-up which will see artists employed by Top Cow illustrating up to 36 Marvel titles this year.
  - DC Comics are to publish Megatokyo through their imprint CMX. The title had previously been published by Dark Horse Comics.
  - The Oregon Daily Emerald reports on Art Spiegelman's speaking tour date at the University of Oregon.
  - Jyllands-Posten Muhammad cartoons controversy:
    - Nigerian governors condemn the recent riots that have taken place in the country.

=== March ===
- March 1:
  - Renae Geerlings becomes editor in chief of Top Cow Productions
  - Jyllands-Posten Muhammad cartoons controversy:
    - Salman Rushdie is amongst the twelve writers who are signatories to a statement denouncing Islamism as "a new global totalitarian threat"
- March 2:
  - R. Kikuo Johnson's Night Fisher graphic novel has been named on the New York Public Library's Books for the Teen Age list for 2006
  - Art Spiegelman and Françoise Mouly have contracted with Puffin Books to produce two projects. The first, Big Fat Little Lit, is a collection of stories from the couple's three volume Little Lit series, whilst the second, Toon Into Reading, is described by Mouly as "a revolutionary new concept to draw kids into the pleasures of reading."
  - Penny Arcade Vol. 1: Attack of the Bacon Robots is to receive a second printing
- March 3:
  - Neil Gaiman writes a piece for The Guardian detailing his thoughts on the adapting of comics stories to film
  - Stacy Curtis, editorial cartoonist for The Times of Northwest Indiana is let go. There are now reportedly approximately 80 full-time editorial cartoonists employed in the United States
  - The National Press Club of Canada launch their 6th International Editorial Cartoon Competition, with a theme of "Cartooning in a dangerous environment".
  - Virgin Comics announces its initial line of comics, with three books, Devi, Ramayan Reborn, and The Sadhu published under the company's Shakti imprint, and a fourth, as yet unnamed project to be printed under the Director's Cut imprint
  - Jyllands-Posten Muhammad cartoons controversy:
    - Pakistan blocks access to blogs and websites which encourage people to cartoon the prophet Mohammed
- March 5:
  - Jyllands-Posten Muhammad cartoons controversy:
    - Over 50 000 people reportedly protest against the cartoons in Pakistan, whilst around 20 000 are reported to have demonstrated in Turkey
- March 6:
  - The BBC profile E. H. Shepherd, whose work for Punch will feature in an exhibition at the Political Cartoon Gallery.
  - Dan Piraro, cartoonist on the Bizarro panel, is to be awarded The Humane Society of the United States' Ongoing Commitment Award on March 18.
- March 7:
  - Comic strip collection publishing company Andrews McMeel Publishing announce a tie up with Simon & Schuster UK which will allow the company access to the markets of the United Kingdom and Ireland.
  - ICv2.com report on First Second Books' fall list. Included on the publication list is Kampung Boy, a memoir by Lat.
- March 8:
  - Neil Gaiman and Roger Avary are developing a movie script based on Charles Burns' graphic novel Black Hole.
  - Pantheon Books is to publish a new work by Marjane Satrapi, Chicken With Plums, in October, along with The Long Chalkboard by Jules Feiffer and wife Jenny Allen.
  - SouthFlorida.com profile Jeannie Schulz, widow of Peanuts creator Charles.
  - Adrian Tomine is interviewed by Comic Book Resources.
- March 9:
  - Newsarama interview James McTeigue, director of the adaptation of V for Vendetta.
  - The Center for Cartoon Studies is auctioning a breakfast with three cartoonists as a means of raising funds. The cartoonists in question are Chris Ware, Seth and Ivan Brunetti.
  - Jodi Picoult is to incorporate the comics form into her new novel, The Tenth Circle.
  - Oor Wullie and its creators were allegedly placed on a Nazi hit list during World War II due to the strips lampooning of Hitler.
  - In a Canadian student magazine an episode of the comic strip Capitalist Piglet is published, by Marq and Yiph, which features a gag where Jesus Christ gives fellatio to a capitalist pig. In the course of months the offensive cartoon will become a national scandal.
- March 10:
  - CBGExtra are reporting that comic book distributor FM International has ceased trading.
  - Michael Ramirez editorial cartoonist of the Los Angeles Times, wins The Scripps Howard Foundation National Journalism Award in editorial cartooning.
- March 11:
  - Mike Luckovich of The Atlanta Journal-Constitution wins the National Headliners Award for editorial cartooning.
  - John Sherffius receives the 2006 Wilbur Award for editorial cartooning on religious issues and themes.
  - Bill Whitehead of the Kansas City Business Journal, receives first place from the Kansas Press Association for best editorial cartoons of 2005 in weekly publications.
  - HamptonRoads.com and Associated Press discuss cancer-inspired graphic novels, including Brian Fies' Mom's Cancer, Harvey Pekar's Our Cancer Year and Miriam Engelberg's Cancer Made Me a Shallower Person, due out in May from HarperCollins.
  - Scarcecomics.co.uk, an online auction site for rare British comics, is discussed in Liverpool's Daily Post.
  - Alan Moore is discussed in The Telegraph.
- March 12:
  - The New York Times report on Alan Moore's career and his attitude to the recent Hollywood adaptations of his works and to DC Comics.
- March 13:
  - Superman Returns director Bryan Singer and screenwriters Michael Dougherty and Dan Harris are to collaborate on a series of comic books which will bridge the gap between the Superman II movie and the new sequel.
- March 14:
  - E-Man, the character created by Nicola Cuti and Joe Staton, is to return in a series from Digital Webbing Press.
  - Ed Stein wins the 2006 John Fischetti Award for editorial cartooning.
- March 15:
  - Booklist's new issue includes several features related to comics:
    - A Top 10 Graphic Novels for Youth compiled for the magazine.
    - A Top 10 Graphic Novels: 2006 compiled by Ray Olsen.
    - Kate Kan writes an article titled Great Graphic Novels for Younger Readers.
    - An interview with Mark Siegel, editorial director of First Second the new graphic novel imprint launched by Roaring Brook.
    - An article from Jeff Smith regarding his career as a graphic novelist.
    - Michael Cart contributes an article discussing his love of comics.
    - Archaia Studios Press officially releases color hardcover edition of The Lone and Level Sands.
- March 16:
  - The Alex strip in The Telegraph will be coloured and feature an advertisement for Xerox for six weeks.
  - The Boston Herald report on the graphic novel phenomenon.
  - Teshkeel Comics publish their first comic in the Middle East under a licensing deal with Marvel Comics. Translated into Arabic, Spectacular Spider-Man is the first magazine to feature the character in the region.
  - The BBC's Collective magazine interview participants in Fantagraphics quarterly MOME anthology.
  - Iranian cartoonist Kianoosh Ramezani discusses the problems which face both cartoonists and their publishing editors in the Ledger-Enquirer.
- March 17:
  - Marvel announce plans to publish a graphic novel formatted anthology based on the computer game series Halo, featuring work by Simon Bisley and Moebius amongst others.
  - J. Scott Campbell signs an exclusive contract with Marvel Comics.
  - Dallas names May 6 as Comic Book Appreciation Day. May 6 is also Free Comic Book Day.
  - Nominations for the 2005 National Newspaper Awards are announced. The awards include an Editorial Cartooning category in which Serge Chapleau of La Presse, Montreal; Brian Gable of The Globe and Mail, and Bruce MacKinnon of the Halifax Chronicle-Herald are nominated.
  - Dr. Jon Suter donates his collection of over 2000 strips to the Oklahoma Cartoonists Collection.
  - Teshkeel Media Group sign a deal to translate and distribute Archie Comics in the Middle East.
- March 18:
  - Tom Spurgeon announces his top fifty comics of 2005.
- March 19:
  - OK/Cancel discuss making money from webcomics.
  - The Philadelphia Inquirer reports on comics' literary status.
  - Contra Costa Times reports on comics' literary status.
  - The Age report on the success of manga in Australia.
- March 20:
  - Marvel Comics are to release Jack Kirby's Galactic Bounty Hunters, a series based on characters Jack Kirby created, with Kirby's daughter Lisa and former collaborator Mike Thibodeaux helping to expand on the concepts.
  - Art Spiegelman has joined the jury to judge an antisemitic cartoon contest sponsored by Israeli comics collective Dimona Comics.
  - ICv2 report that sales of comics to comic book stores were up in February.
  - Casting Producer Austen James discusses the Sci-Fi Channel's new programme "Who Wants To Be a Superhero?", due to be aired in the United States this spring, with Comic Book Resources.
  - Gerald Scarfe wins a British Press Award for Cartoonist of the Year.
  - F Minus, a strip which appears on Comics.com, is to be syndicated by United Media from April 17.
- March 21:
  - Tom Spurgeon reports that Dark Horse Comics are to release Off the Beaten Path, a collection of photographs of cartoonists in their studios by Greg Preston.
  - The New York Review of Books review The R. Crumb Handbook.
  - The Village Voice review Jessica Abel's La Perdida.
- March 22:
  - Jyllands-Posten Muhammad cartoons controversy:
    - Laila Freivalds, Swedish Foreign Minister, resigns after being accused of lying to the media regarding the shutting down of sites which may have had plans to carry the cartoons.
- March 26:
  - Superman/Batman #26 is announced as a tribute book to Sam Loeb, son of Jeph Loeb, who died in 2005. Sam Loeb was due to write the book himself, and 26 collaborators have been assembled to complete the work.
  - The Los Angeles Times editorialises on the trademarked nature of the term Super Heroes.
  - The North Bergen Reporter profile Otto Messmer, creator of Felix the Cat.
- March 27:
  - 113 creators pledge their support for the editors at Dupuis as they attempt to gain greater independence for the imprint from owners Media-Participations.
- March 28:
  - Editor & Publisher report that Garry Trudeau is to receive a lifetime achievement award from Georgetown University's Institute for the Study of Diplomacy on April 4.
  - HarperCollins and TokyPop announce a publishing and distribution deal which will see manga works by HarperCollins authors co-published by the two companies.
  - Ralph Steadman is to receive the Milton Caniff Award for Lifetime Achievement.
  - The nominees for the 2006 Reuben Awards, to be awarded on May 27, are announced.
- March 29:
  - Panini Comics extends its licensing deal with Marvel Comics into more territories and also announces an X-Men graphic novel aimed at the European market with script by Chris Claremont and art by Milo Manara.
  - The Manila Times run an editorial supporting editorial cartoons.
  - An exhibition at the California Science Center explores the powers and abilities of Marvel superheroes and the real world science that may ultimately replicate them.
- March 30:
  - ICv2.com report that V for Vendetta is number one in Nielsen BookScan's list, ranked by sales, of graphic novels sold through book stores.
- March 31:
  - The five people accused of murdering Indian cartoonist Irfan Hussain are acquitted by Judge Talwant Singh.
  - AllAfrica.com report that Godfrey Mwampembwa, a cartoonist for the Nairobi paper The Daily Nation, has been threatened with legal action by Martha Karua, a politician whom the cartoonist has satirised.
  - The Johns Hopkins News-Letter reviews Chris Ware's Acme Novelty Library issue 16.

=== April ===
- April 1:
  - The London Free Press report on representations of the Iraq War in superhero comics.
- April 3:
  - The Chicago Defender revamps its comics page, renaming it "All Black Cartoons". The page will only feature strips by African-American cartoonists.
  - Tower Records launches an online bookstore which will also retail graphic novels.
  - The case against Gordon Lee, a comic book retailer who has been charged with distributing harmful material to minors, is dropped, with prosecutors filing fresh charges after discovering the material was distributed to two minors, instead of the one originally named in the suit.
  - Turkish Prime Minister Recep Tayyip Erdoğan is to appeal against the dismissal of his suit against Penguen, a magazine which had published a cartoon satirising him.
  - The Gulf Times reports on Australian – Indonesian relations on asylum as cartoonists satirise the issue.
  - Vancouver's 24 hours.com report on the graphic novel phenomenon.
  - The Prix Bedelys are awarded in Quebec, with Pierre Fournier and Real Godbout's Michel Risque winning the Jury Prix.
- April 4:
  - Variety report that on March 23 Judge Ronald S.W. Lew found that the copyright to Superboy had reverted to Joanne Siegel and Laura Siegel Larson, widow and daughter of Jerry Siegel. The ruling also cast doubt on the lack of infringement on the Superboy copyright by the Smallville television series, with Lew noting: "Enough facts are presented, where this court, contrary to defendants' request, could find that the main character in 'Smallville' is in fact Superboy."
  - Diamond announce the winners of the 16th annual Diamond Gem Awards. DC Comics' Justice wins comic book of the year.
  - The Columbus Dispatch report on the complications involved in editing comic strips.
  - Gilbert Hernandez and Richard Sala are to contribute series to Coconino Press's Ignatz line, co-published in English by Fantagraphics.
  - Penguin Books has commissioned new covers for books in its Penguin Classics line from some of the leading artists in comics, including Art Spiegelman, Chris Ware and Charles Burns.
  - Jyllands-Posten Muhammad cartoons controversy:
    - Malaysian Information Minister Datuk Zainuddin Maidin urges cartoonists to avoid "caricatures that could hurt other races or religions or incite hatred".
    - Carla Seaquist discusses the free speech issues of cartooning in the wake of the controversy.
- April 5:
  - Nominees for the 2006 Eisner Awards are announced, with Floyd Gottfredson and William Moulton Marston being the judge's choices for entry into the hall of fame.
  - Anime News Network contact manga publishers to discuss how the bankruptcy of distributor Biblos will affect them.
  - Seattle Weekly interview David Lasky.
- April 6:
  - RelishNow report on the stress which cartoonists may face, and may lead to burn out.
  - Peter David is to script the opening seven issues of the Dark Tower comic book series, based upon Stephen King's novel series of the same name. Jae Lee is providing the art.
  - Marvel Comics issue a press release stating that Chris Claremont is suffering from cardiac stress and that this will result in delays to two books, Exiles and GeNext, which Claremont was due to take over in May.
- April 7:
  - Cartoonist Jonathon Shapiro (Zapiro) wins the Mondi South African Journalist of the Year Award.
- April 8:
  - The New York Times profile comic book writer Roberto Aguirre-Sacasa.
- April 9:
  - The Malaysian Star interview Lat, Philippe Dupuy and King Ban Hui at the Concert of Drawings series of events held by the National Art Gallery during the 11th French-Language Week. The artists were at the event to take part in a live drawing exhibition.
- April 11:
  - Editorial cartoonist and United States National Guard platoon sergeant Vaughn Larson' discusses his recent call-up to Iraq.
- April 12:
  - Adventure Gamers review the computer game based upon the Bone comic book series by Jeff Smith.
  - Seattle Weekly review Fantagraphics' recent reissue of Milt Gross' He Done Her Wrong.
- April 13:
  - Entertainment Weekly review Gary Spencer Millidge's Strangehaven.
  - Stan Sakai details his time as a guest at Spain's XI Salon del Comic de Granada for the Honolulu Star.
- April 14:
  - Mike Luckovich is announced the winner of the Sigma Delta Chi Award for 2005. The award is presented by the Society of Professional Journalists.
  - Tom Spurgeon reports that Paul Gravett's Manga: Sixty Years of Japanese Comics has been removed from shelves in libraries across San Bernardino county.
  - Bart Beatty compares and contrasts the United States SPX and the Swiss Fumetto conventions in his Eurocomics column for The Comics Reporter.
- April 17:
  - The Comics Reporter reports that Mike Luckovich is the winner of the 2006 Pulitzer Prize in editorial cartooning.
  - ICv2.com report on comic book and graphic novel sales figures for March.
  - Student editorial cartoonist William C Warren wins the AAEC/John Locher Award.
- April 18:
  - Chris Ware announces he is moving his Acme Novelty Library series to publisher Drawn & Quarterly. The series had previously been published by Fantagraphics, although Ware published issue 16 himself, with Fantagraphics distributing the issue.
  - Swiss Info profile cartoonist Mike van Audenhove.
  - The Wall Street Journal discusses product placement as it occurs within comics.
- April 20:
  - John Backderf's The City wins in the Cartoon category of the 38th Annual Robert F. Kennedy Journalism Awards.
- April 21:
  - Antisemitic cartoon contest organised by Amitai Sandy.
  - The Pittsburgh Tribune-Review preview the forthcoming Pittsburgh Comicon.
  - Nashville's The City Paper profile cartoonist Dean Trippe.
  - Angel Boligan, editorial cartoonist for Mexico City's El Universal newspaper, wins the World Press Cartooning Prize.
  - Virgin Comics announce their opening line up of books.
- April 23:
  - The Morning Sentinel celebrate Doonesbury reaching 35 years of publication.
  - Scott Collura interviews Terry Zwigoff about his Crumb documentary for Now Playing.
  - Time profile Neil Gaiman.
  - The Bradenton Herald profile the forthcoming Free Comic Book Day, scheduled this year for May 6.
- April 24:
  - Mike Luckovich of The Atlanta Journal-Constitution and The Christian Science Monitor's Clay Bennett win the Overseas Press Club's award for editorial cartooning.
  - Newsarama summarise the events and news from the recent Pittsburgh Comicon.
- April 25:
  - Paul Combs announces he is leaving The Tampa Tribune. The paper is seeking a replacement for the editorial cartoonist, who is leaving "for family reasons".
  - Bill Poostmus, the man who ordered the removal of a work on manga from the shelves of libraries in California, is declared to be censoring a "critically acclaimed book" by the National Coalition Against Censorship, who are monitoring the situation and have not ruled out legal action.
  - The Age profile Will Dyson, an Australian war artist who covered the First World War.
  - Sarah Boxer reviews the Masters of American Comics exhibition for Artforum.
- April 26:
  - British distributor Red Route is reported to have ceased trading.
  - Wired comment on the slowness of the two major American comics publishers to embrace the digital market.
  - Bob Wayne talks to Newsarama about the "One Year Later" books DC will be publishing in the wake of "Infinite Crisis".
  - Shazna Nessa discusses the accessibility of comics and graphic novels to a female audience in The Charleston Gazette.
- April 27:
  - New England's The Phoenix report on DC Comics' "One Year Later" revamp.
  - Ed Brubaker signs an extension to his exclusive contract with Marvel Comics.
  - Anders Nilsen writes an essay on art for the BBC.
  - Pakistan begin legal proceedings against the editor and publisher of the Jyllands-Posten for publication of the cartoons depicting caricatures of Mohammed.
  - Alex Chun comments on the changes recent technological advances have made on society and how they may impact on the newspaper comic strip.
- April 28:
  - Image Comics are to publish the second volume of Afterworks, an anthology featuring work by noted animators, including Max Brace and Nathan Stanton.
- April 29:
  - The winners of the second annual Shuster Awards are announced.
- April 30:
  - Tom Spurgeon interviews Grady Klein.
  - Turkey's Supreme Court of Appeals overturns an earlier judgement which fined cartoonist Musa Kart over his depiction of the Prime Minister Recep Tayyip Erdoğan as a cat.
- Specific date in April unknown: Gary Panter releases the graphic novel Jimbo's Inferno.

=== May ===
- May 1:
  - The Seattle Post-Intelligencer profile Dan Piraro.
  - The Detroit News and Larry Wright agree terms which will see the paper buy out the cartoonist's contract.
- May 2:
  - The nominations for Holland's 2006 Clickburg awards are announced. The awards are to recognise webcomics, and this year organisers have added a Best International Clickie category.
  - Mark Parisi is profiled by The Christian Science Monitor.
  - Tom Spurgeon rounds up commentary and reportage on yesterday's report by The Comics Journal on the incident involving Charles Brownstein.
  - National Public Radio's Talk of the Nation features Paul Jenkins and Joe Quesada as part of its coverage of Marvel Comics' Civil War storyline.
- May 3:
  - Menu Larcenet, Lax and Marjane Satrapi are the nominees for the VPRO Grand Prix, to be announced on June 2 at Stripdagen Harlem 2006.
  - Steve Dunn reports on Alan Moore's new graphic novel, Lost Girls, for The Oregonian.
  - The New York Press interview Terry Zwigoff and discuss his forthcoming film, Art School Confidential, based upon the graphic novel by Dan Clowes.
  - The San Francisco Bay Guardian profile Dan Clowes.
  - ICv2.com discuss the size of the manga market in North America in 2005.
  - The Jyllands-Posten is suing Michael Christiani Havemann over his comments which allege that the paper's management asked the staff cartoonist to create controversial cartoons since those sent in by freelancers "were not gross enough."
  - Variety report that the Silver Surfer may appear in the sequel to the Fantastic Four movie.
  - Newsarama report that DC Comics are set to launch new titles, including Raven, Teen Titans East, and relaunches of Justice Society of America, Mystery in Space and Tales of the Unexpected.
  - Tim Kreider writes on The New Yorker cartoon buying process, and his rejection by it.
- May 4:
  - CNN reports on the readership of newspaper comic strips in the U.S.
  - Marvel Comics release first quarter figures, which are better than the company and investors had expected.
- May 5:
  - Ron Garney reportedly signs an exclusive contract at Marvel Comics.
  - Brian Doherty discusses DC's recent Infinite Crisis series in the context of George Bush's foreign policy.
  - Both the National Conference of the Canadian Association of Journalists and a convention of the Association of American Editorial Cartoonists will discuss the Jyllands-Posten Muhammad cartoons controversy.
- May 6:
  - Marvel Comics donates a number of comic books to a local hospital as part of Free Comic Book Day
  - It is reported that a series of editorial cartoons may have led to a newspaper's offices in Sri Lanka being attacked.
- May 7:
  - Carla Seaquist discusses the free speech issues surrounding the Jyllands-Posten Muhammad cartoons controversy for the Seattle Times.
  - Chris Ware is profiled by Artdaily.
- May 8:
  - Chris Ware is interviewed on a local news station.
  - Tom Spurgeon rounds up the online reports of the American Free Comic Book Day, held May 6.
- May 9:
  - Jill Thompson signs a four-book deal with HarperCollins, which will see the artist produce a series of graphic novels starring a young witch, to be aimed at young children.
  - The Chicago Sun-Times discusses Chris Ware and his work.
  - TokyoPop announce two new lines of manga books aimed at a younger audience, the Manga Chapters line for 6-9 year olds and the Manga Readers for an 8-12 audience.
  - Tom Spurgeon reports on the recipients of the Xeric Grants.
- May 10:
  - ICv2.com report that Marvel's Moon Knight series is to be ongoing, and not a six issue limited series as originally announced.
- May 11:
  - Dutch comics store owner Kees Kousemaker, whose store Lambiek is the oldest comics store in Europe, is knighted as a Knight in the Order of Orange-Nassau. This marks the first time a comics store owner is knighted.
  - Five pieces of artwork by Osamu Tezuka are discovered in the United States. The works were held in a collection at the University of Maryland, and were pieces published in the two years following his debut, 1947 and 1948.
  - Islam Online host a debate between cartoonist Signe Wilkinson and journalist Felicity Arbuthnot regarding the issues of free speech which surround the Jyllands-Posten Muhammad cartoons controversy.
  - The Star-Gazette report on DC's new weekly series, 52.
  - Del Rey announces that they will publish a graphic novel based on Terry Brooks' Shannara series. Edwin David will provide art, while Robert Place Napton will adapt Brooks' story.
- May 13: Suske en Wiske receive a comics mural in Antwerp, Belgium.
- May 15:
  - Art Spiegelman contributes the cover and an article on the Jyllands-Posten Muhammad cartoons controversy for the latest issue of Harper's magazine.
  - Tom Spurgeon reports the winners of the Eagle Awards, announced last night. Grant Morrison is added to the roll of honour and John M. Burns is recognised with an award for Outstanding Achievements in British Comics.
  - Michael Gaydos is announced as the illustrator of Virgin Comics' Snake Woman.
- May 16:
  - Reuters' report on Art Spiegelman's comments on the Jyllands-Posten Muhammad cartoons controversy in the latest edition of Harper's magazine.
  - First Second announce they have reached an agreement to produce a series of graphic novels based upon the Prince of Persia computer game. The company have also signed two books from the award-winning Italian cartoonist Gipi, Tiny Tyrant, a children's book from Lewis Trondheim and Will Davis' adaptation of Joseph Bruchac's novel Dawn Land.
  - Fantagraphics confirm they are to collect E.C. Segar's daily and Sunday Popeye strips in a series of six hardcover volumes.
  - The Pulse report that Mark Wheatley is to address the United States Library of Congress today. His presentation is to be on comic books, and is part of the libraries ongoing lecture series.
  - ICv2.com report that a new trial date has been set in the case of Georgia v. Gordon Lee. The CBLDF are defending Lee, a comic book retailer facing trial on two misdemeanors after allegedly giving a free comic book containing nudity to two under-age brothers. The trial is now due to be heard on May 19.
- May 17:
  - The Virginia Quarterly Review place Jeet Heer's essay "Little Nemo in Comicsland", which discusses the work of Winsor McCay, online in their latest issue.
  - BookForum reports on The Comics Journal's 30th anniversary.
  - The Sydney Morning Herald profile Neil Gaiman.
- May 18:
  - The Unrepresented Nations and Peoples Organization announce that the Dalai Lama is to award the Herge Foundation with the International Campaign for Tibet's Light of Truth. Tsering Jampa, executive director of ICT Europe, noted that "For many, Hergé's depiction of Tibet was their introduction to the awe-inspiring landscape and culture of Tibet, while Archbishop Tutu's struggle against apartheid and injustice in the face of adversity is an inspiration to Tibetans around the world."
  - The Association des Critiques et des journalistes de Bande Dessinée announce the twenty nominations for the Prix de la critique.
  - The Pittsburgh Tribune-Review review the work of Chas Fagan, an editorial cartoonist turned historical painter.
- May 19:
  - ICv2.com notes that the market for graphic novels has continued to grow in the first quarter of 2006, and declares V for Vendetta the top selling graphic novel of the period.
- May 20:
  - Newsarama discuss the life of Michael Siegel, son of Superman co-creator Jerry Siegel.
- May 21:
  - The New York Times Sunday Arts & Leisure section runs article "Phoenix's Unresolved Daddy Thing, and Other X-Men Issues", tied to X-Men: The Last Stand.
- May 22:
  - Jamie Hewlett is named the Designer of the Year by the Design Museum for his work on the band Gorillaz.
  - The Independent profile cartoonist Gerald Scarfe.
  - Lee Salem is announced as the next president of the Universal Press Syndicate, to take over from Bob Duffy who retires in July.
- May 23:
  - The Committee to Protect Journalists report that Iran have closed a newspaper and arrested the editor and cartoonist over the paper's publication of a cartoon depicting a cockroach speaking Azeri. It is also alleged the cartoon featured ethnic slurs. Four people are alleged to have died during rioting in protest of the cartoon's publication.
  - ICv2.com report on comic book and graphic novel sales figures for the month of April, noting that strong sales for DC's Infinite Crisis mini-series helped counterbalance a fall in sales in the graphic novel market.
- May 24:
  - Neil Gaiman and Adam Rogers discuss the appeal of Superman for Wired.
  - New York Newsday runs an entertainment-pullout cover feature comparing the X-Men and Superman movie franchises.
- May 25:
  - BlackAmericaWeb.com examine the wider acceptance and profiles of black superheroes.
- May 26:
  - Philly.com discuss the comic book influences behind the latest X-Men movie.
  - It is reported that the 2006 recipients of the Bill Finger Award for Excellence in Comic Book Writing will go to Harvey Kurtzman and Alvin Schwart. The awards will be made as part of the Eisner Awards on July 21.
  - The Nation profile caricaturist Edward Sorel.
- May 27:
  - Mike Luckovich wins the 2006 Reuben Award.
  - Canada's The Globe and Mail report on the news that Indigo Books and Music has refused to carry the latest issue of Harper's magazine due to its printing of the cartoons at the centre of the Jyllands-Posten Muhammad cartoons controversy.
- May 28:
  - The New York Times report that the new Batwoman character is to be a lesbian.
- May 29:
  - The Los Angeles Times discuss the impact of digital piracy on small press publishers in the comic book market.
- May 30:
  - Alex Ross is to provide covers for Virgin Comics.
  - The Caymanian Compass report that two editors of weekly newspapers in Jordan have been jailed for reprinting the cartoons at the centre of the Jyllands-Posten Muhammad cartoons controversy.
  - The Prix Albert Uderzo for 2006 awards are announced, with works by Baru; Steve Cuzor and Frank Giroud; and François Boucq winning.
  - AsianNews discuss the recent closure of a newspaper in Iran and the wider controls which place limits on the freedom of the press.
  - Newcity announce their Lit 50, a list of "those whose creative influence is the greatest", and include Chris Ware, Alex Ross, Jeffrey Brown and Paul Hornschemeier.
  - ICv2.com carry a statement from Central Park Media in which they announce a number of job losses. The statement is released in response to rumors which have circulated on the internet that the company will be declaring bankruptcy.
  - French-Belgian comics artist Tibet is promoted to Officier de l'Ordre des Arts et des Lettres.
- May 31:
  - Alison Bechdel is profiled by Vermont's Seven Days internet magazine.
  - The nominees for the 2006 Russ Manning Most Promising Newcomer Award are announced via a press release. Jonathan Bennett, R. Kikuo Johnson, Mark Page, Aaron Renier and Chris Samnee are the five artists nominated.
  - Canada's The Gazette discuss the refusal of Indigo Books and Music to carry the latest Harper's in the context of freedom of speech.

=== June ===
- June 1:
  - ComicFoundry interview Kevin Huizenga.
  - Bob Levin discusses Alex Toth for The Comics Journal.
  - Newsarama report that the CBLDF have filed a motion to dismiss in the case of Gordon Lee, a comic book retailer charged with distributing materials which are alleged to be harmful to minors.
  - Tom Spurgeon comments on the Harvey Awards nominations for 2006, in which Marvel Comics receive the most nominations.
- June 2:
  - Australia's The Age report on a difficult year for cartoonists.
  - Turkish cartoonist Musa Gümüş wins the 8th PortoCartoon World Festival grand prize, awarded by the National Printing Museum, in Portugal.
  - Editor & Publisher report that the Union of Concerned Scientists are launching two cartoon contests, hoping to "encourage amateur and professional cartoonists alike to express concern -- through humor and art -- about the impact of the abuse of science on our safety, health, and environment."
  - The Los Angeles Times discuss the homosexual interpretations of superheroes, and how these will impact upon the forthcoming Superman Returns film.
  - The CBLDF issue a statement outlining their reasons for filing motions to dismiss in the case against Gordon Lee.
  - Joe Sinasac comments on the June issue of Harper's, which featured Art Spiegelman's comments on the Jyllands-Posten Muhammad cartoons controversy for the Catholic Register
- June 4:
  - The New York Times review Mome, Ganges and La Perdida.
- June 7:
  - ICv2.com report that Random House Publishing Group division Villard are to collect Elk's Run by Joshua Hale Fialkov and Noel Tuazo in a graphic novel.
- June 9:
  - The 2006 MOCCA Festival begins.
- June 10:
  - Denis Kitchen and John Lind announce formation of Kitchen, Lind & Associates. A company offering artist representation and book packaging of graphic novels for publishers.
- June 11:
  - The Washington Post profile Dan Nadel, author of Art Out of Time: Unknown Comics Visionaries, 1900–1969.
- June 12:
  - Wes Hargis and Hollis Brown rename their strip "Franklin Fibbs", choosing instead the name "Little Fibbs" in an attempt to avoid "pigeon-holing their strip as one aimed at seniors".
- June 15:
  - The Metro report that Spider-Man is to reveal his secret identity as part of Marvel's Civil War storyline. Editor-in-chief Joe Quesada describes it as "one of the biggest revelations in comic book history".
- June 29:
  - PBS discuss Tintin and his status as a work of comic art in the United States, and ask six leading comics artists to comment on Herge's creation.

=== July ===
- July 7:
  - Indigo Books and Music, Canada's largest bookseller, refuses to carry another magazine, Free Inquiry which reprints some of the cartoons at the centre of the controversy. Indigo had previously withdrawn the June edition of Harper's.
  - Tony Millionaire is interviewed by Suicidegirls.com.
- July 8:
  - Denis Kitchen discusses the future plans of the Eisner estate with Eisner biographer Bob Andelman.
- July 9:
  - The Malaysia Star looks at the growth in digital manga.
  - Zapiro discusses the suit for defamation filed against him by former deputy president Jacob Zuma.
- July 10:
  - Blogcritics.org review Alan Moore's forthcoming Lost Girls.
  - The Mercury News profiles Stan Lee.
  - The Book Standard discuss the challenges facing publishers of comics and graphic novels.
- July 11:
  - The Village Voice discuss Alison Bechdel's new work, Fun Home.
  - Editor & Publisher discuss reports that Johnny Hart's 3 July BC. strip was insulting of Islam.
  - India is reportedly taking to the graphic novel format.
  - The Times discusses the wish fulfillment nature of Superman.
  - Daily Press.com report on the influence John Henry may have had on the visual iconography of the superhero.
- July 12:
  - The Australian report on the collecting of back issues.
  - Denis Kitchen is interviewed by On Milwaukee.
  - Reporters without Borders warn Jacob Zuma against suing the media for defamation, noting "A successful lawsuit by you would give a blank cheque to Africa's authoritarian regimes, which would use your example to attack their own press". Amongst those currently being sued over reports regarding Zuma's recent trial for alleged rape is the cartoonist Zapiro. Zuma was found to be not guilty of the crime.
  - An online editorial in The Baltimore Examiner discusses the issues of free speech which face a cartoonist, prompted by the controversy.
- July 13:
  - Website Hour interviews Jim Woodring.
  - The Star-Gazette profile Virgin Comics.
  - John Woo and Garth Ennis are to collaborate on a comic book for Virgin Comics.
  - Virgin Comics and Panini Comics sign a deal to cover licensing of Virgin Comics publications in Continental Europe and Latin America.
- July 14:
  - French cartoonist Sempé is honoured with the Ordre des Arts et des Lettres.
  - The nominations for the 2006 Doug Wright Awards are announced.
  - It is reported that Musa Kart has won the Turkish Journalists' Association's "2006 Freedom of the Press Award", which will be awarded on 24 July at Dolmabahçe Palace.
  - The Toronto Star report that Indigo Books & Music refusal to carry the June edition of Harper's magazine may have boosted sales. The magazine featured Art Spiegelman's thoughts on caricature and also reprints cartoons at the centre of the Toronto Star
  - The Edmonton Journal discusses webcomics.
  - Comics retailer Brian Hibbert discusses the impact the move to trade paperbacks is having on sell-through in the comic book and graphic novel market.
- July 15:
  - The Arizona Daily Star reports that Garry Trudeau has been awarded the Vietnam Veterans of America's President's Award for Excellence in the Arts.
- July 16:
  - The Washington Post discusses the issues surrounding Alan Moore's forthcoming Lost Girls and the manner in which comic book retailers will handle it.
  - The San Diego Union-Tribune runs articles on Daniel Clowes, San Diego Comic-Con founder Shel Dorf and the convention itself as a preview to this week's convention.
- July 17: Daryl Cagle comments on the effects the "Orphan Works Act of 2006" will have on cartoonists if it is enacted.
  - ICv2.com report on graphic novel and comic book sales for the month of June.
  - The Web Cartoonists' Choice Awards are announced with The Perry Bible Fellowship winning the "Outstanding Comic" award.
  - The Hindustan Times report on the number of books and graphic novels being released by Indian artists based on characters from Indian mythology.
- July 18:
  - The Independent looks at the comic book adaptation of the official inquiry into the 9/11 attacks.
  - DC Comics promote Karen Berger to Senior Vice President—Executive Editor, Vertigo.
- July 19:
  - Two members of Marvel Comics' licensing team have left the company, according to an ICv2.com report.
  - The Kansas City Infozine review "Enduring Outrage: Editorial Cartoons by Herblock", an exhibition of selected works by the cartoonist at the United States Library of Congress.

=== August ===
- August 8: The Chemistry Set launches.
- August 9: Launch of "Connections", in 2000 AD #1500, the introduction to the major Judge Dredd storyline "Origins" (by John Wagner and Kev Walker).
- August 31: Hill & Wang release The 9/11 Report: A Graphic Adaptation by Sid Jacobson and Ernie Colón. The project is done under the blessing of 9/11 Commission co-chairs Thomas Kean and Lee H. Hamilton, who wrote a foreword to the book.

=== September ===
- September 4: Argentina celebrates the first "Día de la Historieta" (National Comics Day).
- September 13: The Judge Dredd main "Origins" storyline starts (by John Wagner and Carlos Ezquerra).
- September 30: During the Stripdagen in Houten, the Netherlands, Gerard Leever receives the Stripschapprijs. Gerrit de Jager and Jean-Marc van Tol win the P. Hans Frankfurtherprijs for Strips in Stereo. Willy Lohmann, Jan van Haasteren, Raymond Bär van Hemmersweil and Jan van Reek win the Bulletje en Boonestaakschaal.

=== October ===
- October 11: The Best American series releases the inaugural The Best American Comics publication. The collection is edited by Harvey Pekar and Anne Elizabeth Moore.
- October 18: The Authority #1 released (by Grant Morrison and Gene Ha).
  - 1001 Nights of Snowfall hardcover edition released under the Vertigo imprint (by Bill Willingham).
  - Wildcats #1 released (by Grant Morrison and Jim Lee).
- The Flemish comics magazine/fanzine Stripgids is relaunched and receives a new chief editor: Toon Horsten.

=== November ===
- November 1: Midnighter #1 released (by Garth Ennis and Chris Sprouse).

=== December ===
- December 13: Prog 2007 of 2000 AD released, a yearly extra length special that saw the start of two new series: Stickleback (by Ian Edginton and D'Israeli) and Kingdom (by Dan Abnett and Richard Elson).
- December 13: Neeraj Gupta's cartoon exhibition "Sansad Par Hamla" (translates to Attack on Parliament) opens on the fifth anniversary of the attack.
- December 20: The Spirit #1, written and drawn by Darwyn Cooke is released.

=== Specific date unknown ===
- Belgian comic artist Benoît Sokal is knighted in the Ordre des Arts et des Lettres.
- Bernard Hislaire's Le Ciel Au-Dessus de Bruxelles is published, a graphic novel about the love between a Jew and a Muslim set against the backdrop of the 2003 American-Iraqi War. The book is controversial for its anti-war message and explicit sex scenes.

== Deaths ==
=== January ===
- January 4: Stan Hunt, American cartoonist and columnist, dies at age 76.
- January 6: Yoshirou Kato, Japanese manga artist (Mappira-kun, Onboro Jinsei, Ore wa Obake dazo, Ojisoma Daimiyô, Geijigeji Tarô Gyôkôki, Motemote Ojisan, Sebiki no Ninja, Benben Monogatari), dies at age 79.
- January 8:
  - Manfred Bofinger, German cartoonist, caricaturist, dies at age 64.
  - Jamic, Belgian animator, illustrator, caricaturist and comics artist (Les Télé-Graphistes), dies at age 69.
- January 14: Jacques Faizant, French illustrator, political cartoonist and comics artist (Adam et Eve, Le Chimiste BP), dies at age 87.
- January 17: Norman McCabe, American animator and illustrator (Looney Tunes), dies at age 94.
- January 18: Rose Ellison King, American comics writer (Flo & Friends), dies from cancer.
- January 22: Albert Morse, American publisher (Morse's Funnies) and lawyer for Robert Crumb and other underground comics artists dies at age 67 from kidney disease.
- January 30: Seth Fisher, American comics artist (Green Lantern: Willworld), dies at age 33 from a fall from a roof.

=== February ===
- February 2:
  - Lo Hartog van Banda, Dutch comics writer-artist and TV writer (Arman en Ilva, contributed to Tom Poes, Panda and Eric de Noorman), dies at age 89.
  - Guglielmo Letteri, Italian comic book artist (worked on Tex Willer), dies at age 80.
- February 4: Myron Waldman, American animator and comics artist (Happy the Humbug, Eve: A Pictorial Love Story), dies at age 97.
- February 7: Andrea Bresciani, Slovenian-Italian animator and comics artist (Poldo, Saetta, Tony Falco, Geky Dor, Frontiers of Science), dies at age 83.
- February 13: Brummett Echohawk, American cartoonist, painter, novelist and actor, dies at age 83.
- February 17: Giovanni Gandini, Italian comics writer, artist and founder of the magazine Linus, dies at age 76.
- February 21: Ed Franklin, American political cartoonist, dies at age 84 or 85.

=== March ===
- March 13: Olimar Kallas, Estonian comics artist (Eksam XXI sajandisse, Ootamatu pärandus), dies at age 75.
- March 15: Vicente Vaño Ibarra, Spanish comic artist (Juan Mestizo, assisted on Milton, el Corsario and Roberto Alcázar y Pedrín), dies at age 58.
- March 17: Jaime Mainou, Spanish comics artist (Rolf Kauka, Disney comics), dies at age 75 or 76.
- March 20: Maurice Raymond, Canadian painter and comics artist (made a comic strip adaptation of Adélard Dugré's La Campagne Canadienne), dies at age 93.
- Specific date unknown: March: Björn Karlström, Swedish comics artist (Jan Winther, Johnny Wiking, En Resa i Människokroppen), dies at age 84 or 85.

=== April ===
- April 2: Buddy Blue, American rock(abilly) musician, music critic and champion underground comics in articles for the Los Angeles Times and other newspapers, dies of a heart attack at age 48.
- April 7: John Blackburn, American comics artist (Coley Cochran), dies at age 66–67.
- April 18: Dick Rockwell, American illustrator and comics artist (continued Steve Canyon), dies at age 85.
- April 21: Fred Burton, Belgian comics artist (Coleman Wallace, Fort Boyard), dies at age 42.
- April 29: Sid Barron, Canadian cartoonist (Canadian Heroes), dies at age 88.

=== May ===
- May 12: Ferdinando Tacconi, Italian comics artist (Gli Aristocrati, Nick Raider, Dylan Dog), dies at age 83.
- May 14: Bob Laughlin, American comics artist (the Kitz-n'-Katz series for Eclipse Comics), dies at age 80 or 81.
- May 23: Roger Camille, aka Kiko, Egyptian-Belgian comics artist (Djinn, Foufi), dies at age 69.
- May 25: Bob Mau, Belgian comics artist (Kari Lente), dies at age 80.
- May 27: Alex Toth, American comics artist and animator (Space Ghost), dies at age 77 from a heart attack.
- May 30: George Shedd, American comics artist (Marlin Keel, assisted on Captain America, Li'l Abner), dies at age 73 or 74.

=== June ===
- June 8: Jaxon, American underground comix artist (God Nose), dies at age 65, apparently having committed suicide.
- June 11:
  - Tim Hildebrandt, American illustrator and comics artist (reboot of Terry and the Pirates), dies at age 67.
  - Nicolaas Wijnberg, AKA Montevino, Dutch illustrator and comics artist, dies at age 87.
- June 14: Jean Roba, Belgian comics artist (Boule et Bill, La Ribambelle), dies at age 75.
- June 15: Frantisek Kobik, Czech illustrator and comics artist (Vzpoura Mozku, Kronik Strazeu, Galaxie and Öperace Jericho), dies at age 72.
- June 24: Lyle Stuart, American business manager (EC Comics), dies at age 83.
- June 30: Robert Gernhardt, German poet, writer, painter and cartoonist (co-founder of Titanic), dies at age 68.

=== July ===
- July 7: Eduardo Barbosa, Brazilian architect, journalist and comics artist (historical and biographical comics), dies at age 91 or 92.
- July 14: Tom Frame, British comics letterer (Judge Dredd), dies of cancer at age 74 or 75.
- July 17: Mickey Spillane, American crime novelist and comics writer, dies at age 88. Spillane contributed text pieces to comic books early in his career.
- July 23: Vernon Grant, American comics artist (The Love Rangers), dies at age 71.
- July 27:
  - Carlos Roque, Portuguese comics artist (Malaquias, Angélique, Wladimyr), dies at age 70.
  - W.G. van de Hulst jr., Dutch illustrator, painter and comics artist (In de Soete Suikerbol), dies at age 89.

=== August ===
- August 1: Bob Thaves, American comics artist (Frank and Ernest), dies at age 81.
- August 26: Ed Sullivan, American comic artist (Beyond the Stained Glass, continued Out Our Way With The Willets and Priscilla's Pop), dies from cancer at age 76 or 77.

=== September ===
- September 5: John McLusky, British comics artist (the James Bond comic series for the Daily Express), dies at age 83.
- September 12: Nato, Chilean comics artist (Cachupín, Ponchito, continued Toribio, el Náufrago), dies at age 85.
- September 14: Myron Fass, American comics publisher, writer and artist (Tales of Terror) dies at age 80.
- September 18: Johnn Bakker, Dutch comics artist (Blook, Dan Teal, the Suske en Wiske parody De Keizerkraker), dies at age 59.
- September 20: Ernie Schroeder, American comics artist (Heap) dies at age 90.
- September 22: Liao Bing-xiong, Chinese comics artist (Spring and Autumn in Cat Kingdom), dies at age 90 or 91.

=== October ===
- October 3: Terry Aspin, British comics artist (made comics for girl comics magazines like Jinty, Bunty, Debbie and Mandy), dies at age 90.
- October 13: Hilda Terry, American comics artist (Teena), dies at age 92.
- October 18: Don R. Christensen, American animator, comics artist and writer (Disney comics, Looney Tunes comics, Walter Lantz comics Hanna-Barbera comics), dies at age 90.
- October 20: Ab'Aigre, aka Pascal Habegger, Swiss illustrator and comics artist (Le Chaman, Nombre, Blues), dies at age 47.
- October 20: R.K. Sloane, American underground comics artist (Ric Sloane Comics, Rat Fink Comics), dies at age 56.
- October 21: Paul Biegel, Dutch novelist, journalist and comics writer (wrote for Kappie), dies at age 81.
- October 24: Dino Leonetti, Italian comics artist (Maghella), dies at age 69.

=== November ===
- November 10: Jack Williamson, American novelist and comics writer (Beyond Mars), dies at age 98.
- November 15: René Sterne, Belgian comics artist (Adler), dies at age 54.
- November 18:
  - Marien Verkaik, Dutch comics artist (Scotty Clay, Angie, Penny de Pony, Happy der Hund), dies at age 59.
  - Karel Verleyen, Belgian novelist and comics writer (scripted episodes of De Lustige Kapoentjes and Piet Fluwijn en Bolleke when Jean-Pol drew it), dies at age 68 from cancer.
- November 23: Jerry Bails, American comics critic and publisher (Founder of the fanzines Alter Ego, The Comicollector, On the Drawing Board and The Comic Reader. Founder of the Alley Award and indexed several comics and their authors), dies at age 73 of a heart attack.
- November 25:
  - Luciano Bottaro, Italian comics artist and writer (Pepito, Pon Pon, Baldo, Whisky & Gogo, Gio Polpetta, Maramao, Disney comics), dies at age 75.
  - Gianluca Lerici, aka Professor Bad Trip, Italian comics artist (made a comic book adaptation of Naked Lunch), dies at age 43.
- November 26: Dave Cockrum, American comics artist (X-Men, The Avengers, Superboy), dies at age 63.
- November 29: Jean Dulieu, Dutch comics artist, novelist, radio and TV scriptwriter and actor (Paulus de Boskabouter (Paulus the Woodgnome)), dies at age 85.
- November 30: Hélio Lage, Brazilian cartoonist (L'Amu Tuju L'Amu, Tudo Bem...), dies at age 60.

=== December ===
- December 2: Don Dohler, American film director, magazine publisher and comics artist (Pro Junior), dies at age 60 from cancer.
- December 5: Joacy Jamys, Brazilian comics artist, dies at age 35 from a stroke.
- December 9: Martin Nodell, American comics artist (creator of the Golden Age Green Lantern), dies at age 91.
- December 17: Joe Gill, American comics writer (co-creator of Captain Atom, Peacemaker, Judomaster, Doomsday + 1), dies at age 87.
- December 18:
  - Joseph Barbera, American animator (Hanna-Barbera comics, Tom & Jerry, The Flintstones, Scooby-Doo), dies at age 95.
  - Luis Wilson Vilera, Cuban political cartoonist and comic artist (Las Criollitas, Los Sueños de Musi, Playa Girón, Las Melli), dies at age 76.
- December 19: Jack Burnley, American comics artist (continued Superman and co-creator of Starman), dies at age 95.
- December 24:
  - Gino d'Antonio, Italian comics artist (Il Storia del West), dies at age 79.
  - Albert Jaminon, Belgian painter, sculptor, comic artist, animator and educator (Une Mission du Capitaine d'Artagnan), dies at age 81.

=== Specific date unknown ===
- Ivica Koljanin, Serbian comics artist (Nesalomljivi, Trifun), dies at age 71 or 72.
- Bennie Nobori, American animator and comics artist (Yankee Reporter), dies at an unknown age.
- Patrick Van Lierde, Belgian comics artist (continued Bessy), dies at age 59 or 60.
- Mieczyslaw Wisniewski, Polish comic artist (worked on Kapitan Zbik, Podziemny Front), dies at age 80 or 81.

== Exhibitions and shows ==
- August 25, 2005 – April 26: "À l'école de l'amour" by Julie Doucet at the Centre d'art et de diffusion Clark, Montreal, Quebec, Canada
- October 1, 2005 – April 30: "Gross, Gruesome and Gothic" at the Cartoon Art Museum, San Francisco, US
- October 22, 2005 – March 31:Le Monde de Zep at The Jardin d'Acclimatation, Paris, France
- November 20, 2005 – March 13: "Masters of American Comics" at the Museum of Contemporary Art, Los Angeles and the UCLA Hammer Museum, Los Angeles, US
- December 22, 2005 – April 30: "Why Do They Hate U.S.? An International Perspective on American Politics and Culture" at the Cartoon Art Museum, San Francisco, US
- 1 December 2005 – April 30:Drawn From The Collection at The National Gallery of Victoria, Australia
- January 17 – October 8: Caricatures de fumeurs, du XVIIe siècle à nos jours at the Musée du Fumeur, Paris, France
- January 19 – July 9: "Seth" at the Macdonald Stewart Art Centre, Guelph, Canada
- January 20 – February 25: "Speak: Nine Cartoonists" at the Pratt Manhattan Gallery, New York City, US
- January 24 – February 19: "Alternative Girlhood: Diaristic Indulgence and Contemporary Female Artists" at the Tower Fine Arts Gallery, State University of New York, Brockport, US
- January 26 – March 18: "Misunderestimating the President through Cartoons" at the Political Cartoon Gallery, London, UK
- January 26 – May 28: "Georges Wolinski Exhibition" at the Centre national de la bande dessinée et de l'image, France
- January 27 – March 5: "Black Moon Island: Contemporary International Drawing" at One in the Other, London, UK
- February 1 – April 9: "ISRAEL: The Cartoonists' Diagnosis: A Viewpoint From Within" at the Cartoon Art Museum, San Francisco, US
- February 2 – March 11: "Fine Line" at the Adam Baumgold Gallery, New York City, US
- February 4 – May 29: "Sugar and Spice: Little Girls in the Funnies" at the Charles M. Schulz Museum, Santa Rosa, California US
- February 7 – April 8: "Comic Art in Democratic Spain: 1975–2005/6" at the Instituto Cervantes New York, New York City, US
- February 10 – March 11: "Chippendale.Hong.Lyon.Paper Rad" at the Gallery Agniel, Providence, US
- February 11 – May 7: "Small Press Spotlight Featuring: Gene Yang" at the Cartoon Art Museum, San Francisco, US
- February 22 – April 8: "Neo Sincerity: The Difference Between the Comic and the Cosmic is a Single Letter" at Apexart, New York City, US
- February 25 – May 1: The Museum of Comic and Cartoon Art host "Todd McFarlane: A Retrospective Exhibit", New York City, US
- March 7–17: "The Art of V For Vendetta" at The Guardian newsroom, London, UK
- March 11 – April 30: Francesca Ghermandi dedicherà il suo nuovo libro "Un'estate a Tombstone", Modena, Italy
- March 14 – April 18: "The Michael Winner Collection of Donald McGill", Chris Beetles Gallery, London, UK
- March 23 – May 21: "The Man Who Hated Pooh! The Political Cartoons of E. H. Shepard" at the Political Cartoon Gallery, London, UK
- March 25 "Alan Moore on Gothic Nightmares" at Tate Britain, London, UK
- March 30 – April 29: "Segismundo y otros mundos" by Sylvia Libedinsky at La Sala Vincon, Barcelona, Spain
- March 31 – June 25: Satirical Portraits: The Style of Nick Anderson at the Toledo Museum of Art, Toledo, Ohio
- April – September: "Satirical London: 300 years of irreverent images" at the Museum of London, London, UK
- April 1 – June 25: "No Straight Lines: Queer Culture and the Comics" at the Cartoon Art Museum, San Francisco, US
- April 5 – May 6: "Glen Baxter: Tungsten Dawning" at Flowers Central, London, UK
- April 7 – July 2: "Fizzers: The Alternative National Portrait Gallery" at the Scottish National Portrait Gallery, Edinburgh, UK
- April 10 – June 16: "Steve Bell Does Art" at the University of Leeds Gallery, Leeds, UK
- April 17–30: The Mathematical Explanations Behind Silly Drawings at The Custard Factory, Birmingham, UK
- April 26 – May 31: "The Strip Exhibition" at the Nest Gallery, Brighton, UK
- April 29 – August 13: "Masters of American Comics" at the Milwaukee Art Museum Milwaukee, US
- April 29 – May 3: "Stripburger: Honey Talks" at the Grrr! Festival, Serbia
- May 6 – May 14: "She Draws Comics: 100 Years of America's Women Cartoonists" at the Museum of Comic and Cartoon Art, New York City, US
- May 6 – September 3: "Chris Ware" at the Museum of Contemporary Art, Chicago, US
- June 1 – August 31: "A Tale of the Jungle Imps by Felix Fiddle" by Winsor McCay at Ohio State University Cartoon Research Library, Ohio, US
- June 9 – August 31: "Stripburger: Honey Talks" at the Serietiket, Stockholm, Sweden
- June 24 – August 31: "OPOLIS: A Comix Fluxture" at the Flux Factory, New York City, US
- September 15 – January 6, 2007: "Wunderground: Providence, 1995 To The Present" at the RISD Museum, Providence, Rhode Island, US
- September 15 – January 28, 2007: "Masters of American Comics" at the Jewish Museum, New York City; and The Newark Museum of Art, Newark, New Jersey

== Conventions ==
- January 14: Big Apple Comic Book Art, and Toy Show I (Penn Plaza Pavilion, New York City, US)
- January 25–28: Angoulême International Comics Festival, Angoulême, France
- February 10–12: WonderCon, San Francisco, US
- February 24–26: MegaCon, Orange County Convention Center, Orlando, Florida, US – Special guest: George Pérez; other guests: Sal Buscema, Bob Andelman, Mark Brooks, Amanda Conner, Chuck Dixon, Steve Epting, Greg Land, Michael Lark, Laura Martin, Phil Noto, Jimmy Palmiotti, Mike Perkins, Brandon Peterson, Brian Pulido, Andy Runton, William Tucci, Ethan Van Sciver, Robert Venditti, John Schneider, Tony Amendola, Steve Bacic, Julie Benz, Jason Carter, Alexis Cruz, Mira Furlan, John Kassir, Clare Kramer, Cirroc Lofton, Chris Rankin, Tanya Roberts, Sean Schemmel, Tracy Scoggins, Marina Sirtis, and Jamie Yeates
- February 24–26: New York Comic Con, New York City, US
- March 3–6: Napoli Comicon, Naples, Italy
- March 4: STAPLE! (Red Oak Ballroom, Austin, Texas, US) – guests: Tony Millionaire, Jim Mahfood, David Hopkins, and winners of the Xeric Foundation grant for comic book self-publishers
- March 11: UK Web & Mini Comix Thing, London, UK
- March 12: New York Comic Book Spectacular (New York City, US) – guests include Mike Grell, Joe Sinnott, Dick Ayers, and Keith Williams
- March 17–19: Wizard World Los Angeles, (Long Beach Convention Center, Long Beach, California, US)
- March 31 – April 2: Small Press Expo, Stockholm, Sweden
- April 1: Fluke: A Mini-comics/Zine Explosion, Athens, Georgia, US
- April 1–2: Emerald City Comicon, (Qwest Field Event Center, Seattle, Washington, US) – guests: J. G. Jones, Stuart Immonen, Steve Niles, Roman Dirge, Pia Guerra, Sean Phillips, Tony Harris, Alé Garza, Tim Vigil, Jason Pearson, Rob Liefeld, Patrick Zircher, Cully Hamner, Erik Larsen, Doug Mahnke, Adam Hughes, Jonathan & Joshua Luna, Rick Leonardi, Dan Brereton, Brian Stelfreeze, Corey Lewis, Jim Mahfood, Ryan Ottley, Francis Manapul, Scott Kurtz, Michael Lark, Bob Schreck, Ed Brubaker, Alex Maleev, Matt Wagner, Tim Sale, Clayton Crain, James O'Barr, John Layman, Josh Ortega, Mike Bullock, Brom, Tony Moore, and Scott Morse
- April 1–9: Fumetto International Comix Festival, Lucerne, Switzerland
- April 8–9: APE: The Alternative Press Expo, San Francisco, US
- April 21–23: Pittsburgh Comicon (Radisson Hotel Pittsburgh ExpoMart, Monroeville, Pennsylvania, US) – 8,400 attendees; guests include George Pérez, Brian Michael Bendis, Jimmy Palmiotti, Amanda Conner, Jim Balent, Adam Hughes, Greg Horn, Michael Turner, Mark Waid, Bob McLeod, Howard Chaykin, Arthur Suydam, Timothy Truman, Joseph Michael Linsner, Bruno Sammartino, Ray Park, Ed Piskor, and Ron Frenz
- April 23: Toronto ComiCON Fan Appreciation Event (Metro Toronto Convention Centre, Toronto, Ontario, Canada)
- April 28–30: Toronto Comicon ("Paradise Comics Toronto Comicon"), National Trade Centre, Hall C, Toronto, Ontario, Canada – guests of honor: George Pérez and David Lloyd
- April 29–30: Dallas Comic Con ("DCC7") (Plano Centre, Plano, Texas) – guests include Bernie Wrightson, Dave Dorman, Tony Harris, Howard Chaykin, Steve Niles, Norm Breyfogle, James O'Barr, Josh Howard, Tom Hodges, Kerry Gammill, Ben Dunn, Jim Daly, David Hopkins, and Tim Bradstreet
- May 6–7: Comicdom Con Athens, Athens, Greece
- May 13: Small Press and Alternative Comics Expo (S.P.A.C.E.), Ohio Expo Center, Rhodes Center, Columbus, Ohio, US – special guests: Dave Sim and Gerhard
- May 13–14: Comic Expo (British Empire & Commonwealth Exhibition Hall, Bristol, UK) – guest of honor Roy Thomas; other guests include Geoff Johns, Howard Chaykin, David Lloyd, and Liam Sharp. Presentation of the Eagle Awards.
- May 19–20: East Coast Black Age of Comics Convention (Temple University Anderson Hall, Philadelphia, Pennsylvania, US) – presentation of the Glyph Comics Awards
- May 20: Olympia Comics Festival, Olympia, Washington, US
- May 20–21: Motor City Comic Con I (Rock Financial Showplace, Novi, Michigan, US) – guests include Adam West, Burt Ward, David Faustino, and Jerri Manthey
- June 2–4: Wizard World Philadelphia (Philadelphia Convention Center, Philadelphia, Pennsylvania)
- June 3–4: Stripdagen Haarlem, Haarlem, Netherlands
- June 10–11: MoCCA Art Festival, New York City, US
- June 15–18: Comic-Salon, Erlangen, Germany
- June 24–25: Adventure Con 5 (Knoxville Convention Center, Knoxville, Tennessee, US) – 5,000 attendees
- June 30 – July 2: Heroes Convention (Charlotte Convention Center, Charlotte, North Carolina) – guests include Warren Ellis, J. Michael Straczynski, Bryan Hitch, Peter Bagge, Los Bros Hernandez, Art Adams, Chris Pitzer, Bob Almond, Mark Bagley, Michael Bair, John Beatty, Frank Beddor, Christian Beranek, Ivan Brandon, Mark Brooks, Jeffrey Brown, Steven Butler, Nick Cardy, Richard Case, John Cassaday, Tommy Castillo, C. B. Cebulski, Bernard Chang, Travis Charest, Sean Chen, Cliff Chiang, Mark Chiarello, Michael Choi, Dave Cockrum, Paty Cockrum, Jordan Crane, Peter David, Rosario Dawson, Vito Delsante, Todd Dezago, Dan Didio, Colleen Doran, Ben Dunn, Kieron Dwyer, Tommy Lee Edwards, Rod Espinosa, Tom Feister, Ian Flynn, Matt Fraction, Francesco Francavilla, Rob G., Christos Gage, Keith Giffen, Craig Gilmore, Keron Grant, Cully Hamner, Scott Hampton, Tony Harris, Irwin Hasen, Jeremy Haun, Russ Heath, Mario Hernandez, Tom Hodges, Adam Hughes, Jamal Igle, Tony Isabella, James Jean, Georges Jeanty, Paul Jenkins, J. G. Jones, Nat Jones, Diego Jourdan, James Kochalka, Scott Kurtz, Erik Larsen, Jason Latour, John Paul Leon, John Lucas, Jonathan Luna, Joshua Luna, David W. Mack, Jim Mahfood, Mike Manley, Laura Martin, Nathan Massengill, Ed McGuinness, Mark Millar, Dan Mishkin, B. Clay Moore, Terry Moore, Tony Moore, Chris Moreno, Steve Niles, Martin Nodell, Phil Noto, James O'Barr, Michael Avon Oeming, Joshua Ortega, James A. Owen, Jason Pearson, Andrew Pepoy, George Pérez, Brandon Peterson, Mark Poole, Paul Pope, Joe Pruett, Joe Quesada, Tom Raney, Rick Remender, Alex Robinson, Budd Root, Don Rosa, Craig Rousseau, Greg Rucka, Andy Runton, Tim Sale, Alex Saviuk, Dash Shaw, Rick Spears, Roxanne Starr, Joe Staton, Brian Stelfreeze, Karl Story, Arthur Suydam, Mark Texeira, Roy Thomas, George Tuska, Ethan Van Sciver, Robert Venditti, Charles Vess, Dexter Vines, Loston Wallace, Daniel Way, Steven Weissman, Mike Wieringo, Renée Witterstaetter, Brian Wood, Tracy Yardley
- July 1–2: London Film & Comic Con, London, UK
- July 20–23: San Diego Comic-Con, San Diego, US
- August 3–6: Wizard World Chicago (Donald E. Stephens Convention Center, Rosemont, Illinois, US) – 58,000 attendees; guest of honor: Jeph Loeb
- August 5–6: "CAPTION Remix", East Oxford Community Center, Oxford, UK
- August 18–20: Animecon IV, Helsinki, Finland
- September: Montreal Comic-con (Place Bonaventure, Montreal, Quebec) – first edition of this convention
- September 1–4: Dragon Con (Hyatt Regency Atlanta/Marriott Marquis/Atlanta Hilton, Atlanta, Georgia) – 25,000+ attendees; guests include George Takei, Mickey Rooney, Summer Glau, and George A. Romero
- September 1–3: Fan Expo Canada (Metro Toronto Convention Centre, Toronto, Ontario, Canada) – 42,947 attendees; guests include William Shatner, Leonard Nimoy, Carrie Fisher, Alice Cooper, Linda Blair, James Callis, Gates McFadden, Robert Picardo, Jeffrey Combs, Verne Troyer, Karen Black, Rowdy Roddy Piper, Brian Michael Bendis, Geoff Johns, Ethan Van Sciver, Mike Mignola, Roman Dirge, and Josh Middleton
- September 8–10: Raptus Bergen International Comics Festival, Bergen, Norway
- September 10: X-Trava Con Comic Book, Toy and Non-Sport Card Show (Knights of Columbus Hall, Livonia, Michigan, US) – produced by Motor City Conventions, parent company of the Motor City Comic Con
- September 9–10: Baltimore Comic-Con, Baltimore, US
- September 15–17: Comics Salon (Bratislava, Slovakia)
- September 16–17: Big Apple Comic Book Art, and Toy Show II (Penn Plaza Pavilion, New York City, US) – guests include Neal Adams, Howard Chaykin, and Ernie Colón
- September 23–24: Phoenix Comicon (Mesa, Arizona, US) – 2,600 attendees; special guests: Christine Auten, Greg Ayres, Johnny Yong Bosch, Shannon Denton, Christy Lijewski
- October 6–28: Comica — London International Comics Festival (Institute of Contemporary Arts and UCL Institute of Education, London, UK) — organized by Paul Gravett; guests include Scott McCloud, Marjane Satrapi, Alison Bechdel, Alan Moore, Melinda Gebbie, Guy Delisle, Michel Faber, Sonia Leong, ILYA, Steven Appleby, David Quantick, Stewart Lee, Ben Katchor, Peter Blegvad, Lea DeLaria, Lisa Gornick, Peter Stanbury, Tara McPherson
- October 12–14: International Comic Arts Forum (Library of Congress, Washington, D.C.) — guests include Jules Feiffer, Rupert Bazambanza & Ellen Yamshon, Phil Jimenez, Dennis O'Neil, Stuart Moore, and Jamal Igle
- October 12: Komikazen (Ravenna, Italy) – guests include Danijel Zezelj, Jessica Lurie, and Vittorio Giardino
- October 13–14: Small Press Expo (Bethesda North Marriott Hotel & Conference Center, Bethesda, Maryland, US)
- October 14–15: Motor City Comic Con II (Rock Financial Showplace, Novi, Michigan, US) – guests include Guy Davis, William Messner-Loebs, James O'Barr, Ken Osmond, Robert Culp, Lori Petty, and Michael Dorn
- October 27–28: Stumptown Comics Fest (Oregon Convention Center, Portland, Oregon, US) – event expands to two days
- October 28–29: Dallas Comic Con ("DCC8") (Plano Centre, Plano, Texas) – guests include Brian Stelfreeze, Phil Noto, Paul Gulacy, Steve Rude, Mike Grell, Ron Frenz, Mark Brooks, Kerry Gammill, Steve Erwin, Tom Hodges, Cal Slayton, and Ben Dunn
- November 4–5: Manitoba Comic Con (Assiniboine Gordon Hotel, Winnipeg, Manitoba, Canada) – guests: George Freeman, Digital Chameleon alumni
- November 10–12: Wizard World Texas (Arlington Convention Center, Dallas, Texas)
- November 17–19: Big Apple Comic Book Art, and Toy Show III (Penn Plaza Pavilion, New York City, US)
- November 25: (Note: Preceded on the evening of Friday 24 November by a pub quiz in the Bull and Castle, Christ Church.) Dublin City Comic Con (Temple Bar Music Centre, Dublin, Ireland) — first annual show, organized by the 3rd Place comic shop; guests include: Mark Millar, Bryan Hitch, Paul Cornell, Trevor Hairsine, Adi Granov, Nick Roche, Liam Sharp
- November 25–26: Mid-Ohio Con (Columbus Convention Center, Columbus, Ohio, US) – first year at the Columbus Convention Center

== First issues by title ==
Blue Space
Release: by Glénat. Writer: Richard Marazano Artist: Chris Lamquet

Captain Cutaneum
Writer: Ruskin R Lines, III

Captain Nemo
Release: March 1 by Seven Seas Entertainment. Writer: Jason DeAngelis Artist: Aldin Viray
Cobb: Off the Leash
Release: May by IDW Publishing. Writer: Beau Smith Artist: Eduardo Barreto
Damnation Crusade (6-issue mini-series)
Release: December by Boom! Studios. Writers: Dan Abnett and Ian Edginton. Art by: Lui Antonio and JM Ringuet.

Jimbo's Inferno
Release: April 2006. Writer/Artist: Gary Panter

A Kiss for my Prince
Release: by Infinity Studios. Writer/Artist: Kim Hee-eun

Meltdown
Release: December 2006. Writer:David Schwartz Artist: Sean Wang

Star Wars: Legacy
Release: Issue 0 June. Writers: John Ostrander and Jan Duursema Art by: Jan Duursema

The Trials of Shazam!
Release: October 2006. Writer: Judd Winick Artist: Howard Porter

Zombies! Eclipse of the Undead
Release: September by IDW Publishing
