= Fighting Gravity =

Fighting Gravity may refer to:

- Fighting Gravity (band), a Ska-Pop Music Group based out of Richmond, Virginia
- Fighting Gravity (film), a 2009 documentary about women in ski jumping competitions
