= The Sheaf =

Student Run Newspaper

- Type: Weekly student newspaper
- Format: Broadsheet
- Owner: The Sheaf Publishing Society
- Editor: J.C. Balicanta Narag
- Staff writers: 11
- Founded: 1912
- Headquarters: Memorial Union Building; University of Saskatchewan; Saskatoon, Saskatchewan, Canada
- Website: www.thesheaf.com

The Sheaf is a student-run newspaper serving the University of Saskatchewan in Saskatoon, Saskatchewan since 1912. A new issue comes out every Thursday with approximately 3,000 copies per issue.

The Sheaf is a student-run non-profit organization. It receives part of its operating budget from U of S students in the form of a direct-levy; the remainder of the revenue is generated through advertising. The financial affairs are governed by a board of directors, most of whom are students.

== Mission ==
The mission of The Sheaf is to inform and entertain students by addressing those issues that are relevant to life on campus, in the city, or in the province. The newspaper is also meant to be a forum for discussion on a wide range of issues that concern students.

The paper is written for students by students. Most of the staff (editors, photographers, artists) are student-journalists. With this composition, The Sheaf tries to stay in touch with students on this campus. It offers unique insight to university issues through a student perspective.

== Contents ==
The Sheaf is divided into four main sections: news, opinions, culture, and sports & health — especially focusing on the University of Saskatchewan Huskies. Feature articles and special sections sometimes fall outside the main sections. The Sheaf's website has had a fifth section — technology — since 2011.

== Editorial policy ==
The Editor-in-Chief has the right to veto any submission deemed unfit for the Society newspaper. In determining this the editor will decide if the article or artwork would be of interest to a significant portion of the society and benefit the welfare of the readers. The Sheaf will not publish any racist, sexist, homophobic, or libelous material.

All undergraduate students at the University of Saskatchewan are members of The Sheaf Publishing Society. Students are encouraged to contribute content to the newspaper.

== Organizational structure ==
All University of Saskatchewan undergraduate students are considered members of The Sheaf Publishing Society, giving each the right to have a say in the operation of the newspaper, which includes standing for (or voting for) the board of directors.

The board of directors is the executive arm of the Society. It is the legal representative for the organization. It sets and administers the budget, determines employee contracts, the acquisition and liquidation of assets, and sets goals for the Society.

Under the board, there are the Business and Advertising Manager, Editor-in-Chief, Section Editors, and other staff members. The Business Manager is the Board's liaison in the office and is responsible for all accounting records, inventory, public relations, and office administration.

The Business and Advertising Manager is responsible for marketing, sales (revenue) generation, and is the representative of the newspaper to the business community.

The Editor-in-Chief oversees the publication of the paper and gives the editorial side its direction and focus. He/she will write, assign, and edit articles. This managing editor also runs meetings, develops new writers, and coordinates the paper with the Section Editors.

Section Editors also write, assign and edit articles, but they are more refined in their focus. Each one has a specific area of coverage: news, sports, entertainment, and features.

Also on staff are the Photography Editor, Production Manager, Graphics Editor, Copy Editor, Web Editor, and Delivery Coordinator.

== Notable Sheaf alumni ==
- Nelson Clarke, editor
- William Deverell, novelist and lawyer
- John G. Diefenbaker 13th Prime Minister of Canada
- Sylvia Fedoruk, 17th Lieutenant Governor of Saskatchewan
- Shauna Rempel, editor
- Brian Gable, The Globe and Mail editorial cartoonist
- Lucas Oleniuk, photographer
- Len Taylor, Saskatchewan politician at the municipal, provincial and federal levels of government

== See also ==
- Capitalist Piglet
- List of student newspapers in Canada
- List of newspapers in Canada
