= Captain Nemo (disambiguation) =

Captain Nemo is a fictional character in two novels by Jules Verne.

Captain Nemo may also refer to:

- "Captain Nemo" (song), by Swedish band Dive, later made famous by Sarah Brightman
- "Captain Nemo", an instrumental song on Michael Schenker Group's 1983 album Built to Destroy
- Captain Nemo, a 1968 album by The Sundowners
- The Undersea Adventures of Captain Nemo, a 1975 Canadian animated series of short cartoons
- Captain Nemo (comics), an Original English-language manga series
- Captain Nemo (miniseries), a 1975 Russian television miniseries
- Captain Nemo: The Fantastic History of a Dark Genius, a 2002 novel by Kevin J. Anderson
- Captain Nemo, a novel by Jan Matzal Troska
