= Stanley Hunt =

Stanley Hunt may refer to:

- Stanley C. Hunt (born 1954), Canadian, First Nations Kwakiutl artist
- Stanley Joseph Hunt (1894–1965), Canadian politician
- Stan Hunt (1929–2006), American newspaper cartoonist
