= Nelson Clarke =

Nelson Clarke (1914 – 1982) was a Canadian politician. Clarke was born in Regina, Saskatchewan in 1914.

Clarke studied at the University of Saskatchewan. During his student days he edited The Sheaf, the university newspaper, as well as working for the Canadian National Railway. He joined the Communist Party of Canada and became a party organizer in Saskatoon. With the popular front policy in place, Clarke and other communists joined the Co-operative Commonwealth Federation. Clarke was elected to the CCF Saskatchewan Provincial Council at the 1936 provincial convention. Within the CCF he was part of the 'Saskatoon group' along with Minerva Cooper and Harold Miller. He became the youngest person to be elected to the Saskatoon City Council. Clarke was later expelled from the CCF due to his Communist Party membership.

As the Communist Party was banned after Canada's entry into World War II (specifically due to the Molotov–Ribbentrop Pact), Clarke became a leader of its new front organization, the Labor-Progressive Party. He contested the 1944 Saskatchewan general election as a LPP candidate in the Saskatoon City riding. He headed the LPP Saskatchewan provincial organization during 1945–1947. He contested the 1953 Canadian federal election from the Moose Jaw—Lake Centre riding. At the 1956 National Convention of the LPP, he was elected to the National Executive Committee of the party. In the internal wrangles of the LPP, he belonged to the Tim Buck-led majority wing.

Clarke shifted to Toronto in the late 1950s, on instruction from the Communist Party. He served as the editor of the Canadian Tribune, the weekly party organ. In 1972 he contested the Toronto mayoral election. In his later years, Clarke became a prominent leader of the Toronto west-end tenants' rights struggles. During the 1970s, Clarke and his wife Phyllis became leaders of a current in the CPC influenced by Eurocommunism, advocating for a more pluralist approach to socialism and criticizing what they saw as the party's sectarianism towards mass movements. By 1979, increasingly skeptical that the CPC would be able to make the necessary changes, Clarke circulated a document influenced by socialist feminist ideas, raising the possibility of forming a new organization out of existing popular movements. Clarke died in 1982. His funeral was attended by some one thousand people.
