= David Schwartz (comic artist) =

American comic book author and screenwriter

David B. Schwartz
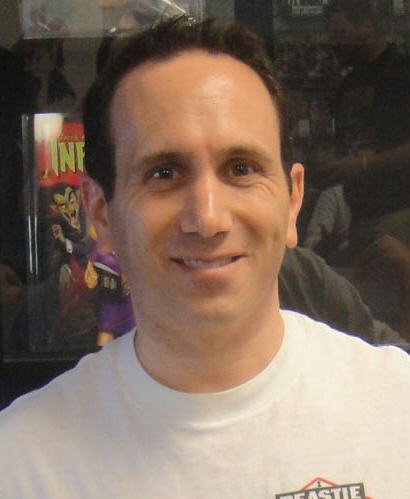
- Occupations: Author, screenwriter

David B. Schwartz is a comic book writer, storyboard artist, and screenwriter.

His first published work was in New Mutants Annual #6 (Marvel Comics, 1990). Most notable work is Meltdown (Image Comics), which received significant accolades and was named to several annual Top 10 lists for 2006 and 2007.

Since Meltdown, Schwartz has worked primarily for Aspen Comics, first on their "Shrugged" spin-off "Aspen Showcase: Ember". At the 2009 San Diego Comic-Con, Schwartz was announced as the writer of a new arc of Aspen Comics' series "Fathom", entitled "Fathom: Blue Descent". At the 2011 WonderCon, he was announced as the creator and writer of a new creator-owned series entitled "IDOLIZED", with Micah Gunnell as the artist for the series.

Schwartz also dabbled in screenwriting. Credits included the feature film Fighting Gravity (CC Films, 1997, winner of various film festival awards), and the syndicated sketch comedy TV series The Newz. In addition to writing, Schwartz has worked in various law, consulting, and executive roles, including spending 17 years, from February 2003 to February 2020, as Assistant General Counsel at The Walt Disney Company.
