= Meltdown (Image Comics) =

- Cover of the first issue

Publication information
- Publisher: Image Comics
- Format: Mini-series
- Publication date: December 2006 (issue 1) - January 2007 (issue 2)

Creative team
- Written by: David Schwartz

Meltdown is a two-part comic book mini-series published in December 2006 (issue 1) and January 2007 (issue 2) by Image Comics. Written by David Schwartz and illustrated by Sean Wang.

== Plot ==
Meltdown tells the story of Caliente, aka The Flare, a superhero with flame based powers that are killing him. He's only got 7 days left to put his life in order, and to make amends for all of his regrets. The story largely consists of flashbacks that show Caliente's trials and tribulations leading to his final days.

The series was collected into a trade paperback entitled "MELTDOWN: The Definitive Collection", which also featured 52 pages of new material.
