= Alissa Johnson =

American ski jumper (born 1987)

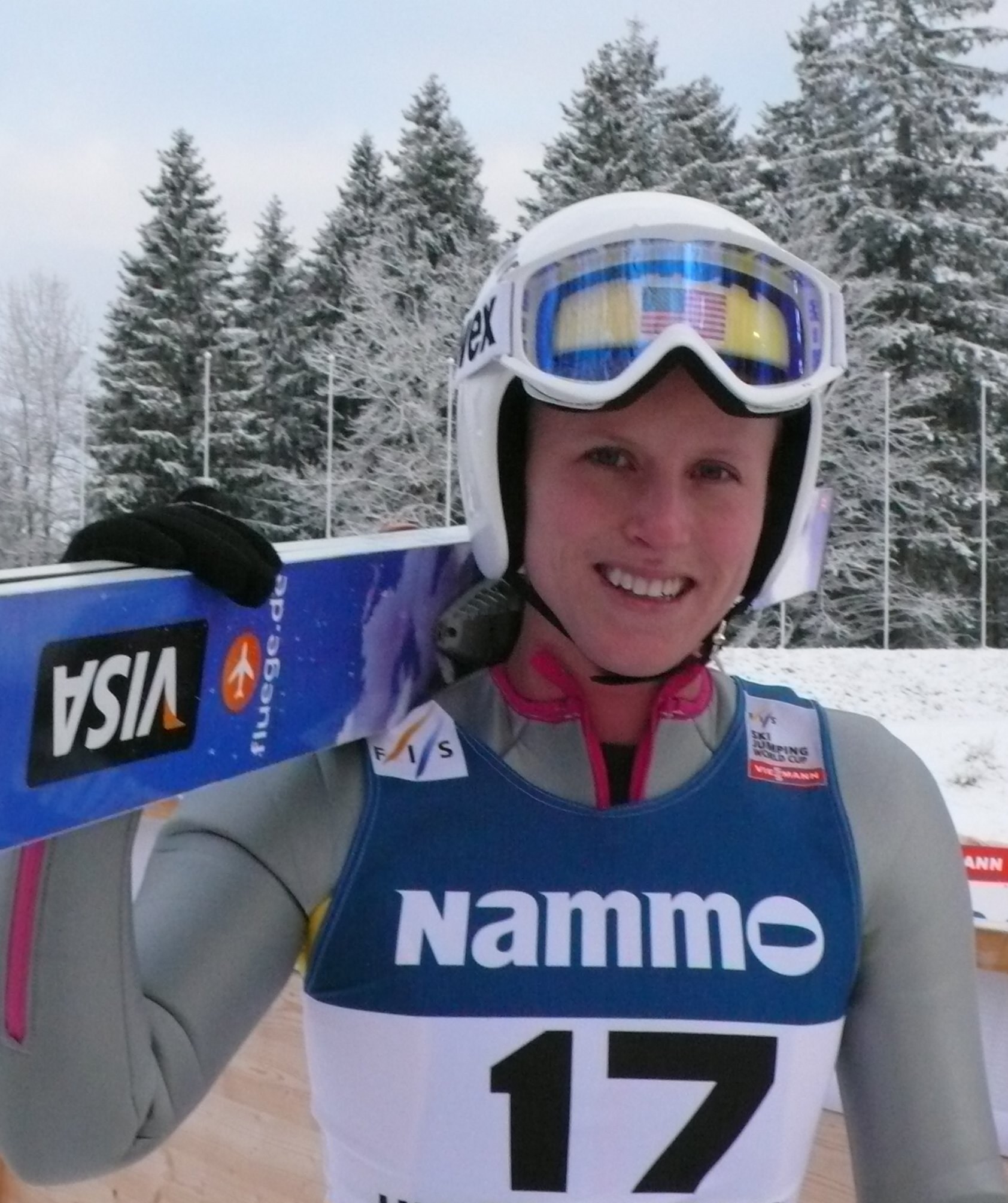
- Alissa Johnson in 2013

Personal information
- Nationality: United States
- Born: May 28, 1987 (age 39)

Sport
- Sport: Skiing

Alissa Johnson (born May 28, 1987) is an American ski jumper, who has been ranked in the top ten in the world. She was involved in the drive to add women's ski jumping to the Winter Olympics, being featured in the film Ready to Fly. Johnson attempted to qualify for the event when it was included in the programme at the 2014 Games but was not selected for the US team.

== Career ==
Alissa Johnson is the daughter of Alan Johnson, who was a ski jumper during the 1960s. Like her father, and brother Anders Johnson, Alissa became a ski jumper. Alissa completed her first ever ski jump when she was five, and also competed in swimming until the age of 14 to concentrate only on ski jumping.

Johnson had begun attending the Winter Olympics at the 2002 Games in Salt Lake City, where her father had worked for the organising committee. However, this was as a spectator, since there was no women's competition in the ski jumping. Prior to the 2010 Games in Vancouver, there was a failed legal challenge through the Canadian courts to require the Olympic committee to allow women to compete in ski jumping. This fight was featured in the Netflix film Ready to Fly. At the time, Johnson was ranked as the tenth best female skier in the world. Around the same time, the funding for women's ski jumping was cut, with Johnson resorting to crowd funding to continue competing.

When her brother competed in Turin in 2006, women's ski jumping was not introduced until the Sochi games in 2014. She found watching her brother competing at the 2006 and 2010 games "bittersweet", as at the time she was ranked higher in the world than he was. After suffering from back pain for two and a half years, Johnson underwent back surgery in 2012. The injury was not affecting her skiing, but the muscle spasms and pain was causing her difficulties travelling and sleeping. It was diagnosed as a sub-scapular bursitis, which caused her scapula to rub against her rib cage.

She was one of seven women who competed in the first US Olympic trials for women's ski jumping, while being ranked ninth in the world. Jessica Jerome took the automatic qualifying spot on the team at the trials, and Johnson was not selected for the remaining spots. As of 2015, she was unsure whether she would attempt to qualify for the 2018 Winter Olympics in Pyeongchang, South Korea.
