= Ready to Fly (film) =

2012 American documentary film

- Written by: William A. Kerig
- Produced by: Scott A. Zeller
- Starring: Lindsey Van, Jessica Jerome, Alissa Johnson, Abby Hughes, Sarah Hendrickson
- Release date: 2012
- Running time: 1h15
- Country: United States
- Language: English

Ready to fly is an American documentary by William A. Kerig following the true story of the fight of American women's ski jumping athletes Lindsey Van, the rest of her U.S. Women's Ski jumping Team members, Jessica Jerome, Alissa Johnson, Abby Hughes, Sarah Hendrickson and many other elite ski jumping athletes around the world to be part of the Olympic Winter Games. It was first screened during the 2013 Banff Mountain Film Festival.

Narration of the documentary is made by Diana Nyad, an American author, journalist, motivational speaker, and long-distance swimmer. Nyad first got national attention in 1975 when she swam around Manhattan island and in 1979 from the Bahamas to Florida. In 2013, at age 64, after many long-distance swimming exploits, she became the first person confirmed to swim from Cuba to Florida (180 km). She swam to raise funds for victims of Hurricane Sandy.

== Background ==
Women had been fighting for years to be able to compete in the Winter Olympics’ ski jumping category. Women had always been banned from competing in the Ski Jumping Olympic Competitions since it became an official Olympic Sport in the Chamonix Olympic Winter Games in 1924. The documentary states why and how the women decided to make sacrifices and were determined to be allowed to participate in the 2014 Sochi Olympic Winter Games and make their lifelong dream come true. Before they were included in the 2014 Sochi Olympic Winter Games, the female athletes from around the world could compete in national championships and the best among them had the opportunity to ski in the FIS Ski Jumping World Cup. This competition has been hosted yearly in 18 countries since 1979 and is held by the International Ski Foundation.

== Filmmakers ==
- Writer/producer/Director : William A. Kerig
- Producer: Scott A. Zeller
- Director of Photography: Peter Pilafian
- Editor: Steve Haugen
- Producer/Marketing: Whitney Childers
- 2nd Unit Director of Photography: Scott Simper
- Assistant Editor: Adam Van Wagoner
- Field Producer: Anna Bloom

== Lawsuit ==
A major part of the documentary is about the lawsuit from the ski jumping elite athletes from five different countries they intended against the International Olympic Council for their exclusion of women in the ski jumping discipline. The main goal was to participate in Vancouver's Olympic Winter Games in 2010, but it never happened.

Fighting Gravity is a 2009 documentary on a similar topic.

== Sochi Winter Olympics, the dream coming true ==
After the film was first screened in 2013, professional athletes were able to compete in the 2014 Sochi Olympic Winter Games. and the German Carina Vogt was the first woman ever to receive an Olympic gold medal in Ski Jumping.

Medalists

Event	Gold		Silver		Bronze	
Women's individual normal hill	Carina Vogt; Germany	247.4	Daniela Iraschko-Stolz; Austria	246.2	Coline Mattel; France	245.2
