= Captain Cutaneum =

Character raising awareness of skin health

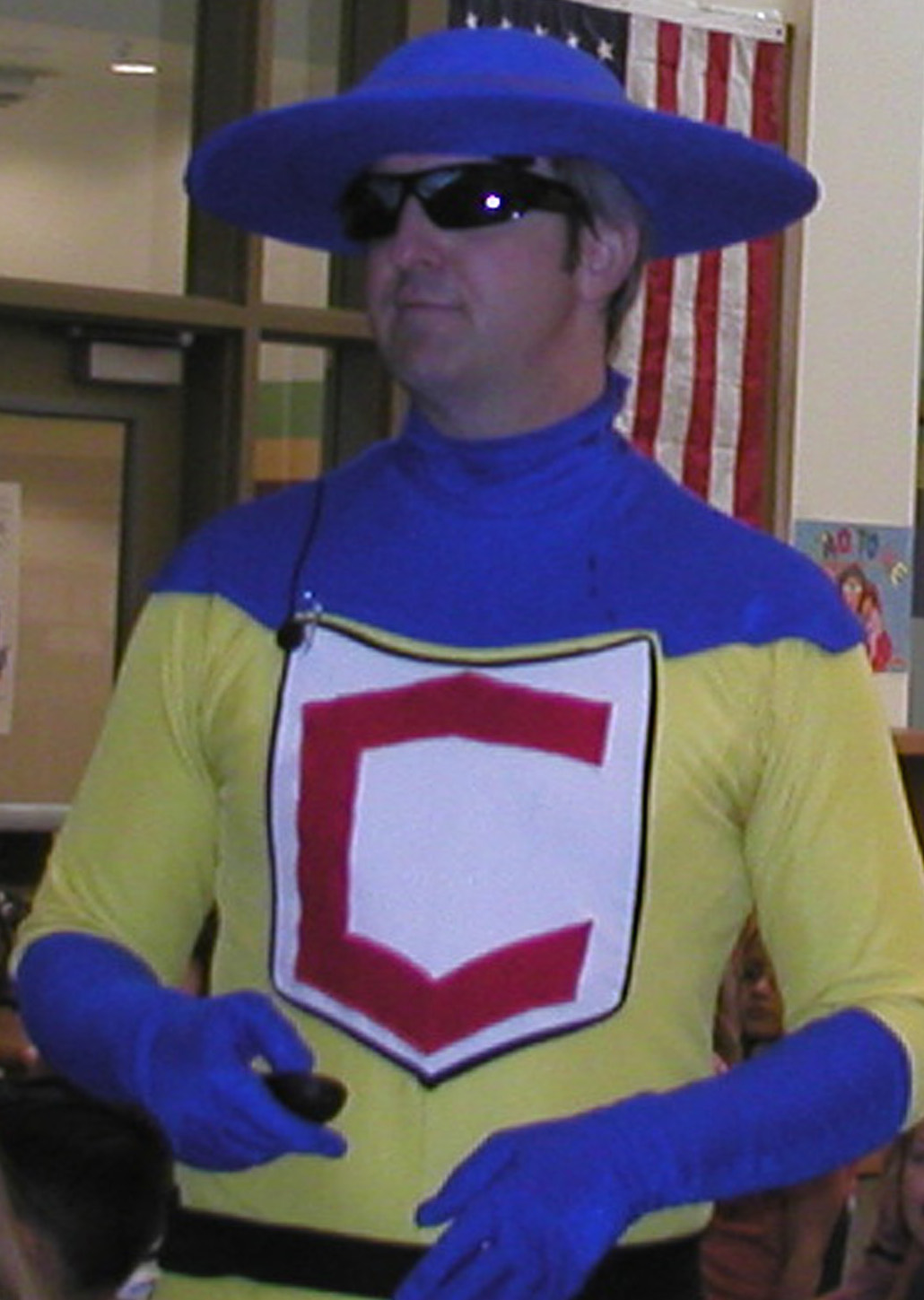
Captain Cutaneum teaches about skin cancer

Captain Cutaneum is a character-superhero created by Phoenix-area dermatopathologist Ruskin R Lines, III, M.D. in 2006. The purpose behind the character is to spread awareness among children of skin health and especially the dangers of excessive sun exposure. Dr. Lines's campaign has been mentioned in local newspapers and in the dermatology journals Skin and Allergy News and Dermatology Times.
