= Tom Hodges (comics) =

American artist (born 1972)

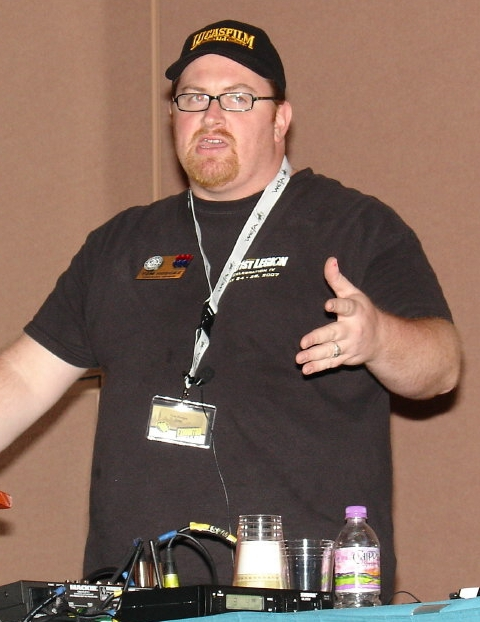
- Born: Thomas David Hodges; April 5, 1972 (age 54) Philadelphia, Pennsylvania
- Area: Artist

Thomas David Hodges (born April 5, 1972, in Philadelphia, Pennsylvania) is an American artist, who worked on many Star Wars webcomics, as well as Star Wars Insider article "The Mandalorians: People and Culture" written by Karen Traviss and notable for featuring visual reference on the first female Mandalorian. He also contributed artwork to the book You Can Draw: Star Wars published by DK Publishing.

Hodges also draws other subjects, including Captain America, Lord of the Rings, Rush, and original works. He is married to Terri Fontana-Hodges, for whom he named the character Vhonte Tervho (the first visual reference of a female Mandalorian). They have a son, Logan, for whom he named the character Drake Lo'gaan.
