= Captain Nemo (comics) =

Original English manga series

- Genre: Action/adventure, steampunk
- Author: Jason DeAngelis
- Illustrator: Aldin Viray
- Publisher: Seven Seas Entertainment
- Original run: 2006
- Volumes: 1

Captain Nemo is an Original English-language manga series written by Jason DeAngelis, with art by Aldin Viray and published by Seven Seas Entertainment. The first volume was released on March 1, 2006. Part of the manga is still online as a webmanga preview. Captain Nemo is meant to be a sequel to Jules Verne's 1870 novel Twenty Thousand Leagues Under the Seas.

== Plot ==
The year is 1893, in an alternative time-stream in which Napoleon Bonaparte defeated the Duke of Wellington at Waterloo and then founded an Imperial dynasty. Under the iron grip of Napoleon IV, France has extended its tyrannical rule throughout the world, forging a vast Empire that rivals that of Ancient Rome. Only one man stands in defiance against the Empire, roaming at will beneath the surface of the oceans: Young Captain Nemo and his ragtag crew aboard the Nautilus II. France, however, will not just sit idle as Nemo and his crew roam the seas; they want him hunted down and made an example of so that no others will oppose the French Empire. As such, the Emperor sends his Vice Minister of Security, Monsieur Bertrand Pierpont, aboard Captain Gaucher's ship Invincible to help with the hunt. However, while Captain Gaucher is sure Nemo is behind this, Monsieur Pierpont makes it clear that the official French standpoint is that Nemo is ancient history and no longer exists as he was slain and his Nautilus sunk over twenty years ago.

Soon after making this point clear to Captain Gaucher, Monsieur Pierpoint learns that his daughter Camille has stowed away aboard the ship and shows all the signs of a woman that will not be left behind. Her father is less than thrilled with this development and locks his daughter away, seeming more concerned of becoming a laughing-stock than that his daughter is now aboard and quite possibly in danger. Meanwhile, Camille is showing she is rebellious and doesn't like to be kept captive, and even seems to hint at finding the idea of Nemo interesting and possibly romantic, as she sneaked on board to watch her father capture Nemo (whom she calls a "terrible pirate").

After her being trapped in her cabin for quite some time, Captain Gaucher (who seems to have a history with Camille) frees her with the idea of her sharing a drink with her but Camille has other ideas and works out a way to be free of her cabins, something that once again her father doesn't like and that reminds him of her mother - her "willful and stubborn" streak. As the hunt continues, Monsieur Pierpoint continues to make it clear he does not believe Nemo exists and agrees with the old stories of that it is merely a sea monster attacking ships and not a miracle ship that can travel under the water.

It is after these events and a long journey from the Atlantic to the Pacific that Captain Nemo is finally found, or in reality finds the ones hunting him. He provokes and challenges Captain Gaucher to a duel, killing him via his superior agility and speed. Seeing her father's attempt to cheat and attack Nemo without warning, Camille stops her father from attacking Nemo. During the attack, Sarah Wakely, Nemo's ship's doctor, tries to hit Monsieur Pierpoint with throwing knives for his attempted attack on Nemo and instead hits Camille, who got in the way. Camille falls overboard and Nemo jumps into save her. While this rather bold and daring action seems to get a smile from his first officer, Dan Rutherford, it doesn't seem to please Sarah Wakely.

Nemo does end up saving Camille from an untimely death, and to make sure she can have her wounds treated he takes her about the Nautilus, where she wakes up as a "free prisoner". Meanwhile, back in France, Napoleon IV instructs Admiral Vincent La Rocque, his brutal leader of the Imperial navy, to hunt down and kill Nemo. La Rocque is accompanied on his ship The Horrific by Pierpoint, who has promised his daughter in marriage to La Rocque (should she still be alive).

Thus starts the tale of the new Captain Nemo and his crew aboard the Nautilus II, along with Camille Pierpoint, who seems to show signs of liking Nemo (even if she doesn't entirely like the way he views her as a work of art).

== Characters ==
- Nemo

The captain of the Nautilus II and son of the original Captain Nemo. He is calm and collected, chivalrous, fearless. Though he does have a bit of a weakness when it comes to the opposite sex, due to the fact he's had very little exposure to them at sea. Like his father before him, he has sworn never to set foot on land until every man is free from tyranny.

- Camille Pierpont

The daughter of a noble family, she is saved by Nemo after falling in the ocean when the Nautilus II attacks the ship sent to sink it. Camille might both become a member of the crew as long as she is a "prisoner" aboard the Nautilus II and also she might become a love interest for Nemo and a rival for Sarah Wakely. Though it is also possible that Sarah hitting Camille with throwing knives during their first meeting has caused the tension that now exists between the two.

- Sarah Wakely

Sarah is the ship's medic aboard the Nautilus II and a lethal shot. She is also a possible rival to Camille for Nemo's affection. However, for some reason she also ended up attacking Camille from the start with throwing knives something that obviously did not sit well with Camille. One important thing to note is that she is the daughter of the infamous killer Jack the Ripper.

- Conseil

Nemo's Butler and close friend. Conseil is very knowledgeable about sea life, and fascinated by sea life too, he is also a master chef. It is possible that he is the same Conseil from Jules Verne's novel.

- Donovan Nolan

Nemo's childhood friend and the second in command of the Nautilus II He is the First Mate.

- Dan Rutherford

Third in command of the Nautilus II. He is the Second Mate.

- Phillip Brown

Chief Engineer of the Nautilus II, he looks like a child but is a wizard with the engines and the son of the creator of the original Nautilus.

- Monsieur Bertrand Pierpont

Camille's father and Vice Minister of Security, his job is to try to prove the Nautulis doesn't exist, however now that he knows it does and that his daughter is aboard the ship, he is likely to pursue Nemo in an attempt recover his daughter. Overall Pierpont is a very dishonorable man that does little to earn the respect of anyone, including his daughter. He has great dreams of promotion and political gain, and he will do anything, even promise his own daughter's hand in marriage to the brutal Admiral La Roche, in order to achieve his goals.

- Captain Gaucher

In command of the Invincible, a ship that is sent out to hunt Nemo, in which Camille sneaks aboard. He tried to take advantage of Camille during a drunken stupor. He is killed in a duel with Nemo.

- Admiral La Rocque

A hulking, brutal giant who commands the Imperial French Navy. He has his eyes on Camille and vows to kill Nemo. His ship is the Horrific. He is not above torturing his own men to achieve his goals.

- Napoleon IV

The current despot ruler of the French Empire. His father, Napoleon III had dealt with Captain Nemo Senior and in the end, managed to slay him and sink the Nautillus I. He considers Camille's father as useful, but keeps him at arm's length, due to Bertrand's less than shining heritage and that Camille's mother was Jewish.

== Reception ==
IGN gave a positive review and said the comic has solid artwork and a great story.
