= Comics Salón =

Multi-genre convention in Slovakia

- Status: Active
- Venue: SÚZA building
- Locations: Bratislava, Slovakia
- Inaugurated: 2004
- Website: http://www.comics-salon.sk

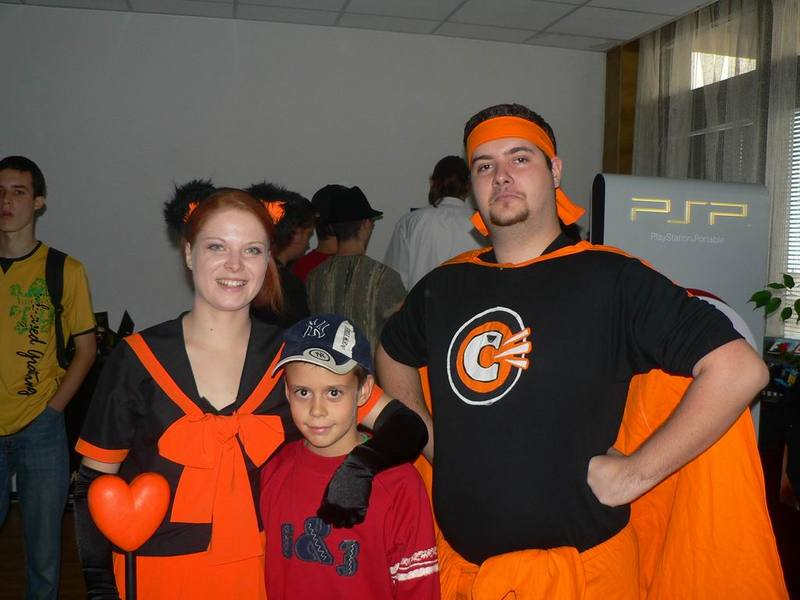
Comicsman and Mangagirl, mascots of Comics Salon 2006

Comics Salón is an international multigenre festival of Japanese culture, manga, anime, comics, games, sci-fi, fantasy and horror. It is held every year in Slovakia and is the largest convention of its kind in the country.

It is the successor of the international festival IstroCon, which focused on sci-fi, fantasy and horror films, and gaming, and which ran from 1999 to 2003.

- Comics Salón 2004 — 23 September 2004 - Pezinok, Slovakia
- Comics Salón 2005 — 14–15 October 2005 - SÚZA building, Bratislava, Slovakia
- Comics Salón 2006 — 15–17 September 2006 - SÚZA building, Bratislava, Slovakia
- Comics Salón & IstroCON 2007 — 14–16 September 2007 - SÚZA building, Bratislava, Slovakia
- Comics Salón & IstroCON 2008 — September 2008 - Bratislava, Slovakia
- Comics Salón & IstroCON 2009 — September 2009 - Bratislava, Slovakia
- Comics Salón & IstroCON 2010 — September 2010 - Bratislava, Slovakia
- Comics Salón & IstroCON 2011 — September 2011 - Bratislava, Slovakia
- Comics Salón & IstroCON 2012 — September 2012 - Bratislava, Slovakia
- Comics Salón 2013 — September 2013 - Bratislava, Slovakia
- Comics Salón 2014 — September 2014 - Bratislava, Slovakia — 12,000 attendees
- Comics Salón 2015 — 18–20 September 2015 — DK Ružinov, Bratislava, Slovakia
- Comics Salón 2016 — 16–18 September 2016 — DK Ružinov, Bratislava, Slovakia
- Comics Salón 2017 — 24-26 March 2017 — DK Ružinov, Bratislava, Slovakia
- Comics Salón 2018 — 21–23 September 2018 — DK Ružinov, Bratislava, Slovakia
- Comics Salón 2019 — 29-31 March 2019 — DK Ružinov, Bratislava, Slovakia
- Comics Salón 2020 — 27-29 March 2020 — DK Ružinov, Bratislava, Slovakia
- Comics Salón 2021 — 02-04 July 2021 — DK Ružinov, Bratislava, Slovakia
- Comics Salón 2022 — 16-19 June 2022 — DK Ružinov, Bratislava, Slovakia
