= Paul Combs =

American jazz musician, composer, writer (born 1946)

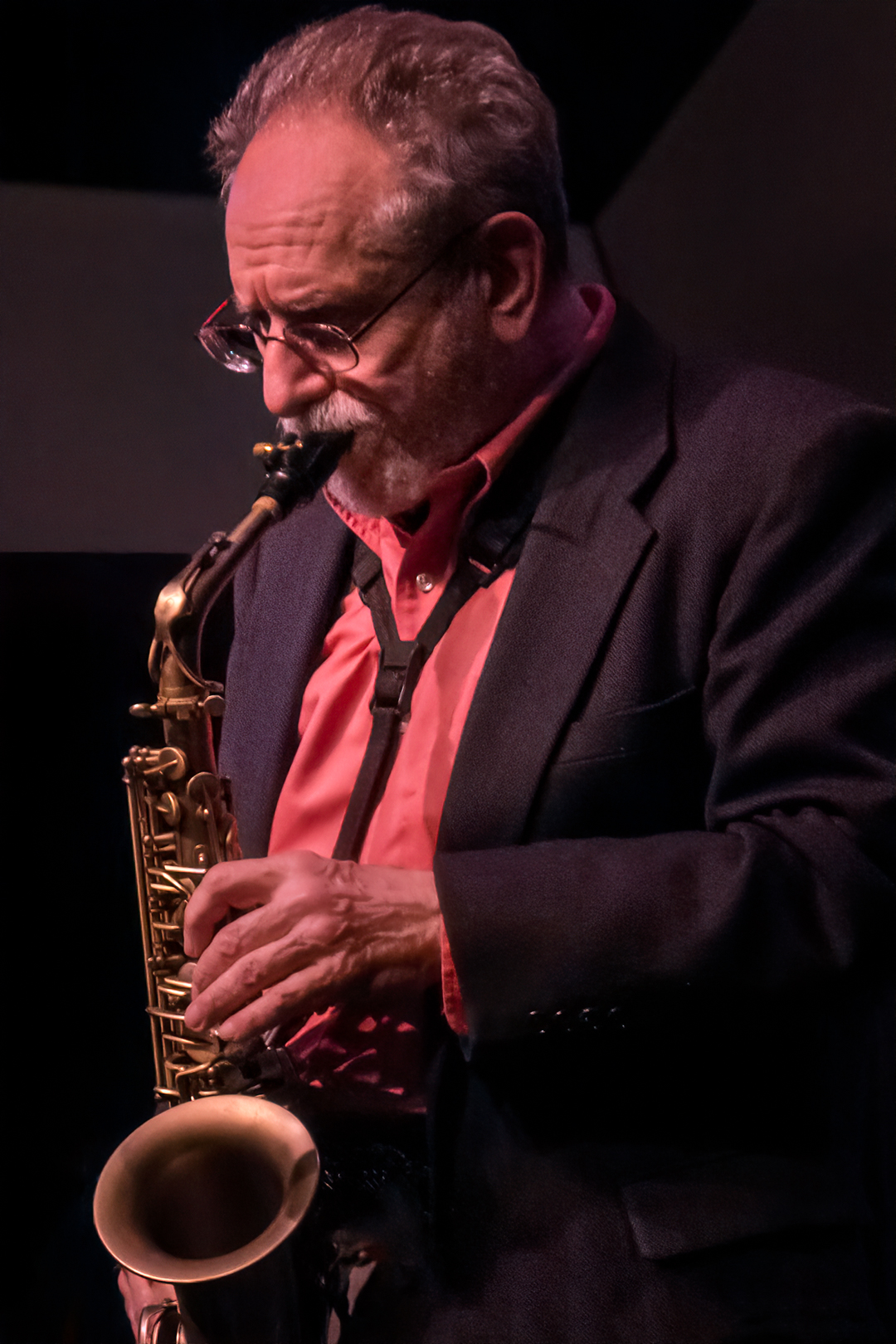
- Paul Combs (photo by Larry Redman)

Background information
- Born: Paul Combs; June 7, 1946 (age 80); St. Louis, Missouri, U.S.
- Genre: Jazz
- Occupations: Musician; bandleader; composer; writer
- Instruments: Saxophone; Flute
- Years active: 1963-present
- Website: paulcombs.com

Paul Combs (born 1946) is an American jazz musician, composer, arranger, author, and educator.

== Education and career ==
Combs’s first musical memory was of listening to Beethoven’s Sixth Symphony as a toddler. He had his first musical training in church choir, and he played trombone as a child. But jazz was his main musical inspiration: after hearing James Moody on the radio, Combs felt he had to get a saxophone. Combs began playing professionally at age 17, doubling on flute and bass.

Combs earned a Bachelor of Music degree in Composition from the Philadelphia Musical Academy, now the University of the Arts (Philadelphia) in 1968. He continued performing, and worked at WUHY-FM, now WHYY-FM, as broadcaster and producer of classical programming. He also produced concerts of folk music touring artists, later joining the folk touring circuit as singer/guitarist and backing up several folk singers and songwriters in concerts and on recordings, as guitarist and bassist. These singers included Utah Phillips, Paul Geremia, Mary McCaslin, Jim Ringer, Paul Siebel and Rosalie Sorrels.

In 1971, Combs moved to Boston, working as a broadcaster and programmer at WBUR-FM. While he was at WBUR, jazz programming was introduced at the station. Combs continued to perform locally in folk groups, but in 1974, feeling that he had gone as far as he could creatively with the folk idiom, returned to saxophone and concentrated on jazz. Combs also studied flute at this time with Sharon Zuckerman. In 1977, Combs wrote the score for the soundtrack of "David Swann: A Fantasy," an adaptation of a Nathaniel Hawthorne story. That same year, he attended the Creative Music Studio, where he studied with Karl Berger, Jimmy Giuffre, Lee Konitz, Anthony Braxton, Roscoe Mitchell, and Don Cherry.

From 1983 to 1987, Combs co-directed SeaNote Productions with composer Joel Biddle. The company wrote scores and sound tracks, and among their clients were Digital Equipment Corp., Polaroid, the National Fire Prevention Association, Marshalls, and the Philadelphia Museum of Art. Combs then attended the University of Massachusetts, Lowell, graduating in 1995 with a Master of Music degree in performance. While there, he studied the Orff Schulwerk approach to music education, which integrates music, movement, drama and speech into lessons drawn from children’s natural play for collaborative music making. From 1986 to 1999 he worked full-time in music education, and assumed several leadership positions in Massachusetts and New England music education and jazz professional organizations. As a member of the Massachusetts Music Educators Association (MMEA), Combs helped to found the state chapter of the Society for General Music in Massachusetts. He also served as two-term Chair of SGMM, and was on the Conference Committee of the All State In-Service Conference of the MMEA: he was a frequent presenter of professional development sessions at that Conference, both for SGMM and for the state unit of the International Association of Jazz Educators (now the Massachusetts Association for Jazz Education, for which Combs served as Web/Newsletter Chair. He was Jazz Education Editor of the Mass. Music News and sat on the Board of the Massachusetts Association for Jazz Education. As President of the Seacoast Jazz Society, Combs created the Society’s lecture series. He later served as lecturer on New Hampshire Humanities Council’s Humanities To Go program.

Combs relocated to San Diego, CA in 2015, where he performs regularly. Since 2016 he has served on the Governance and Professional Development Committees of the Arts Education Resource Organization (AERO) of San Diego.

== Biographer of Tadd Dameron ==
Combs is best known for his biography of jazz composer and arranger Tadd Dameron, published in 2012. Entitled Dameronia: The Life and Music of Tadd Dameron (University of Michigan Press), it is considered the only fully researched, comprehensive biography of Dameron, who wrote many compositions that became part of the jazz repertoire and was a seminal influence in the evolution of jazz. The book explains the importance of Dameron’s contributions in modernizing jazz harmony, arranging for small group settings, and mentoring the next generation of musicians. Combs was urged to write the book by Dizzy Gillespie, Charlie Rouse, and Art Blakey, and it was endorsed by Benny Golson, who wrote the foreword

== Performances of Dameron's music by Paul Combs ==
In 2017, Combs’s quintet performed a Centenntial Dameron Tribute Concert of Dameron’s music at the Smithsonian Institution. The Combs quintet also played the music of Tadd Dameron as part of the Jazz Live concert series presented by radio station KSDS-FM. Three tracks from this concert are included in the CD Unknown Dameron, which contains rare and previously unrecorded compositions by Dameron. The album was recognized by critics for its content and quality. Combs also appeared at the 2019 Tri-C Jazzfest, which celebrates the work of Cleveland's musicians.

== Discography ==
- Unknown Dameron, Summit Records DCD 749
- Paul Combs: Pocket Big Band - Live At The Chit Chat, Sea Breeze Jazz 3073
- BeBop Christmas Card, BoMuse Transcriptions BTCD 1004
- Moon & Sand, BoMuse Transcriptions BTCD 1003
- The Things You All Are, BoMuse Transcriptions BTCD 1002
- Hawk's Delight, BoMuse Transcriptions BTCD 1001
- Bob Franke: Brief Histories, Flying Fish FF70495
- Love Can't Be Bitter All The Time, Philo/Fretless 116
- Sleepy LaBeef: Electricity, Rounder 3070
- Robert Jr. Lockwood & Johnny Shines: Mr. Blues Is Back To Stay, Rounder 2026
- Mary McCaslin: Way Out West, Philo 1011
- John Michaels: Yesterdays Heroes, Raven 710032
- Musicians of Greater Newburyport: The First Grog Album, Joppa Jump 1001
- Danny Tucker: True To The Root, Twigzee Dee 1029496
