= Capitalist Piglet =

2005–2006 comic strip

Capitalist Piglet is a comic strip that appeared briefly in The Sheaf from 2005 to 2006. It is best known for a controversial instalment depicting Jesus Christ performing fellatio on a cartoon pig.

== Creation ==
The strip was a collaboration between cartoonist Mark Watson (a.k.a. Marq) and Jeff MacDonald (a.k.a. Y!ph) and appeared infrequently in The Sheaf, the University of Saskatchewan's student-run newspaper.

== Controversy ==
=== Background ===
Pages B1–B4 of the February 22, 2006 issue of The Sheaf were devoted to several lengthy opinion articles and letters addressing the Jyllands-Posten Muhammad cartoons controversy. The Sheaf editor-in-chief, Will Robbins, wrote a 1,000-word editorial prefacing the other opinions outlining the reasons behind The Sheaf's editorial decision not to publish the controversial cartoons. Robbins also indicated that the decision not to publish the cartoons was not unanimous among the editorial staff.

In response to this decision, The Sheaf news editor, Jeremy Warren, resigned from the paper. The journalistic position Robbins staked for The Sheaf was brought into question just one week later by the appearance of a controversial instalment of the Capitalist Piglet cartoon.

=== The March 2 issue ===
In the March 2, 2006 issue of The Sheaf, a two-panel instalment of the comic strip appeared in the paper's "Comics and Humour" section depicting a caricature of Jesus performing fellatio on a top-hatted, monocle-wearing pig. The second panel includes the pig saying "It's Kosher if you don't swallow."

The comic had been scanned and laid out into the newspaper's publication software by the graphics editor. The editor-in-chief reviewed the first draft of the paper and marked the Capitalist Piglet comic for deletion from the issue. It is disputed whether he also verbally instructed the graphics editor to remove it; regardless, the comic was not removed. The issue went through several more revisions before going to print without the offending comic being withdrawn. The editor-in-chief later claimed this was a mistake due in part to a staff shortage (ostensibly aggravated by the resignation of the news editor).

In a retraction published on page A2 of the March 9, 2006 issue, The Sheaf stated that Mark Watson was not an author of the March 2, 2006 Capitalist Piglet cartoon. In a letter appearing in that same issue, Watson explained that his colleague, Y!ph, added his name to the instalment "because he was using my character". In the same issue, Jeff MacDonald accepted full responsibility for authoring the comic.

=== Public reaction ===
On March 3, 2006, University of Saskatchewan President Peter MacKinnon called for an apology from The Sheaf in a university-wide email.

The Saskatoon daily newspaper, The StarPhoenix, published several stories about the incident, beginning on March 11, 2006.

Several Rawlco radio stations also picked up the story, including Saskatchewan AM talk radio stations CKOM and CJME. Morning talk show personality and former Progressive Conservative Member of Parliament John Gormley called on listeners to file a complaint with the Saskatchewan Human Rights Commission.

The comic was reported by other media, including the local CTV station. It gathered national media attention as well, and was heavily debated on many blogs, including the popular Saskatchewan blog Small Dead Animals. Canadian University Press also ran a wire story detailing the situation.

Numerous letters, both supporting and attacking The Sheaf, were published on pages A11–A15 of its subsequent March 9, 2006 issue.

=== Actions by The Sheaf ===
Shortly after the March 2 edition came out in print, the "Comics and Humour" section, including the offending comic, was removed from The Sheaf's online version.

According to Robbins' comments in a StarPhoenix article, he was invited to a Sunday meeting at The Sheaf and informed that all the other staff and editors had lost confidence in his ability to manage the paper and asked him to resign. Reluctantly, Robbins resigned. Despite many letters of support for Robbins, The Sheaf Board of Directors accepted his resignation and appointed the production manager, Liam Richards, interim editor-in-chief and primary spokesperson during the controversy. In a press release, The Sheaf Board of Directors stated that "while the board is of the view that the Capitalist Piglet comic is not consistent with The Sheaf's objectives, nor its previous editorial policy, we wish to make clear that our acceptance of his resignation was based primarily on his failure to carry out his duties diligently."
