= Zombies! Eclipse of the Undead =

Zombies! Eclipse of the Undead is a comic released by IDW Publishing in September 2006. There were four issues, and a TPB. The publisher described it as "An all-new tale of zombies and katanas", and the series exists in the same world as Zombies! Feast, another series publication from IDW.
