= Stan Hunt =

American cartoonist

Hunt in 2004

Stanley Richard Hunt (August 18, 1929 – January 4, 2006) was an American newspaper cartoonist.

Born in Williston Park, New York, Hunt served in the Korean War with the 1st Infantry Division of the U.S. Army. After the war, Hunt attended the New York School of Art. He created cartoons for various newspapers, including the New York World-Telegram and St. Petersburg Times. He was with The Pilot in North Carolina shortly before his death at age 76.

He was an editorial and sports cartoonist for The Springfield Union and The Charlotte Observer. Later he moved on to Myrtle Beach, South Carolina to work on golf magazines.

== Awards ==
Hunt was nominated for the Pulitzer Prize for Cartooning.
