= Brian Gable =

Canadian editorial cartoonist

- Born: 1949 (age 76–77) Saskatoon, Saskatchewan, Canada
- Area: Cartoonist

Brian Gable (born 1949 in Saskatoon, Saskatchewan) is a Canadian editorial cartoonist. He studied fine art at the University of Saskatchewan, subsequently studied education at the University of Toronto, and taught art at Brockville, Ontario.

Initially freelancing as a cartoonist for The Recorder and Times in Brockville in 1977, while also working as an art teacher at Thousand Islands Secondary School, he subsequently became full-time editorial cartoonist for the Regina Leader-Post in 1980, and then became the editorial cartoonist for The Globe and Mail in 1987. He won National Newspaper Awards in 1986, 1995, 2001 and 2005 for his work.

He is also the illustrator for the children's book series Words are Categorical, published by Lerner Publishing Group.
