= Fighting Gravity (film) =

- Produced by: Virginia Madsen
- Production companies: Empire 8 productions Screen Sirens
- Release date: 2009

Fighting Gravity is a documentary produced by Virginia Madsen for Empire 8 productions and Screen Sirens. The documentary screened in 2009 and followed 15 passionate women athletes' fight for their sport's inclusion in the Olympic Games. These 15 ski jumping athletes fought for their right to compete in their sport in the Vancouver Winter Olympics in 2010. Starting in the Olympics in Chamonix in 1924, the Winter Olympics have always held ski jumping competitions but restricted to men.

The documentary mainly follows the American ski jumper Lindsey Van who describes how she feels about the exclusion of women in the professional ski jumping world. The documentary follows the process of the girls' lawsuit against the International Olympic Committee for gender discrimination. Although Canadian courts ruled in June 2009 in favor of the IOC, the latter decided less than two years later to accept women in ski jumping competitions starting in 2014 at the Sochi Winter Olympics.

A documentary was produced in 2012 touching the same subject called Ready to Fly.
