= Studs Terkel Radio Archive =

The Studs Terkel Radio Archive is an archive of over 1,000 digitized audio tapes originally aired over 45 years on Studs Terkel's radio show on WFMT-FM or used in his oral history collections in the books Division Street America (1967) and Working (1974). Terkel donated a total of 5,600 tapes to the Chicago History Museum, which contracted the WFMT Radio network (formerly part of WFMT-FM), to publish the recordings online. The bulk of the tapes are digitized, and the archive distributes as many as possible online. The American public radio network NPR featured many of the tapes from the book "Working" during the week of September 25 – October 2, 2016. The Chicago History Museum is also working with the Library of Congress to make the tapes available to visitors to their buildings in Washington, DC.

== Interviews ==
External audio
- Louis Daniel Armstrong talks with Studs Terkel on WFMT; 1962/6/24, 33:43, Studs Terkel Radio Archive
- Poet Laureate Gwendolyn Brooks talks with Studs – Poetry Month; 1967, 45:01, Studs Terkel Radio Archive
- Studs Terkel's Music Interviews, includes excerpts of interviews with Bob Dylan, Janis Joplin, Oscar Petersen, and Memphis Slim. Library of Congress

Terkel's one-hour radio show aired five days a week from 1952 to 1997. Interviewees included Muhammad Ali, Saul Alinsky, Woody Allen, James Baldwin, Ronald Blythe, Gwendolyn Brooks, Carol Channing, Cesar Chavez, Jacques Cousteau, Bob Dylan, Allen Ginsberg, Mahalia Jackson, James Earl Jones, Janis Joplin, Buster Keaton, the Rev. Martin Luther King Jr., Shirley MacLaine, David Mamet, Ethel Merman, Bertrand Russell, Mort Sahl, Pete Seeger, Maurice Sendak, and Hunter S. Thompson.

The tapes include 50 programs recorded in China in 1980, as well as programs recorded in the Soviet Union, South Africa, Italy, France, the UK, and Denmark. Topics include music, civil rights, gay rights, women's rights, prison reform, and the environment.

== Creating the archive ==
Terkel donated his tapes to the Chicago History Museum where he had served as an artist-in-residence. The museum worked with the Library of Congress to digitize the tapes. A Kickstarter campaign in 2016 raised $87,152 which was used for further accessibility by creating transcripts of programs and to create a permanent website. In December 2016 the National Endowment for the Humanities gave a $400,000 grant to WFMT to digitize the tapes, post them online, and to develop related educational programs.

The collection is currently managed by Allison Schein Holmes, Director of Media Archives for WTTW/WFMT and the Studs Terkel Radio Archive. The collection is staffed by volunteers, interns, and part-time staff.
