= The Good War =

1984 book by Studs Terkel

"The Good War": An Oral History of World War II
- First edition
- Author: Studs Terkel
- Language: English
- Genre: Military history
- Publisher: Pantheon Books
- Publication date: 1984
- Publication place: United States
- Media type: Print (Paperback)
- Pages: 589
- ISBN: 0-394-53103-5
- OCLC: 10753607
- Dewey Decimal: 940.54/1273/0922 B 19
- LC Class: D811.A2 G58 1984

"The Good War": An Oral History of World War II (1984) is an oral history of World War II compiled by Studs Terkel. The work received the 1985 Pulitzer Prize for General Nonfiction.

"The Good War" consists of a series of interviews with various men and women from across the globe who directly experienced the events leading up to, including, and following the Second World War.

== Chapters ==
The book's chapters and subchapters, with the names and topics of the subjects involved, are as follows:

=== Book One ===
- "Sunday Morning"—John Garcia, Ron Veenker, Dennis Keegan, Peter Ota, Mayor Tom Bradley, Yuriko Hohri, Frank Keegan
- "A Chance Encounter"—Robert Rasmus, Richard M. (Red) Prendergast
- "Tales of the Pacific" -- E. B. (Sledgehammer) Sledge, Maurice E. (Jack) Wilson, Robert Lekachman, Peter Bezich, Anton Bilek
- "The Good Reuben James"—Bill Bailey, David Milton
- "Rosie"—Peggy Terry, Pauline Kael, Sarah Killingsworth, Evelyn Fraser, Dellie Hahne, Betty Basye Hutchinson
- "Neighborhood Boys" -- Mike Royko, Mayor Tom Bradley, Paul Pisicano, Mickey Ruiz, Jack Short, Dempsey Travis, Don McFadden, Win Stracke, Johnny DeGrazio
- "Reflections on Machismo"—John H. Abbott, Roger Tuttrup, Ted Allenby

=== Book Two ===
- "High Rank" -- Admiral Gene LaRocque, General William Buster
- "The Bombers and The Bombed" -- John Ciardi, Akira Miuri, John Kenneth Galbraith, Eddie Costello and Ursula Bender, Jean Wood
- "Growing Up: Here and There"—John Baker, Sheril Cunning, Yasuko Kurachi Dower, Galatea Berger, Werner Burkhardt, Jean Bartlett, Oleg Tsakumov, Marcel Ophuls
- "D-Day and All That"—Elliott Johnson, Joe Hanley, Charles A. Gates, Timuel Black, Rosemary Hanley, Dr. Alex Shulman, Frieda Wolf
- "Boogie Woogie Bugle Boy" -- Maxene Andrews

=== Book Three ===
- "Sudden Money"—Ray Wax, George C. Page, Lee Oremont, A Quiet Little Boom Town
- "The Big Panjandrum"—Thomas G. (Tommy the Cork) Corcoran, James Rowe, Hamilton Fish, John Kenneth Galbraith, Virginia Durr, Joe Marcus, Joseph L. Rauh Jr., W. Averell Harriman, Earl B. Dickerson
- "Flying High" -- Lowell Steward
- "Up Front with Pen, Camera, and Mike" -- John Houseman, Herman Kogan, Henry Hatfield, Alfred Duckett, Milton Caniff, Garson Kanin, Bill Mauldin, Richard Leacock, Walter Rosenblum

=== Book Four ===
- "Crime and Punishment"—Alvin (Tommy) Bridges, Joseph Small, Hans Gobler and James Sanders, Charlie Miller, Jacques Raboud, Walter and Olga Nowak, Erich Luth, Vitaly Korotich, Joseph Levine
- "A Turning Point"—Joseph Polowsky, Galina Alexeyeva, Mikhail Nikolaevich Alexeyev, Viktor Andreyevich Kondratenko, Grigori Baklanov
- "Chilly Winds" -- Telford Taylor, Eileen Barth, Arno Mayer, Anthony Scariano, Erhard Dabringhaus, Irving Goff, Milton Wolff, Hans Massaquoi
- "Is You Is or Is You Ain't My Baby?"—Philip Morrison, John H. Grove, Marnie Seymour, Bill Barney, Father George Zabelka, Hajimi Kito and Hideko Tamura (Tammy) Friedman, Victor Tolley, John Smitherman, Joseph Stasiak
- "Remembrance of Things Past"—Nancy Arnot Harjan, Paul Edwards

=== Epilogue: Boom Babies and Other New People ===
- Nora Watson, Joachim Adler and Marlene Schmidt, Steve McConnell, Debbie Cooney, George Seymour, Street-Corner Kids

== Critical reception ==
The Good War met with positive reviews upon its publication in the fall of 1984. Loudon Wainwright, writing for The New York Times, stated in a review published on October 7, 1984, "Ten, 20, 30 years from now the best witnesses to World War II will be largely gone. But Presidents honoring them will surely have access to a copy of Studs Terkel's most recent exercise in memory harvesting, The Good War. It is hard to see how any reader now or then can fail to benefit from its 600 pages." Gaddis Smith, in a capsule review in the journal Foreign Affairs, claimed, "This book sustains Studs Terkel's reputation as the nation's foremost practitioner of the difficult (although seemingly simple) art of oral history." Kirkus Reviews assessment of the book, dated October 11, 1984, included the following: "In World War II memories, Terkel has found a great, untold story--with fore-shadowings of Vietnam and aftershocks of atomic warfare."

In 1985, The Good War: An Oral History of World War Two won the Pulitzer Prize for General Nonfiction.

== Subsequent influence ==
Max Brooks has said that The Good War inspired him to write his novel World War Z. Brooks stated: "It's an oral history of World War II I read when I was a teenager, and it's sat with me ever since. When I sat down to write World War Z, I wanted it to be in the vein of an oral history."
