= Irving Goff =

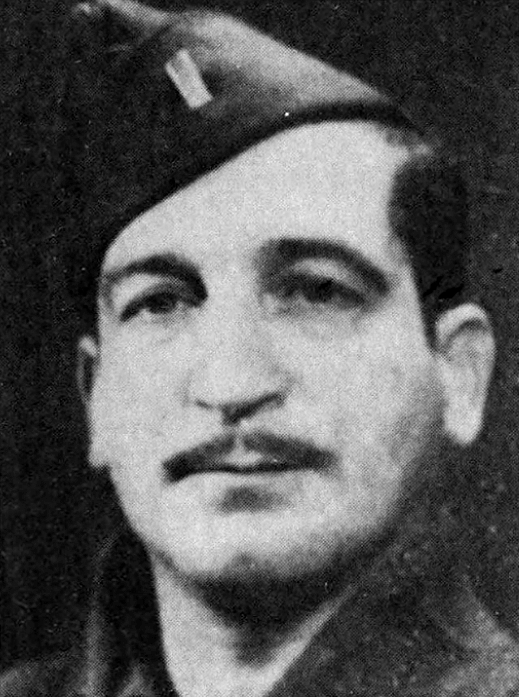
- Goff c. 1945
- Born: August 29, 1911; New York City, U.S.
- Died: May 17, 1989 (aged 77); Los Angeles, California, U.S.
- Military career
- Allegiance: Spanish Republic; United States
- Branch: International Brigades; United States Army; Office of Strategic Services
- Service years: 1937–1938; 1941–1945
- Rank: Captain; Captain
- Nickname: Irv
- Unit: The "Abraham Lincoln" XV International Brigade
- Conflicts: Spanish Civil War; Battle of Teruel; Carchuna Raid; World War II; North African campaign; Italian campaign

Irving Goff (August 29, 1911 – May 17, 1989) was a member of the Communist Party USA and the Abraham Lincoln Battalion, a unit that volunteered to fight during the Spanish Civil War for the Popular Front. During World War II, he was a member of the American Office of Strategic Services, and was instrumental in setting up guerrilla units working behind enemy lines in North Africa and Italy. His exploits as a guerrilla in Spain are considered to be the inspiration for Ernest Hemingway's novel For Whom the Bell Tolls.

== Early life ==
Irving Goff was born on August 29, 1911. His parents, of Jewish origin, emigrated from Odessa, Ukraine to New York City in 1900. He grew up in the streets of Brooklyn and Long Island. He was a premier body builder (famous as the "Adonis" of Coney Island's Muscle Beach) and worked as an adagio dancer and professional acrobat before becoming an organiser for the Communist party in New York.

== Spanish Civil War ==
Goff arrived in Spain on 4 April 1937, where he joined the International Brigades, working as a driver. In December 1937, he volunteered for dangerous guerrilla operations which frequently required him to work behind enemy lines for up to weeks at a time. Working with fellow International Brigaders Alex Kunslich and William Aalto, Goff was trained by Soviet instructors in the use of pressure-sensitive explosives to destroy railroad tracks, bridges and power lines. Goff would later recall these periods behind enemy lines:

I froze up; my mind went blank. A second or two at most, but it felt like two hours ... Your mind tells you ... you're in a dangerous position; you're encircled by the enemy, and that was an overwhelming impact on your nervous system.

One of their objectives was the destruction of the main supply bridge spanning the Albarracín River. The operation may have been the inspiration for Ernest Hemingway's novel For Whom the Bell Tolls. When the book was published in 1940, Goff was critical of the novelist's ignorance of guerrilla operations and the way in which war was treated from "a romantic adventuristic point of view rather than [as] the grim, practical war that it was". In a later interview he said:

I never saw Ingrid Bergman in all the time I was in the war. If I did, I might still be there [Laughs.] The way Gary Cooper blew that bridge - like blowing a seam in a coal mine. I've blown bridges. You put a detonator in the thing and then you'd better be twenty miles away. You went after bridges and railroads. Usually it'd last five or six days behind the lines.

At the end of 1937, Goff took part in the Battle of Teruel, working behind enemy lines again with Kunslich, Aalto and Spanish guerrillas. On 23 May 1938, Goff, took part in the successful amphibious operation at Carchuna, Motril on the southern coast of Spain, which resulted in the rescue of 300 Republican prisoners held in the Fort of Carchuna. This raid constitutes the only operation of its kind ever undertaken by the Spanish army.

In September 1938, with a Republican defeat in sight, the Abraham Lincoln Battalion was withdrawn from the front line and shortly afterwards disbanded. Irving Goff returned to the United States.

== Back in America ==
Once home, he resumed his activities in the Communist Party, and in 1940 was sent on a mission to investigate pro-fascist "synarchista" organizations in Texas, California and Mexico. Posing as a newspaper reporter, Goff filed regular reports about these groups with party leaders, but failed in his effort to link them with the right-wing group America First.

Goff continued to campaign for the Spanish cause, and in February 1941, he led 28 Lincoln veterans in a Peace Motorcade to Capitol Hill to lobby against Francoist Spain receiving Lend-Lease aid. He also served at one point as acting Secretary-Treasurer of the Veterans of the Abraham Lincoln Brigade.

== World War II ==
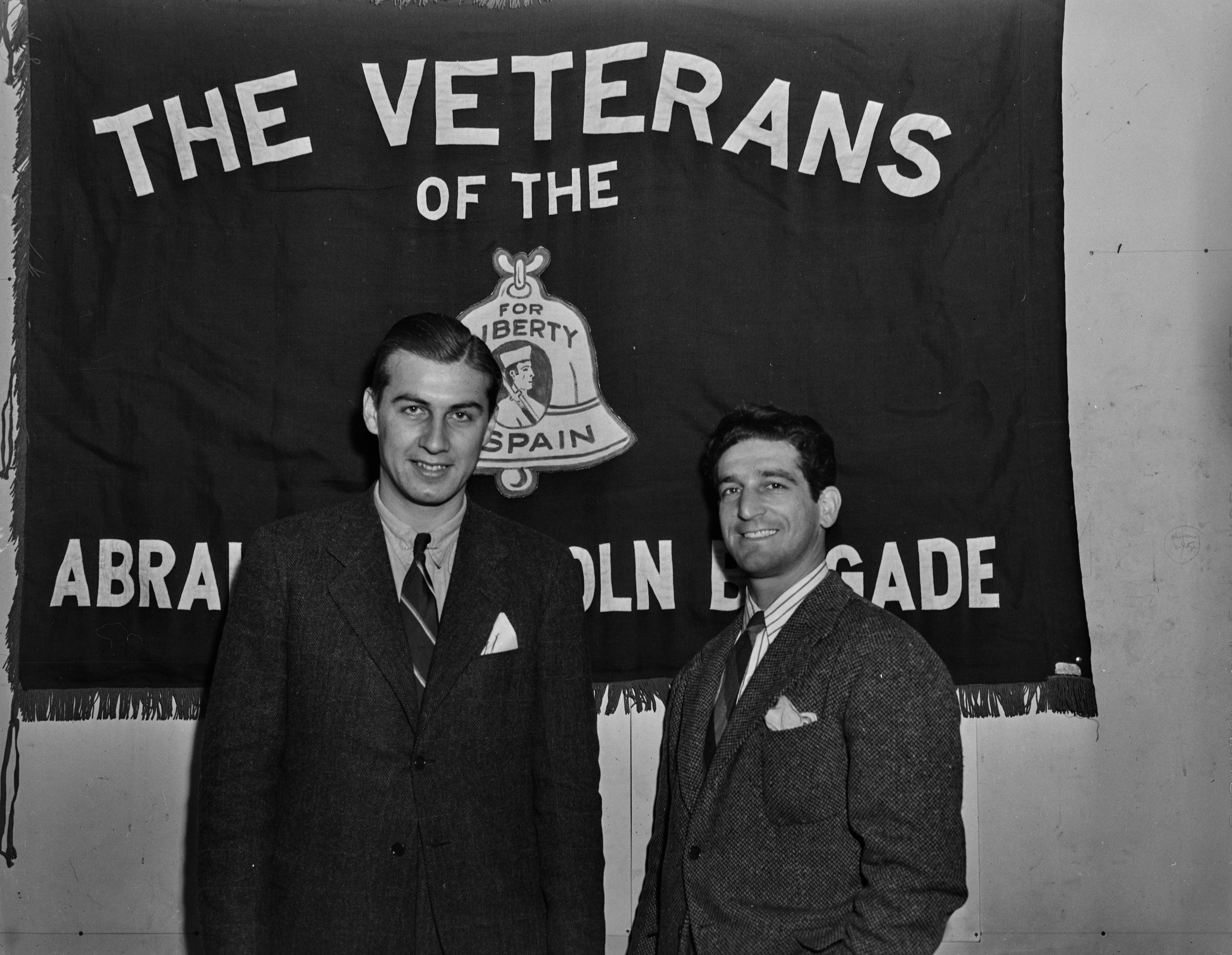
Goff (right) with fellow Lincoln Brigade veteran William Aalto c. 1939–1941

In 1941, Goff was approached by former Abraham Lincoln Battalion commander Milton Wolff to work for British intelligence through the Office of Strategic Services (OSS). On Goff's advice, Wolff invited other Lincoln veterans to participate in the group, including William Aalto, Milton Felsen, Mike Jiminez, Vince Lossowski and Alfred Tanz. After the attack on Pearl Harbor, the OSS leader General William Donovan turned the project into a wholly American operation. In 1942, Goff was transferred to North Africa, where he was put in charge of training Spanish recruits to operate behind German lines. Here, he was promoted by Donovan to second lieutenant.

After the Allied invasion of Italy in 1943, the OSS Lincolns moved to Naples, where Goff's previous experience in Spain proved a boon for American intelligence. He was appointed by the OSS as liaison officer to the Italian Communist Party, and the Americans promptly started training programmes, using Italian volunteers to wage guerrilla warfare behind the German lines in northern Italy. Goff's infiltration programs parachuted thirty teams of radio operators and meteorologists into enemy-held areas to provide daily weather reports for the Allied air forces. Working with the Italian Communists, Goff built the most effective intelligence operation in northern Italy. With multiple teams behind German lines, he could count on fourteen separate radio reports every day. "We had guerrillas operating on every highway, every railroad, every German convoy. We had identifications, the material in every car on every highway reported through the network of radios". Irving Goff was awarded for his service the Legion of Merit.(R.A.Rosenstone, Crusade of the Left. The Lincoln Battalion in the Spanish Civil War, NY:Pegasus, 1969), p. 350.

In 1945, he was one of 16 Army officers and enlisted men singled out as alleged Communists by the House Committee on Military Affairs. General "Wild Bill" Donovan came to their defense, citing their loyalty and effectiveness.

== Later life and death ==
After the war, Goff became the Communist Party's district organiser in New Orleans. During Henry A. Wallace's 1948 presidential campaign Goff encouraged black voter registration, agitated on behalf of black prisoners and jeopardized his life on several occasions by ignoring southern racial customs. Studs Terkel later interviewed Goff about his wartime experiences as part of his Pulitzer Prize-winning oral history book The Good War.

Irving Goff died on May 17, 1989 in Los Angeles, California after a longtime heart condition. He was buried in Arlington National Cemetery.

== Works ==
- Aalto, William; Goff, Irving (September 1941). "Guerrilla Warfare in USSR and Spain". Soviet Russia Today. Vol. 10, no. 5. pp. 17–20.
- Aalto, William; Goff, Irving (October 1941). "Guerrilla Warfare: Lessons in Spain". Soviet Russia Today. Vol. 10, no. 6. pp. 22–23.
