= Rex Everhart =

American actor (1920–2000)

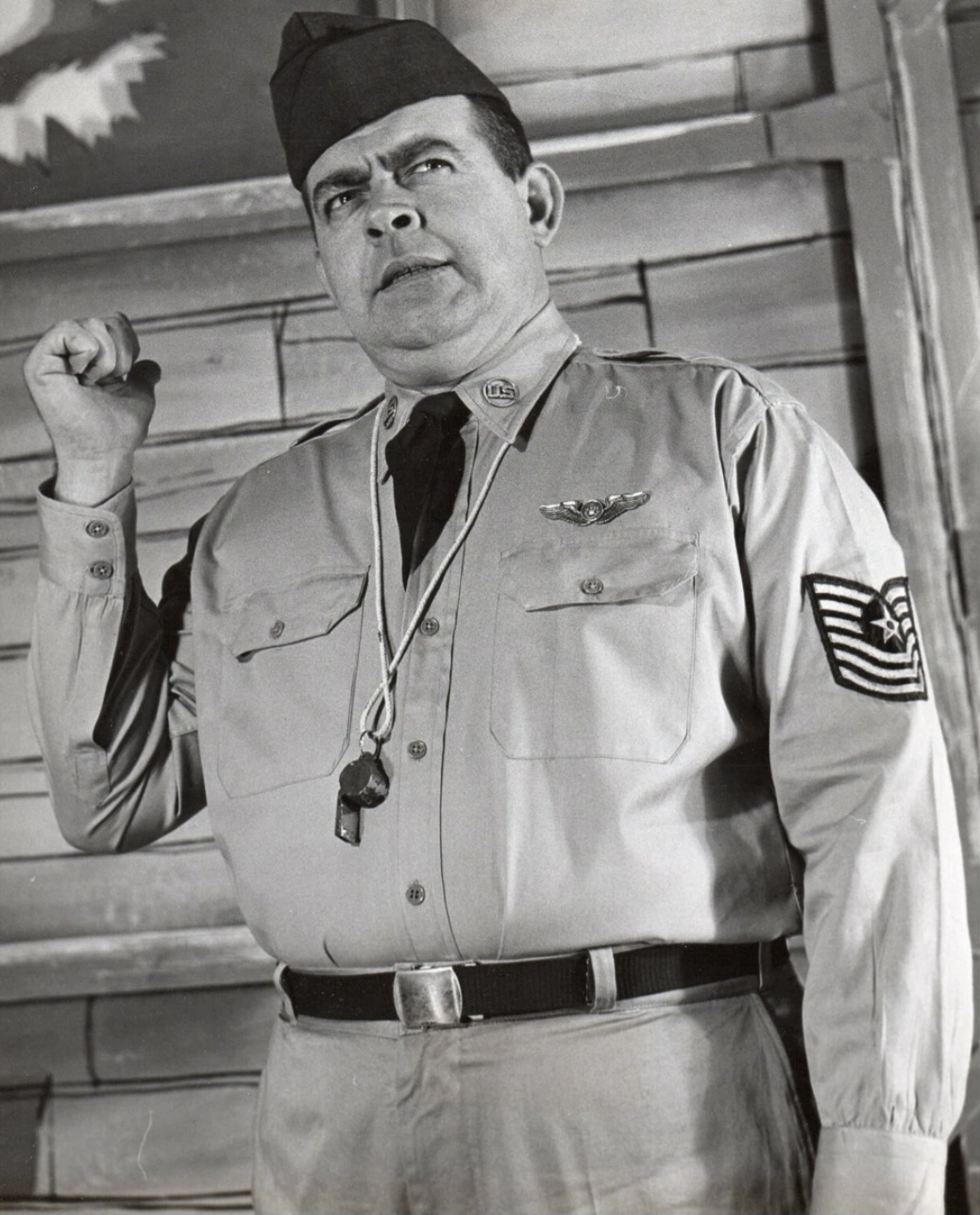
- Everhart in 1957
- Born: June 13, 1920; Watseka, Illinois, U.S.
- Died: March 13, 2000 (aged 79); Branford, Connecticut, U.S.
- Occupation: Actor
- Years active: 1939–1997
- Spouses: Jill Reardon (m. 1944; div. 1957) Claire Everhart (m. 1962)
- Children: 1

Rex Everhart (June 13, 1920 – March 13, 2000) was an American actor.

Everhart appeared in such films as Superman, in 1978. He was also known for his role as Enos the Truck-Driver in the horror film, Friday the 13th (1980). He provided the voice of Maurice, Belle's father, in the 1991 musical animated Disney film, Beauty and the Beast.

Everhart performed in numerous roles on Broadway including 1776, Chicago, Woman of the Year and the revival of Anything Goes. He was nominated for a 1978 Tony Award as Best Actor (Featured Role - Musical) for Working.

== Early life and education ==
Everhart was born on June 13, 1920, in Watseka, Illinois, to Dr. Arthur McKinley Everhart and Jeanette M. (née Dodson) Everhart. His mother died when Everhart was 15. Everhart attended Western Military Academy in 1935 and graduated in 1938. Everhart studied at the University of Missouri and received a degree in theater at the Pasadena Playhouse and a bachelor's and master's degrees at New York University. He studied acting in Manhattan with Paul Mann, Martin Ritt and Curt Conway.

== Career ==
Everhart started his theatre career in 1939, worked in regional and repertory theaters including the Phoenix Theater, Yale Repertory Theater and seven seasons at The American Shakespeare Festival in Stratford, Connecticut. Everhart also served to 1st lieutenant in the United States Navy during World War II from 1942 to 1947. He appeared in Pasadena Playhouse productions, acted and directed shows for NYU and acted at Sarah Stamms Theatre in Newport, Rhode Island, and at the Margo Jones Theatre in Dallas. Having made his 1955 Broadway debut in No Time for Sergeants, Everhart's other Broadway shows included Anything Goes, Rags and Woman of the Year. Reviewing the Shakespeare Theater's production of The Comedy of Errors in The New York Times in 1963, Howard Taubman wrote, "Rex Everhart handles the two Dromios with unfailing comic gusto." In 1969, he was the understudy to Howard Da Silva in the role of Benjamin Franklin in the musical 1776. Da Silva suffered a heart attack just before the show's opening, and Everhart took over the role until Da Silva was well enough to return. Because of Da Silva's illness, Everhart performed the role on the original Broadway cast recording (Da Silva was finally able to record the role when 1776 was filmed in 1972). When 1776 was revived on Broadway in 1997, Everhart again served as the understudy for the role of Benjamin Franklin. In 1978, Everhart was nominated for a Featured Actor Tony Award for his role in the musical, Working.

The actor's television career, which started back in days of live broadcasting, included series, plays, films, soap operas and TV commercials. During the late 1960s and early 1970s, Everhart appeared in several commercials for Snickers and Snickers Munch Peanut Brittle. Appearing in 16 feature films, Everhart gave his last film performance as the voice of Belle's father, Maurice in the Disney movie Beauty and the Beast.

== Personal life ==
Everhart married Jill Reardon on February 11, 1944. The two divorced in 1957 and had no children. In 1960, he met actress Claire Violet (née Richard), when they were appearing in the Broadway musical Tenderloin. They were married on December 21, 1962 and had a daughter named Degan, born in 1966. Everhart lived for 37 years in Westport, Connecticut.

== Death ==
Everhart died at a Branford, Connecticut, hospice of lung cancer on March 13, 2000, at age 79, three months short of his 80th birthday.

== Filmography and performances ==
=== Stage ===
Year	Title	Role	Notes
1955–1957	No Time for Sergeants	A Colonel, Lt. Abel, Sergeant King	Also was Assistant Stage Manager.
1959	Tall Story	Clark	
1959	The Moonbirds	Mr. Perisson	
1959	Lysistrata	Drunk	
1959–1960	Pictures in the Hallway	Principal	
1960	Peer Gynt	Aslak, Herr Von Eberkopf	
1960	Henry IV, Part 1	Bardolph	
1960	Henry IV, Part 2	Bardolph	
1960–1961	Tenderloin	Joe	
1963	A Rainy Day in Newark	Lionel Davis, John T. Kodiak	
1965–1966	Skyscraper	Stanley	
1967–1968	How Now, Dow Jones	Bradbury	
1969–1972	1776	Benjamin Franklin	Rex Everhart, who was Da Silva's understudy, replaced him on the original Broadway cast album after Da Silva suffered a mild heart attack, which required him to leave the show temporarily. Everhart would also play in the 1997 revival.
1973–1974	The Iceman Cometh	Pat McGloin	
1975–1977	Chicago	Amos Hart	
1978	Working	Herb Rosen, Booker Page	Nominated – Tony Award for Best Performance by a Featured Actor in a Musical
1981–1983	Woman of the Year	Maury	
1985	The Playboy of the Western World	Michael James Flaherty	
1986	Rags	"Big Tim" Sullivan	
1987–1989	Anything Goes	Elisha Whitney	

=== Film ===
Year	Title	Role	Notes
1965	Who Killed Teddy Bear?	Rude Customer	
1973	The Seven-Ups	Inspector Gilson	
1978	Matilda	ASPCA attendant #1	
1978	Superman	Desk Sergeant (Superman's 1st Night)	
1980	Friday the 13th	Enos, The Truck Driver	
1987	The Rosary Murders	Father Skiarski	
1989	Family Business	Ray Garvey	
1991	Beauty and the Beast	Maurice	Voice

=== Television ===
Year	Title	Role	Notes
1960	Sunday Showcase	Officer LeBaron	2 episodes
1961	'Way Out	Fred Tench	Episode: "The Croaker"
1961	Armstrong Circle Theatre	Martin De Vries	Episode: "Spin a Crooked Record"
1962–1965	The Defenders	Vince Fargo and Al Randall	2 episodes
1962	Naked City	Police Officer	Episode: "Today the Man Who Kills Ants Is Coming"
1962	Car 54, Where Are You?	Door Guard Police Officer	Episode: "No More Pickpockets"
1963	The DuPont Show of the Week	Charlie	Episode: "Windfall"
1965	For the People	Pete Farina	Episode: "To Prosecute All Crimes"
1966	The Trials of O'Brien	Coffee Man	Episode: "The 10-Foot, 6-Inch Pole"
1966	ABC Stage 67	Klein	Episode: "The Love Song of Barney Kempinski"
1968	Man in a Suitcase	Packard	Episode: "The Boston Square"
1974–1975	Feelin' Good	Mac	TV series
1976	Strandad	John Rados	Television film
1977	The Blue Hotel	Scully	Television film
1979	The Baby with Four Fathers	Paddy O'Brien	Television film
1980	Gnomes	Driver	Voice, Animated television film
1982	The Elephant Man	Snork	Television film
1983	Running Out	Frank	Television film
1984	ABC Afterschool Special	Captain Splasher Wilking	Episode: "Summer Switch"
1991	Law and Order	Fire Inspector	Episode: "The Torrents of Greed: Part 2"
1992	Square One Television	Blinky Isenglass	Episode: 5.35
1992	Lincoln	Additional Voices	Television film
1993	Ghostwriter	Ralph Dugan	Episode: Over a Barrel: Part 2
1997	Backyard Safari	Crinkleroot	Voice, TV series, (final role)
