= Hard Times: An Oral History of the Great Depression =

"Hard Times": An Oral History of the Great Depression
- First edition
- Author: Studs Terkel
- Language: English
- Subject: Great Depression
- Publisher: Pantheon Books
- Publication date: 1970
- Publication place: United States
- Media type: Print
- Pages: 480
- ISBN: 978-1-56584-656-2

Hard Times: An Oral History of the Great Depression (original: 1970/ latest edition: 2005) is a telling of the oral history of the Great Depression written by Studs Terkel. It is a firsthand account of people of varying socio-economic status who lived in the United States during the Great Depression.

The first edition of the book was published in 1970. The 1986 print included a new introduction by Terkel. The latest edition was published in 2005.

== Chapters ==
- Foreword, January–February 1986
- A Personal Memoir (and parenthetical comment)

=== Book One ===
- The March
- The Song
- Sgt. Pepper’s Lonely Hearts Club Band
- Hard Travelin’
- The Big Money
- Man and Boy
- God Bless’ the Child
- Bonnie Laboring Boy
- Three Strikes

=== Book Two ===
- Old Families
- Member of the Chorus
- High Life
- At the Clinic
- Sixteen Ton
- The Farmer is the Man
- Editor and Publisher

=== Book Three ===
- Concerning the New Deal
- An Unreconstructed Populist
- Peroration (Includes interview with Hamilton Fish III)
- Scarlet Banners and Novenas
- The Doctor, Huey, and Mr. Smith
- The Circuit Rider
- The Gentleman from Kansas (Interview with Alf Landon)
- A View of the Woods
- Campus Life

=== Book Four ===
- Merely Passing Through
- Three O’Clock in the Morning
- A Cable

=== Book Five ===
- The Fine and Lively Arts
- Public Servant – The City
- Evictions, Arrests, and Other Running Sores
- Honor and Humiliation
- Strive and Succeed

=== Epilogue ===
- The Raft
- A Touch of Rue

== Literary significance and reception ==
Hard Times is known for providing an equal representation of experiences across a broad spectrum of socio-economic status, interviewing famous and influential people as well as others from a range of cultural and ethnic backgrounds. It has been called "A true classic! Exceptional oral history of a wide strata of Americans caught up in the 'hard times' of the Great Depression."
