= Working (musical) =

1977 musical by Stephen Schwartz and Nina Faso

- Logo for Working
- Music: Stephen Schwartz; Craig Carnelia; Micki Grant; Mary Rodgers; James Taylor
- Lyrics: Stephen Schwartz; Craig Carnelia; Micki Grant; James Taylor; Susan Birkenhead
- Book: Stephen Schwartz; Nina Faso
- Basis: Working by Studs Terkel
- Productions: 1977 Chicago; 1978 Broadway; 1982 American Playhouse; 1999 New Haven; 2008 Sarasota; 2009 San Diego; 2011 Chicago; 2011 Los Angeles; 2017 London

Working is a musical with a book by Stephen Schwartz and Nina Faso, music by Schwartz, Craig Carnelia, Micki Grant, Mary Rodgers, and James Taylor, and lyrics by Schwartz, Carnelia, Grant, Taylor, and Susan Birkenhead.

The musical is based on the Studs Terkel book Working: People Talk About What They Do All Day and How They Feel About What They Do (1974), which has interviews with people from different regions and occupations.

== Productions ==
The musical was first staged at the Goodman Theatre in Chicago from December 1977 through February 1978.

It then was produced on Broadway at the 46th Street Theatre, opening on May 14, 1978 where it ran for 24 performances and 12 previews. It was directed by Schwartz and choreographed by Onna White, with a cast featuring Patti LuPone, Bob Gunton, Joe Mantegna, Lynne Thigpen, David Patrick Kelly, Robin Lamont, Steven Boockvor, Rex Everhart, Bobo Lewis, Lenora Nemetz, Brad Sullivan, Matt Landers, David Smyrl, Terri Treas, Matt McGrath and Arny Freeman, an actor who was interviewed in the book. Lighting design by Ken Billington.

In 1982, Schwartz and Nina Faso adapted the show for a ninety-minute telecast on the PBS series American Playhouse, directed by Schwartz and Kirk Browning and introduced by Terkel.

The musical has undergone several revisions. In March 1999, it was presented at Long Wharf Theater, New Haven, Connecticut, with direction by Christopher Ashley.

A further revised version opened at the Broadway Playhouse at Water Tower Place, Chicago, starting in February 2011 in previews through June, with direction and revisions by Gordon Greenberg. The cast features Gene Weygandt, Barbara Robertson, Emjoy Gavino, and E. Faye Butler. The production opened Off-Broadway at the 59E59 Theaters on December 12, 2012, after previews which started on December 1, 2012. Again directed by Gordon Greenberg, it won a special ensemble Drama Desk Awards the cast features Joe Cassidy, Donna Lynne Champlin, Jay Armstrong Johnson, Nehal Joshi and Kenita Miller. It had "developmental productions" directed by Gordon Greenberg at Asolo Repertory Theatre, Sarasota, Florida in May 2008 and at the Old Globe Theatre, San Diego, California, in March 2009. Schwartz revised the musical with Greenberg, which includes two new songs written by Lin-Manuel Miranda.

The show's Asian premiere was in Singapore, performed by LASALLE College of the Arts at the Creative Cube in September 2011.

The show's European premiere was in London at the Southwark Playhouse, from 2 June to 8 July 2017.

The show's Latin American premiere was in an all Spanish version in Montevideo, Uruguay at the Teatro Tablado in 2003. Directed and Choreographed by Alvaro Loureiro and Stefan Sittig.

== Synopsis ==
=== Act 1 ===
In the morning all the workers are getting ready for their jobs (All the Livelong Day). Mike Dillard, a steelworker, talks about the dangers of his job. Some people get caught in a (Traffic Jam) on the highway. Some of the cars stop at an office building where Al Calinda, a parking lot attendant is working. He parks the cars and states that he has been parking cars his whole life, and probably will for the rest of his life (Lovin Al). On top of the parking lot there is an office building. Amanda McKenny is displeased that people stereotype her with her job. She has a strained relationship with her boss, Rex Winship, who tells us he wants to be a teacher. Rose Hoffman, a teacher who has one year left until retirement, is unhappy with the changes she sees in the school system (Nobody Tells Me How). She remembers a student of hers, Babe Secoli, who is now a checker at the Treasure Island Supermarket. Babe explains that her job requires work from every part of the body (I'm Just Movin). Her bag boy, Roberto Núñez, is unhappy with the music that is playing in the market, which is the Cuban Revolution celebratory song along with the hardships of working on a farm and hopes a better day will come (Un Mejor Día Vendrá). In the neighborhood, Conrad Swibel is on his UPS delivery route, talking about the perks of his job: meeting women, and the bad parts, getting chased by dogs. After he leaves, John Rushton delivers the newspaper and tells of his dreams for the future (Neat to be a Newsboy). His mother, Kate Rushton, a housewife, who complains that people doubt her intelligence because she chooses to stay at home and look after her family (Just a Housewife). Candy Cottingham says that she needs to separate people from their jobs for her job as a political fundraiser. Grace Clements explains that she does not want to see any young people doing her job as a millworker because of the physical stress on the body (Millwork). As evening rolls in, all the workers remember their dreams of old (If I Could've Been).

=== Act 2 ===
Anthony Coelho likes his job because in a hundred years people will still see his work (The Mason). On the highway, Frank Decker and Dave are driving their truck (Brother Trucker). Frank explains that he barely sees his family because of his schedule. He makes a call and because of the signal is transferred to the operator, Heather Lamb. She, Sharon Atkins, and Enid DuBois explain that sometimes it's hard not to listen in on phone conversations. Dolores Dante loves her job and is proud to be a waitress (It's an Art). At the park Joe Zutty, a retired man, talks about his life (Joe). He spends his days as a volunteer firefighter. Tom Patrick, who also works as a firefighter, gets emotional talking about the lives he saved. Maggie Holmes talks about wanting a better life for her daughter (Cleanin' Women). Finally, Ralph Werner recounts his dream life. Mike Dillard comes back and relates how much time he has missed with his family because of work (Fathers and Sons). The ensemble boasts about their accomplishments as workers (Something to Point To).

== Musical numbers ==
Broadway Production

Act One

- “All the Livelong Day” – Company (Stephen Schwartz)
- “Lovin' Al” – Al Calinda and Ensemble (Micki Grant)
- “The Mason” – Male Soloist (Craig Carnelia)
- “Neat to Be a Newsboy” – John Rushton and Newsboys (Schwartz)
- “Nobody Tells Me How” - Rose Hoffman (Mary Rodgers & Susan Birkenhead)
- “Treasure Island Trio” – Danced by three female Dance Soloists (Michele Brourman)
- “Un Mejor Día Vendrá” – Emilio Hernández and Migrant Workers (James Taylor, Graciela Daniele & Matt Landers)
- “Just a Housewife – Kate Rushton and Housewives (Carnelia)
- “Millwork” – Female Soloist and two Male Backup Singers (Taylor)
- “Nightskate” – Danced by Marco Camerone (Brourman & Schwartz)
- “Joe” – Joe Zutty (Carnelia)
- “If I Could've Been” – Company (Grant)

Act Two

- “It's an Art” – Delores Dante and Customers (Schwartz)
- “Brother Trucker” – Dave McCormick, Frank Decker and two Male Backup Singers (Taylor)
- “Husbands and Wives” – Danced by Booker & Lucille Page, Will & JoAnn Robinson, Tim & Carla Devlin and Other Couples (Brourman)
- “Fathers and Sons” – Male Soloist (Schwartz)
- “Cleanin' Women” – Maggie Holmes (Grant)
- “Something to Point To” – Company (Carnelia)

Original Licensed Version

- “All the Livelong Day” – Company (Stephen Schwartz)
- “Traffic Jam” – Company (James Taylor)
- “Lovin' Al” – Al Calinda and Ensemble (Micki Grant)
- “Nobody Tells Me How” – Rose Hoffman (Mary Rodgers & Susan Birkenhead)
- “I'm Just Movin’” – Babe Secoli and two Other Checkers (Schwartz)
- “Un Mejor Dia Vendra” – Roberto Nunez and Migrant Workers (Taylor, Graciela Daniele & Matt Landers)
- “Just a Housewife – Kate Rushton (Craig Carnelia)
- “Millwork” – Grace Clements and Millworkers (Taylor)
- “If I Could've Been” – Company (Grant)
- “The Mason” – Male Soloist (Carnelia)
- “Brother Trucker” – Frank Decker, Dave McCormick and Truckers (Taylor)
- “It's an Art” – Delores Dante and Customers (Schwartz)
- “Joe” – Joe Zutty (Carnelia)
- “Cleanin' Women” – Maggie Holmes (Grant)
- “Fathers and Sons” – Mike Dillard (Schwartz)
- “Something to Point To” – Company (Carnelia)

2012 Revised Version

- “All the Livelong Day” – Company (Stephen Schwartz)
- “Delivery” – Freddy Rodriguez and Ensemble (Lin-Manuel Miranda)
- “Nobody Tells Me How” – Rose Hoffman (Mary Rodgers & Susan Birkenhead)
- “Brother Trucker” – Frank Decker and Ensemble (James Taylor)
- “Just a Housewife – Kate Rushton and Housewives (Craig Carnelia)
- “Millwork” – Grace Clements and Millworkers (Taylor)
- “If I Could've Been” – Company (Micki Grant)
- “The Mason” – Male Soloist (Carnelia)
- “It's an Art” – Delores Dante and Customers (Schwartz)
- “Joe” – Joe Zutty (Carnelia)
- “A Very Good Day” – Utkarsh Trajillo and Theresa Liu (Miranda)
- “Cleanin' Women” – Maggie Holmes & Cleaning Women (Grant)
- “Fathers and Sons” – Mike Dillard (Schwartz)
- “Something to Point To” – Company (Carnelia)

== Characters (in alphabetical order) ==
Between the Broadway production, the original licensed version, and the 2012 revised version, Working has featured over 50 different characters. The show is traditionally performed with extensive doubling. The Broadway production featured 17 actors (ten men and seven women), the original licensed version calls for nine actors (five men and four women), and the 2012 revised version calls for six actors (three men and three women).

Characters featured in more than one version of Working

- Sharon Atkins, receptionist
- Charlie Blossom, ex-copyboy
- Al Calinda, parking lot attendant (Not featured in the 2012 revised version)
- Grace Clements, millworker
- Anthony Coelho, stonemason (Anthony Palazzo in the Broadway production)
- Candy Cottingham, fundraiser (Not featured in the Broadway production)
- Delores Dante, waitress
- Frank Decker, interstate trucker
- Mike Dillard, ironworker (Mike LeFevre, steelworker, in the Broadway production)
- Rose Hoffman, schoolteacher
- Maggie Holmes, cleaning woman
- Heather Lamb, telephone operator (Not featured in the 2012 revised version)
- Terry Mason, flight attendant (Not featured in the original licensed version)
- Dave McCormick, interstate trucker (Not featured in the 2012 revised version)
- Amanda McKenny, project manager (Not featured in the Broadway production)
- Tom Patrick, fireman
- Kate Rushton, housewife
- Babe Secoli, supermarket checker (Not featured in the 2012 revised version)
- Conrad Swibel, UPS deliveryman (Gas meter reader in the Broadway production)
- Roberta Victor, prostitute
- Ralph Werner, salesman
- Rex Winship, corporate executive (Herb Rosen in the Broadway production)
- Joe Zutty, retired
- "The Mason" Soloist

Characters featured in the Broadway production only

- Benny Blue, bar pianist
- Marco Camerone, hockey player
- Tim Devlin, salesman
- Carla Devlin, his wife
- John Fortune, advertising copy chief
- Emilio Hernández, migrant worker
- Barbara Herrick, agency vice-president
- Bud Jonas, football coach
- Brett Meyer, box boy
- Cathleen Moran, hospital aide
- Booker Page, seaman
- Lucille Page, his wife
- Will Robinson, bus driver
- JoAnne Robinson, his wife
- John Rushton, newsboy
- Fran Swenson, hotel switchboard operator
- Jill Torrance, model
- Nora Watson, editor
- Diane Wilson, secretary

Characters featured in the original licensed version only

- Enid Dubois, telephone solicitor
- Roberto Núñez, box boy/migrant worker

Characters featured in the 2012 revised version only

- Raj Chadha, tech support
- Allen Epstein, community organizer
- Eddie Jaffe, publicist
- Theresa Liu, nanny
- Freddy Rodríguez, fast food worker
- Utkarsh Trajillo, eldercare worker

== Awards and nominations ==
=== Original Broadway production ===
Year	Award	Category	Nominee	Result
1978	Tony Award	Best Book of a Musical	Stephen Schwartz	Nominated
1978	Tony Award	Best Original Score	Stephen Schwartz, Craig Carnelia, Micki Grant, James Taylor, Mary Rodgers and Susan Birkenhead	Nominated
1978	Tony Award	Best Performance by a Featured Actor in a Musical	Steven Boockvor	Nominated
1978	Tony Award	Best Performance by a Featured Actor in a Musical	Rex Everhart	Nominated
1978	Tony Award	Best Scenic Design	David Mitchell	Nominated
1978	Tony Award	Best Lighting Design	Ken Billington	Nominated
1978	Drama Desk Award	Outstanding Musical		Nominated
1978	Drama Desk Award	Outstanding Featured Actor in a Musical	Matt Landers	Nominated
1978	Drama Desk Award	Outstanding Featured Actor in a Musical	Brad Sullivan	Nominated
1978	Drama Desk Award	Outstanding Featured Actress in a Musical	Bobo Lewis	Won
1978	Drama Desk Award	Outstanding Featured Actress in a Musical	Lenora Nemetz	Nominated
1978	Drama Desk Award	Outstanding Director of a Musical	Stephen Schwartz	Nominated
