= Emmanuel Charles McCarthy =

Melkite Catholic priest and peace activist

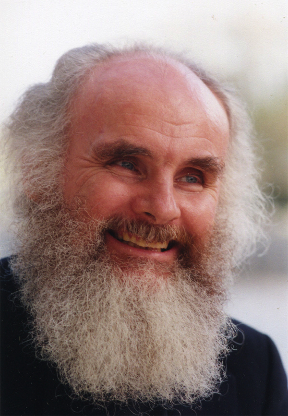
Rev. Emmanuel Charles McCarthy

Emmanuel Charles McCarthy (born October 9, 1940) is an American priest of the Melkite Catholic Church, as well as a peace activist and author.

After a career in academia at the University of Notre Dame, he was ordained on August 9, 1981, in Damascus.

== Career ==
Charles C. McCarthy was born and raised in Boston. He studied at the University of Notre Dame, and taught there until 1969. At Notre Dame, he received his baccalaureate and master's degrees; he also holds a doctorate of jurisprudence from Boston College.

In 1969, he resigned his position as director of the Center for the Study of Nonviolence at Notre Dame after the expulsion (and suspension) of ten students, who had protested against the CIA and recruiters for Dow Chemical. In 1972, still a layman, he met Father George Benedict Zabelka and beginning the latter's journey to Christian nonviolence; in 1980, an interview between the two men was published in the magazine Sojourners. He also ran for Senate in the 1972 United States Senate election in Massachusetts, focusing on participatory democracy, but did not gain the nomination of the Democratic Party.

In the early 1970s, McCarthy gave a workshop on Gospel Nonviolence in the Diocese of Lansing in which George Benedict Zabelka, the former Army chaplain who blessed atomic bombs that were dropped on Japan, was in attendance. Zabelka credits this workshop for effecting his conversion to nonviolence.

In 1981, he was ordained a priest in the Melkite Catholic Church.

In 1992, "he was nominated for the Nobel Peace Prize for his life’s work of endeavoring to bring the Nonviolent God to the Christian Churches through the Nonviolent Word of God Incarnate, the Nonviolent Jesus, and through the Churches to bring the Nonviolent God of love as revealed by Jesus to all humanity."

McCarthy has influenced others who worked for peace and nonviolence, such as G. Simon Harak, S.J., who was a founder and director of the Director of the Center for Peacemaking at Marquette University and his brother Philip J. Harak.

== Personal life ==
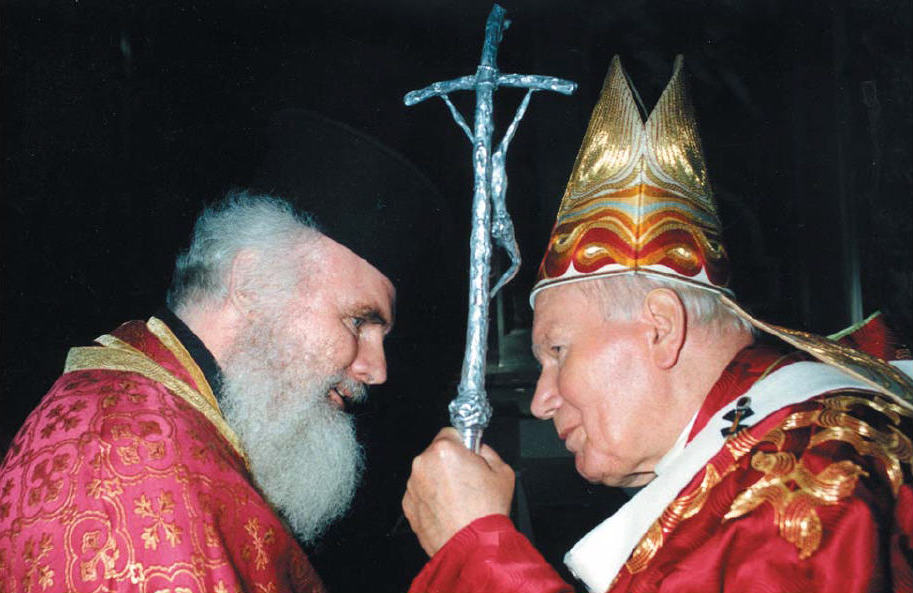
Pope John Paul II with Rev. McCarthy at the concelebration of the canonization of Edith Stein in 1998

McCarthy and his wife Mary had twelve children, including Teresia Benedicta, named after Edith Stein, also known as St. Teresia Benedicta a Cruce. In 1987, after swallowing numerous packets of acetaminophen, two-year-old Benedicta was healed of liver failure following a prayer chain to the martyr; her doctor at Massachusetts General Hospital described her recovery as "miraculous". Benedicta herself later recalled that "there was no gradual recovery". This was accepted by the Vatican as one of the requisite miracles for canonization, which occurred on October 11, 1998, with McCarthy concelebrating Mass with Pope John Paul II.

McCarthy is the father-in-law of Eli S. McCarthy, a lecturer in the program for Justice and Peace at Georgetown University.

== Bibliography ==
- All Things Flee Thee For Thou Fleest Me: A Cry to the Churches and Their Leaders to Stop Running from The Nonviolent Jesus and His Nonviolent Way [2018]
- Christian Just War Theory: The Logic of Deceit [2018]
- Stations of the Cross of Nonviolent Love
- The War in Iraq and the Requirement of Moral Certainty
- August 9

== See also ==
- Edith Stein
- List of peace activists
- Melkite Greek Catholic Eparchy of Newton: Other notable priests
