= William Aalto =

United States Army soldier (1915–1958)

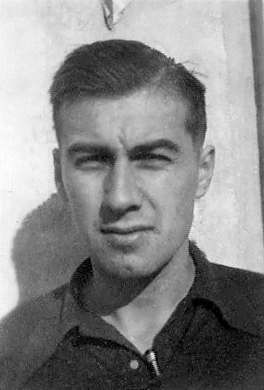
- Aalto's PCE membership card photo c. 1938
- Born: July 30, 1915; New York City, U.S.
- Died: June 11, 1958 (aged 42); New York City, U.S.
- Military career
- Allegiance: Spanish Republic; United States
- Branch: International Brigades; United States Army; Office of Strategic Services
- Service years: 1937–1938; 1941–1944
- Rank: Captain; First Sergeant
- Unit: The "Abraham Lincoln" XV International Brigade
- Conflicts: Spanish Civil War; Battle of Teruel; Carchuna Raid; World War II

William Eric Aalto (born William Oliver Ahlström, July 30, 1915 – June 11, 1958) was an American soldier and member of the communist Abraham Lincoln Battalion, a unit that volunteered to fight during the Spanish Civil War for the Popular Front.

== Early life ==
William Eric Aalto, of Finnish extraction, was born in the Bronx, New York on July 30, 1915. His mother had emigrated to the United States eight years earlier. She enrolled in the local communist party, educating her son with Marxist ideology. After leaving school, he worked as a truck driver and was a member of the Young Communist League.

== Spanish Civil War ==
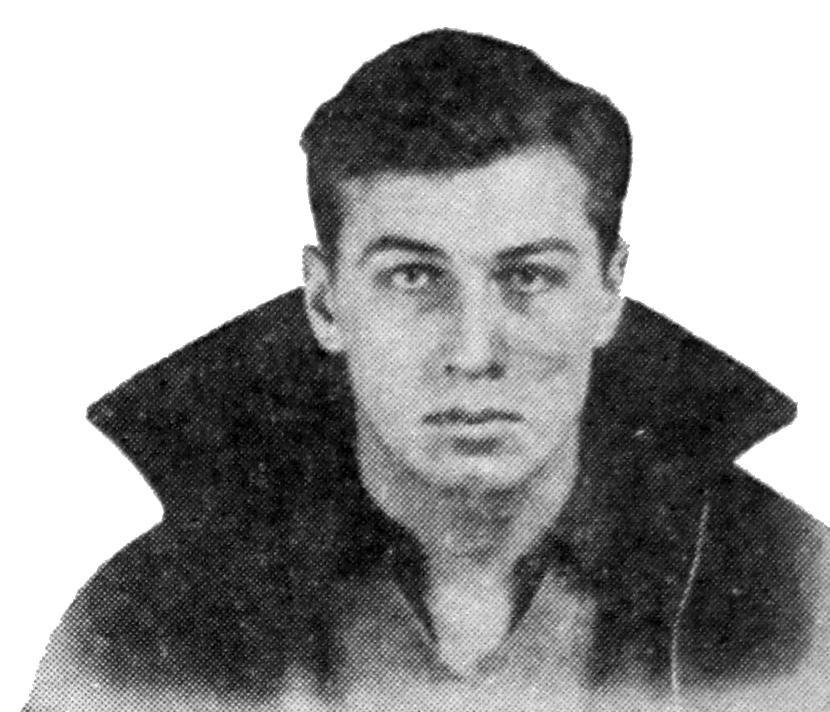
Aalto, undated

Aalto arrived in Spain on February 17, 1937, joining the other International Brigades at Albacete. In March 1937 he joined the Spanish Communist Party.

During the war, he volunteered for dangerous guerrilla operations which frequently required him to work behind enemy lines for up to weeks at a time. Working with International brigaders, Alex Kunslich and Irving Goff, Aalto was trained by Soviet instructors in the use of pressure-sensitive explosives to destroy railroad tracks, bridges and power lines. One of their objectives was the destruction of the main supply bridge spanning the Albarracín River. The operation may have been the inspiration for Ernest Hemingway's novel For Whom the Bell Tolls.

At the end of 1937, Aalto took part in the Battle of Teruel, working behind enemy lines again with Kunslich, Goff and Spanish guerrillas.

On May 23, 1938, Aalto, now a lieutenant, led the successful amphibious operation at Carchuna, Motril on the southern coast of Spain, which resulted in the rescue of 300 Republican prisoners held in the Fort of Carchuna. This raid constitutes the only operation of its kind ever undertaken by the Spanish army. He was later promoted to captain on June 5.

In September 1938, with a Republican defeat in sight, the Abraham Lincoln Battalion was withdrawn from the front line and shortly afterwards disbanded. William Aalto returned to the United States.

During his time in Spain, Aalto wrote: "A soldier who is politically conscious that he is right and who has a feeling of community with his society... will do his job well."

== Second World War ==
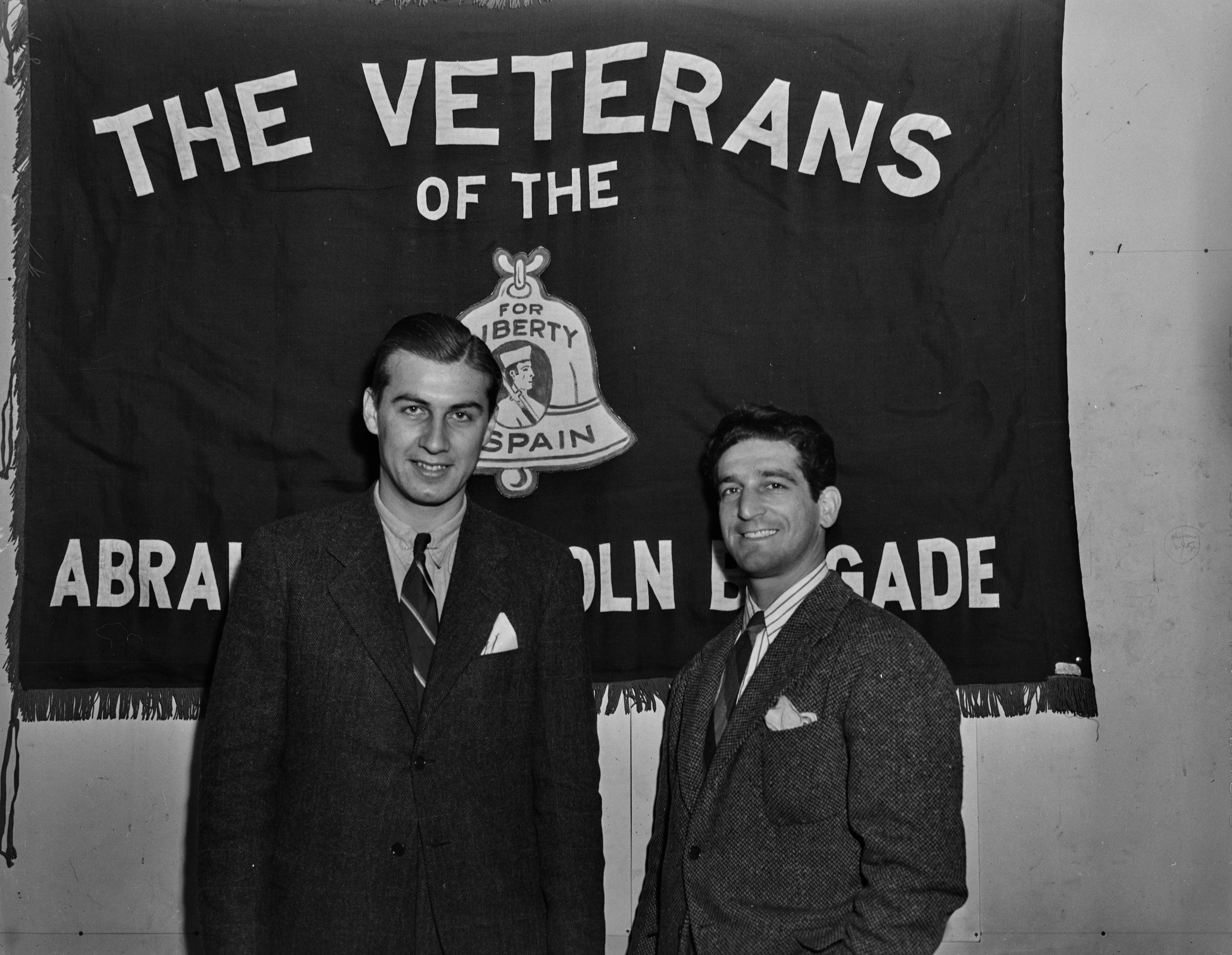
Aalto (left) with fellow Lincoln Brigade veteran Irving Goff c. 1939–1941

In 1941, Aalto's former comrade-in-arms, Irving Goff, recommended him for recruitment to the Office of Strategic Services. At this time, Aalto confessed to Goff that he was a homosexual. Goff and other OSS Lincoln veterans reported the fact to the organization's head, General William Donovan, requesting for him to be removed from their team.

In 1942, Aalto was transferred to a training camp at Camp Ritchie, Maryland. In September 1943, while training soldiers in demolition work, Aalto saw someone drop a live grenade and lunged for it. Before he could throw it away, the bomb exploded, severing his arm at the wrist.

== Post-War ==
With the help of his disability pension and the G.I. Bill, he returned to further his education, studying poetry at Columbia University. At this time, he published several pieces of his writings in the New Masses. After his betrayal by the OSS Lincoln veterans, Aalto drifted away from contact with the Veterans of the Abraham Lincoln Brigade.

Aalto then travelled to Europe, where he met the poet W.H. Auden. Though sharing the company of other poets, Aalto now wrote little and tended towards alcoholism, frequently becoming violent. Toward the end of his life, he was poet James Schuyler's lover, and features in the latter's poem Dining Out with Doug and Frank.

Aalto's association with writers Jack Kerouac and Alan Ansen is mentioned briefly in Kerouac's novel The Subterraneans, where he is called "Nick Spain": "...and Mardou with dame-like majesty all this time in the easy chair in the corner of the library (where once I'd seen the famous one-armed Nick Spain sit when Bromberg on a happier early time in the year played for us the original recording of The Rake's Progress)..."

William Aalto died of leukemia in June 1958, and was buried in Long Island National Cemetery.

== Works ==
- Aalto, William; Goff, Irving (September 1941). "Guerrilla Warfare in USSR and Spain". Soviet Russia Today. Vol. 10, no. 5. pp. 17–20.
- Aalto, William; Goff, Irving (October 1941). "Guerrilla Warfare: Lessons in Spain". Soviet Russia Today. Vol. 10, no. 6. pp. 22–23.
