= Working (Terkel book) =

1974 nonfiction book by Studs Terkel

- First edition (publ. Pantheon Books)
- Author: Studs Terkel
- Subject: Working class
- Publisher: Pantheon Books
- Publication date: 1974
- Dewey Decimal: 331.20973
- LC Class: 331.20973

Working: People Talk About What They Do All Day and How They Feel About What They Do is a 1974 nonfiction book by the oral historian and radio broadcaster Studs Terkel.

Working investigates the meaning of work for different people under different circumstances, showing it can vary in importance. The book also reflects Terkel's general idea that work can be difficult but still provides meaning for workers. It is an exploration of what makes work meaningful for people in all walks of life, from Lovin' Al the parking valet, Dolores the waitress, the fireman, to the business executive. The narrative moves through mundane details, emotional truths, and existential questioning.

== Structure ==
Following a preface, a foreword, and an introduction, the volume is divided into nine "books", each of which contains one or more subsections that provide several accounts of working people's jobs and lives. These books tie their diverse content together with themes. These themes take the form of subtitles. Some books have only one theme (the theme of Book One is "Working the Land"); others have several.

=== Book One ===
Book One contains stories by three newspaper delivery boys, a farmer, a farm worker, a farm woman, a deep miner and his wife, a strip miner, and a heavy equipment operator. Here is a sample:

"Working in the fields is not in itself a degrading job. It's hard, but if you're given regular hours, better pay, decent housing, unemployment and medical compensation, pension plans--we have a very relaxed way of living. But the growers don't recognize us as persons. That's the worst thing, the way they treat you. Like we have no brains. They have only a wallet in their head. The more you squeeze it, the more they cry out." (Roberto Acuna, farm worker)

=== Book Two ===
Book Two features narratives from a receptionist, a hotel switchboard operator, a telephone operator, a professor of communications, an airline stewardess, an airline reservationist, a model, an executive secretary, a sex worker, a writer/producer, a copy chief, two actors, a press agent, an installment dealer, and a telephone solicitor. Here is a sample:

"I never listen in on a phone conversation, but I'll tell you what. I worked for Illinois Bell, and I don't care who the operator is, the greatest thing is listening on phone calls. [Laughs] When you're not busy. At the motel, no. At Bell, I did. If you work nights and it's real quiet, I don't think there's an operator who hasn't listened in on calls. The night goes faster." (Frances Swenson, hotel switchboard operator)

=== Book Three ===
Book Three has stories by a sanitation truck driver, a garbage man, a washroom attendant, a factory mechanic, a domestic worker, a janitor, a doorman, two policemen, an industrial investigator, a photographer, and a film critic. Here is a sample:

"I worked in a white area on the West Side--briefly. Being black, in plain clothes, people might mistake me for a burglar and shoot me. It's better for me to be in a black area. Of course, people couldn't mistake me there. [Laughs] Very few black officers work in white areas. They have a few, so they can say; 'No longer are we segregated.'" (Renault Robinson, policeman)

=== Book Four ===
Book Four tells the stories of two spot-welders, a utility man, a stock chaser, a plant manager, a general foreman, a local union president, two cabdrivers, a bus driver, an interstate truckdriver, a car hiker, and a car salesman. Here is a sample:

"I stand in the same spot, about two- or three-feet area, all night. The only time a person stops is when the line stops. We do about thirty-two jobs per car, per unit. Forty-eight units an hour, eight hours a day. Thirty-two times forty-eight times eight. Figure it out. That's how many times I push the button." (Phil Stallings, spot-welder)

=== Book Five ===
Book Five narrates the tales of a barber, a hair stylist, a saleswoman, a dentist, a hotel clerk, a bar pianist, an elevator starter, an ex-salesman, a bank teller, an auditor, an organizer, an order filler in a shoe factory, a mail carrier, a gas meter reader, a supermarket box boy, a supermarket checker, a skycap, a felter in a luggage factory, a waitress, and two housewives. Here is a sample:

"You have to be terribly subservient to people. 'Ma'am, can I take your bag?' 'Can I do this?' It was a time when the grape strikers were passing out leaflets. They were very respectful. People'd come into the check stand, they'd say, 'I just bought grapes for the first time because of those idiots outside.' I had to put their grapes in the bag and thank them for coming and take them outside to the car. Being subservient made me very resentful." (Brett Hauser, supermarket box boy)

=== Book Six ===
Book Six contains the stories of a bookbinder, a pharmacist, a piano tuner, a realty broker, a yacht broker, two stockbrokers, a project coordinator, a government relations coordinator, a process clerk, and an organizer. Here is a sample:

"I only enjoy working on books that say something. I know this is an anathema to people who insist on preserving books that are only going to be on the shelves forever--or on coffee tables. Books are for people to read, and that's that. I think books are for the birds unless people read them." (Donna Murray, bookbinder)

=== Book Seven ===
Book Seven's narratives involve those of a jockey, a baseball player, a sports press agent, a tennis player, a hockey player, a football coach, a radio executive, a factory owner, a bank audit department head, an ex-boss, the ex-boss' daughter, an ex-president of a conglomerate/consultant, "Ma and Pa Courage", and three retirees. Here is a sample:

"To be a jockey you must love the horse. There's a lot of times when I lose my patience with him. There's just certain horses that annoy you. There's no two alike. They have personalities just like you and I do." (Eddie Arroyo, jockey)

=== Book Eight ===
Book Eight's stories are about a copy boy, a publisher, a proofreader, a department store manager, a jazz musician, an executive, the director of a bakery cooperative, a hospital aide, a baby nurse, a public school teacher, an alternative school teacher, an occupational therapist, a patient's representative, a practical nurse in an old people's home, a memorial counselor, and a grave digger. Here is a sample:

"I usually wear myself some black sunglasses. I never go to a funeral without sunglasses. It's a good idea because your eyes is the first thing that shows when you have a big emotion. Always these black sunglasses." (Elmer Ruiz, gravedigger)

=== Book Nine ===
Book Nine recounts the narratives of a tree nursery attendant, a carpenter/poet, an editor, an industrial designer, a nun to naprapath, an ex-salesman/ farmer, a lawyer, a librarian, a stone cutter, a service station owner, the service station's son and partner, a steelworker, the steelworker's son (a priest), an adult education teacher, a freight elevator operator, a policeman, and a fireman. Here is a sample:

"You recognize yourself as a marginal person. As a person who can give only minimal assent to anything that is going on in this society: 'I'm glad the electricity works.' That's about it. What you have to find is your own niche that will allow you to keep feeding and clothing and sheltering yourself without getting downtown. [Laughs] Because that's death. That's really where death is." (Nora Watson, editor)

== Famous names ==
Among the many who speak their minds about their work and their lives are baseball player Steve Hamilton ("To be perfectly honest with you, I'm ready to quit"), actor Rip Torn ("I don't have any contempt for people who do commercials"), football coach George Allen ("You have to put a priority on everything you do each day"), film critic Pauline Kael, and hockey player Eric Nesterenko.

== General themes ==
As the foreword to the book points out, "Mr. Terkel found, work was a search, sometimes successful, sometimes not, 'for daily meaning as well as daily bread'.... The oral histories in Working are wistful dispatches from a distant era...when management practices and computers were just beginning to transform the American workplace. In the last thirty years, productivity has soared but job satisfaction has plummeted. It is hard to read Working without wondering what has gone wrong."

== Spinoffs and adaptations ==
External videos
- Panel discussion with Paul Buhle and Harvey Pekar on Working: A Graphic Adaptation, June 6, 2009, C-SPAN

A bestseller when first published in 1974, the book also inspired the Broadway musical of the same title, and a similar book edited thirty years later by a team (mainly John Bowe, Marisa Bowe and Sabin Streeter), Gig: Americans Talk About Their Jobs.

In May 2009 Harvey Pekar's graphic novel adaptation was released by The New Press, edited by Paul Buhle, with art by Sharon Rudahl, Terry LaBan, Gary Dumm, Peter Gullerud, Pablo G. Callejo, et al.

== References in popular culture ==
In July 2009, The Second City ETC opened their 33rd revue, Studs Terkel's Not Working, honoring the writer in the year following his death. The revue, like Terkel's book, focused on the lives of ordinary people.

Singer/songwriter James Taylor wrote a song called "Millworker" which was released on his 1979 album Flag. On his 2002 DVD Pull Over, Taylor explains that a story about a woman in a shoe manufacturing plant in Massachusetts, described in the book, inspired the song.

In the television series The Facts of Life, Working is one of the books parents wanted to ban in the episode "Read No Evil".

On Sept. 5, 2019, podcast The Radio Diaries, produced by Radiotopia on PRX, released an episode called "The Working Tapes of Studs Terkel." In it, Terkel's taped interviews with working people are played and examined.

On April 27, 2023, Netflix announced a limited series titled "Working: What We Do All Day" (hosted by Barack Obama), which is inspired by this book.

== Bibliography ==
- Terkel, Studs. Working: People Talk About What They Do All Day and How They Feel About What They Do (1974) NY: Pantheon/Random House. ISBN 978-0-394-47884-5
