= George Benedict Zabelka =

Chaplain of the U.S. Army Air Force

Orders
- Ordination: June 7, 1941 by Joseph H. Albers

Personal details
- Born: May 8, 1915 St. John’s, Michigan
- Died: April 11, 1992 (aged 76) Flint, Michigan
- Buried: Crestwood Memorial Cemetery
- Denomination: Catholic
- Parents: John J. and Katarina Zabelka
- Occupation: Chaplain
- Education: Sacred Heart Minor Seminary of the Catholic Archdiocese of Detroit; Mount St. Mary’s Seminary of the West

George Benedict Zabelka (1915–1992) was a Catholic wartime chaplain of the U.S. Army Air Force. He was assigned to the 509th Composite Group, the unit which was responsible for dropping the atomic bombs on Hiroshima and Nagasaki.

Stationed on Tinian Island, his duties included saying Mass on Sunday and during the week, hearing confessions, talking with the soldiers, and other typical duties of a wartime chaplain. He later followed a theology of Gospel nonviolence.

== Early life ==
George Zabelka was born in St. John's, Michigan on May 8, 1915. His parents, John J. (1883–1957) and Katarina (Zolek, 1874–1940) Zabelka, were Moravian Catholics who immigrated to the United States before the First World War, from Austria-Hungary where his father had served in the army.

Zabelka was raised on a sixty-acre farm and attended elementary school in a one-room schoolhouse in St. John's, Michigan. Upon graduation from grammar school, he entered the Sacred Heart Minor Seminary of the Catholic Archdiocese of Detroit. He completed his high school education there, and matriculated to Mount St. Mary's Seminary of the West in Cincinnati, Ohio, where he completed his college degree and theological education.

He was ordained a Roman Catholic priest on June 7, 1941, by the Catholic Bishop of the Diocese of Lansing, Michigan, Joseph H. Albers. He celebrated his first Mass at St. Joseph's Church in St. John's Michigan. His first pastoral assignment was as assistant pastor to Fr. John Blasko at Sacred Heart Parish in Flint, Michigan. He remained there until December 1943.

== Military career ==
In December 1943, Zabelka joined the United States Army Air Corps Chaplaincy, attending Chaplaincy School at Harvard University. He served first as a chaplain at Wright Field, a United States Army Air Corps airfield in Riverside, Ohio. His requests for combat chaplaincy service resulted in his being assigned to the 309th General Hospital Unit on Tinian Island in the Marianas in August 1945. The 509th Composite Group, which included the atomic bomb crews, also arrived in 1945 on Tinian Island in preparation for the bombing of Japan. For security reasons, they were sealed off from all other military personnel and operations on the island. The 509th had a Protestant chaplain but no Catholic chaplain. Zabelka was formally assigned by his military superiors to serve as its Catholic chaplain through August 1945.

In September 1945 he was transferred to mainland Japan where he served in the Occupation Forces from September 1945 to November 1946. He was first stationed on the southern part of the island of Honshu, then in Tokyo, and finally at Yamagata. During this time he earned his paratrooper's wings. Zabelka was not only a Catholic military chaplain but was known to be “all soldier” and once received a military reprimand for “excessive zeal.”

== Return to parish life ==
Zabelka was discharged from the military at Fort Lewis, Washington, in December 1946 with the rank of major. He returned to the Diocese of Lansing and was assigned as a parish priest to St. Thomas Aquinas Parish, where he was the moderator of the Newman Center at Michigan State University and was the Catholic chaplain for the Boys Vocational School in Lansing.

During this time he joined the Michigan National Guard and was assigned as Catholic Chaplain to the 125th Infantry Regiment. He stayed in the National Guard for twenty years, retiring as a lieutenant colonel.

In 1955 Fr. Zabelka was transferred back to Sacred Heart Parish in Flint, Michigan, with notification from the Bishop that the parish would soon close. He fought successfully to keep the church and parochial school open for black children, despite major objections from a variety of sources and an ongoing struggle over finances.

He and his parishioners started “Heart of the City” in Flint. The goal of the project was to train young black people for employment and to offer them counseling and other social services, including sometimes food if there was a need. He preached against racism, during a time when racial antagonism and enmity often erupted into violence. He participated in the Poor People's March on Washington and stayed in Resurrection City.

In 1968, with riots erupting all over the U.S., including in Detroit, in response to the assassination of Martin Luther King Jr., Zabelka was the only white person able to walk the streets of Flint, in the company of young black men and women who were trying to prevent Flint from turning into Detroit. During these years he also founded “Focus on Progress", a program to help students who were having academic difficulties in school to upgrade their learning skills. In the African-American community of Flint, it was said that, “Fr. George is a real civil rights man.”

In 1969, he suffered a heart attack. In 1971, following his recovery, he was transferred to a smaller parish, St. James, in Mason, Michigan. During this time, motivated by his lifelong devotion to the Blessed Mother and the Rosary, he became a Tertiary Dominican, an order uniquely related to the Rosary and its history. He took the name of Brother Thomas.

== Conversion to Gospel Nonviolence ==
In 1973, Zabelka attended a three-day workshop given by his Diocese for the priests of his Diocese on Gospel Nonviolence directed by a layman, Emmanuel Charles McCarthy. In the following two years, he attended the same workshop on two other occasions in different locations. Then, in his 1975 Christmas letter to his friends, he wrote this: “I do not want to lose any of you as my friends and I certainly do not want to offend any of you, but I must do an about-face. I have attended this workshop on Christian Nonviolence several times and have read the books that were recommended at it. I have come to the conclusion that the truth of the Gospel is that Jesus was nonviolent and taught nonviolence as His way.”

In February 1976, he retired from the life of an active parish priest and dedicated the remainder of his life to teaching the centrality of the nonviolent Jesus Christ of the Gospels, as well as Jesus’ Way of nonviolent love of friends and enemies, for peace of soul, for peace among people and for the eternal salvation of all. He asserted that all the Churches of Christianity (Catholic, Protestant and Orthodox), regardless of the rank each held in his or her Church, must begin to (or return to) following the Nonviolent Jesus of the Gospels and His Way of Nonviolent Love for all, under all circumstances. He stated that, "Until the various churches within Christianity repent and began to proclaim by word and deed what Jesus preached with relation to violence and enemies; there is not hope for anything other than escalating violence and destruction.”

His conversion may have started just months after the dropping of the atomic bombs. He stated;

"Three of us chaplains took a trip to Nagasaki to see [the results of] the bombing. There were no restrictions of any kind. So we went to the nearest place where there were still the survivors. And this I think is what really got me started on even a beginning of a new way of thinking on this. Because, here were little children that were horribly burned and suffering and dying. By that time there were nurses and doctors taking care of them, because this was two or three months afterwards. But this was the beginning of a whole new kind of worm squirming in my stomach that something was wrong. These little children had nothing to do with the war. Why were they suffering?" - This quote can be found between 25:40 and 26:17 of The Reluctant Prophet DVD.

== “I was brainwashed. They told me it was necessary.” ==
In August 1980 Sojourners magazine published an extensive interview with Zabelka, titled “I was brainwashed. They told me it was necessary.” In the interview, he described the process of his conversion from a hard-core belief in the moral validity of Christian Just war theory as a viable moral option for a disciple of Jesus to instead making a full-fledged and public commitment to the nonviolent Jesus of the Gospels. The interview was picked up and published in religious and non-religious journals and books throughout the world. Its considerable influence was immediate, and it extends to this day.

One example of this influence is found in ”The Bishops and the Bomb”, James Castelli's history of the U.S. Catholic Bishops’ Conference's famous war-peace pastoral, The Challenge of Peace. Writing about Bishop Frank Murphy, the sole initiator of the document that became The Challenge of Peace, and what influenced him to make this proposal to the U.S. Bishops, Castelli says, "But the major influence on Murphy may have been Father George Zabelka, a Catholic priest, who as an Air Force chaplain had blessed the men who dropped the atomic bombs on Hiroshima and Nagasaki, just as he had previously blessed the men who were inflicting massive bombing damage on the civilians of Tokyo. Murphy quoted from an interview with Zabelka in the evangelical Christian magazine, SOJOURNERS” (August, 1980), ”Fr. Zabelka: “I was brainwashed! It never entered my mind to publicly protest the consequences of these massive air raids. I was told the raids were necessary; told openly by the military and told implicitly by my Church's leadership. To the best of my knowledge no American cardinals or bishops were opposing these mass air raids. Silence in such matters, especially by a public body like the American bishops, is a stamp of approval.”” ”.

As a tribute to Zabelka's courage in admitting that he had made a grave moral mistake by his silence during the atomic bombings, Australian folk singer, Peter Kearney wrote and recorded a ballad titled, “My Name is George Zabelka” heard by tens of millions across the world, although it was never played on the secular or religious radio stations and networks in the United States.

In 1988, a full-length documentary telling the story of Zabelka's life and conversion was released in Great Britain. The Reluctant Prophet” has been viewed worldwide and is used, to this day, in the religious education classes of many local churches as well as in local peace and justice programs. To this day, however, it has not ever been shown on U.S. public or private secular television, nor on U.S. Christian television networks.

In his homily at a 1991 Mass celebrating the fiftieth anniversary of his ordination to the Catholic priesthood, Fr. Zabelka said, “I looked in the Catholic Bible. I looked in the Protestant Bible. I looked in the Orthodox Bible. And, in every one of them, there it was in no uncertain terms. Jesus saying, ‘Love your enemies.’”.

== Pilgrimages ==
Also as a consequence of that article, Zabelka and a Jesuit priest, Jack Morris, planned, organized, and participated in the Bethlehem Peace Pilgrimage. This was a 7,500-mile (4,000 in the U.S., 3,500 in Europe) two-year walk on behalf of bringing God's peace to humanity. It began in 1983, when walkers left the nuclear submarine base in Bangor, Washington, and it ended on Christmas Eve in 1984 in Bethlehem. Zabelka was 67 when he began this pilgrimage.

In 1985, Fr. George Zabelka made a pilgrimage from Hiroshima to Nagasaki on the fortieth anniversary of the atomic bombings of those Japanese cities, as a way of asking those harmed by the bombings for forgiveness for himself and for his Church, "for bringing you death instead of the fullness of life, misery instead of mercy.".

== Death ==
Zabelka died in Flint, Michigan, on April 11, 1992.

He was buried on April 15, 1992, from Sacred Heart Church in Flint, in a funeral liturgy and Mass of the Resurrection. The Bishop of the diocese, Kenneth Povich, presided at the Mass, which was concelebrated by other bishops and many priests, with a congregation that greatly overflowed the capacity of the church. In his homily, Bishop Povish commented: “In our priestly gatherings, when we would concelebrate Mass together, at the prayers of petition Fr. George would always have us pray for our enemies.”.

As he requested, Zabelka's body is buried in the veterans’ section, Wing Victory II, at Crestwood Memorial Cemetery in Grand Blanc, Michigan.
