= Studs Terkel =

American author, historian and broadcaster (1912–2008)

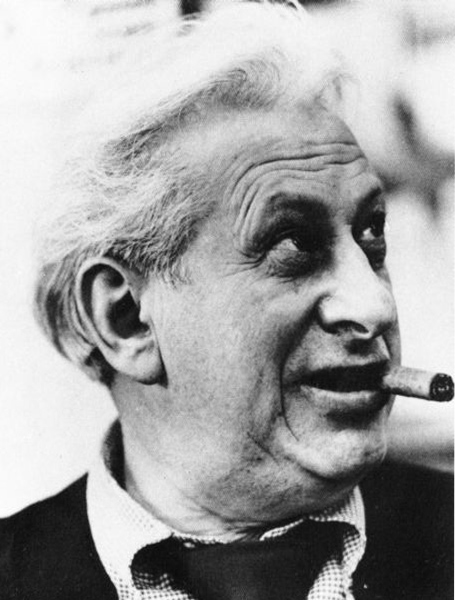
- Terkel in 1979
- Born: Louis Terkel; May 16, 1912; New York City, U.S.
- Died: October 31, 2008 (aged 96); Chicago, Illinois, U.S.
- Education: University of Chicago (PhB, JD)
- Occupations: Author; historian; radio personality; actor
- Spouse: Ida Goldberg (m. 1939; died 1999)
- Children: 1
- Writing career
- Pen name: Studs Terkel
- Years active: 1934–2008
- Notable awards: Pulitzer Prize for General Nonfiction, 1985
- Website: studsterkel.org

Louis "Studs" Terkel (May 16, 1912 – October 31, 2008) was an American writer, historian, actor and broadcaster. He received the Pulitzer Prize for General Nonfiction in 1985 for The Good War and is best remembered for his oral histories of common Americans, and for hosting a long-running radio show in Chicago.

== Early life ==
Terkel was born to Russian Jewish immigrants, Samuel Terkel, a tailor, and Anna (Annie) Finkel, a seamstress, in New York City. At the age of eight, he moved with his family to Chicago, Illinois, where he spent most of his life. He had two brothers, Meyer (1905–1958) and Ben (1907–1965). He attended McKinley High School.

From 1926 to 1936, his parents ran a rooming house called the Wells-Grand Hotel that also served as a meeting place for people from all walks of life. Terkel credited his understanding of humanity and social interaction to the tenants and visitors who gathered in the lobby there and the people who congregated in nearby Bughouse Square.

In 1939, he married Ida Goldberg (1912–1999), and the couple had one son. Although he received his undergraduate degree in 1932 and a J.D. degree from the University of Chicago in 1934 (and was admitted to the Illinois Bar the following year), he decided that, instead of practicing law, he wanted to be a concierge at a hotel, and he soon joined a theater group.

== Career ==
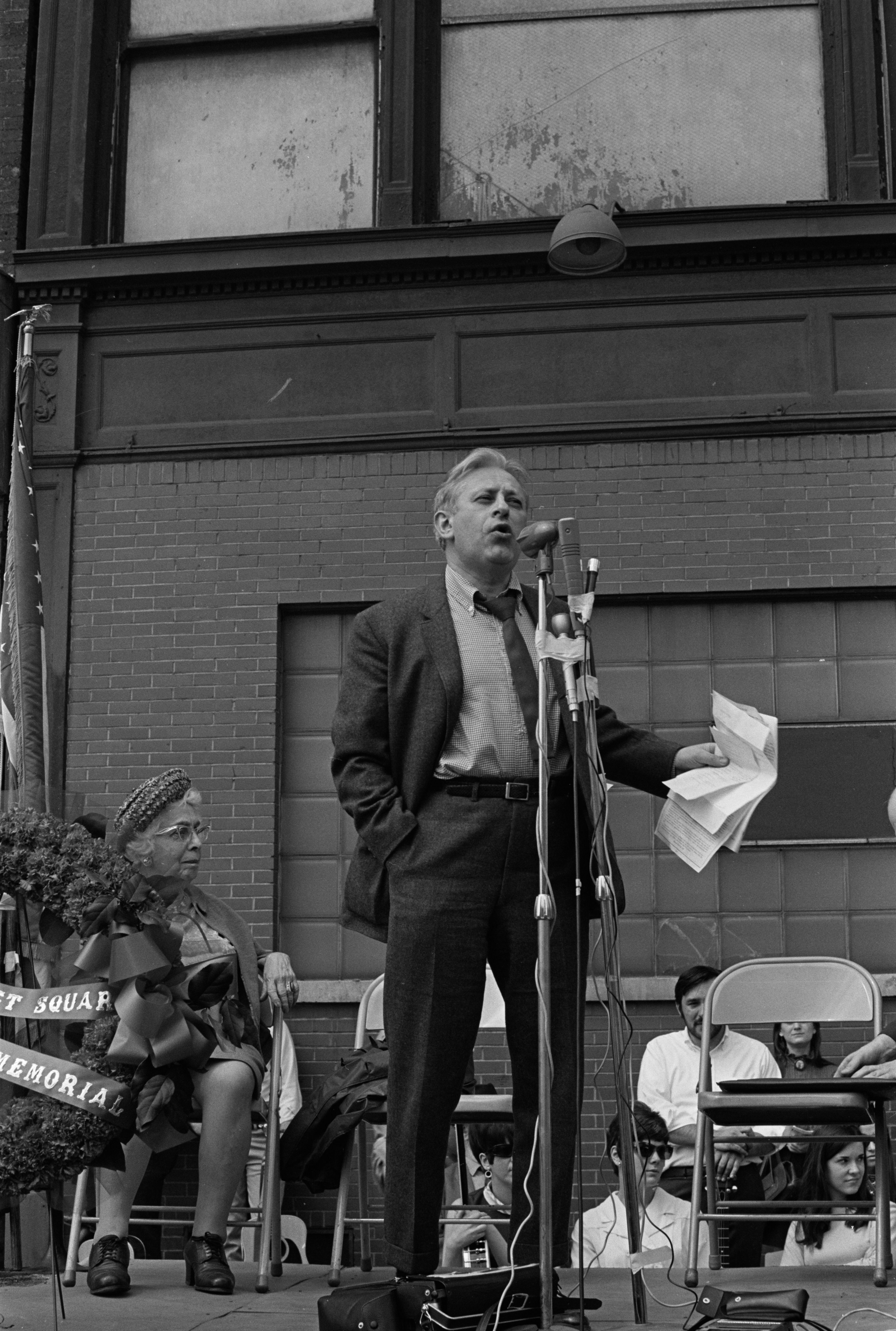
Terkel at a May Day memorial for the Haymarket martyrs in Chicago, May 1, 1969

A political leftist, Terkel joined the Works Progress Administration's Federal Writers' Project, working in radio, doing work that varied from voicing soap opera productions and announcing news and sports to presenting shows of recorded music and writing radio scripts and advertisements. In the late 1940s he voiced characters in WMAQ's Destination Freedom series, written by Richard Durham. His own well-known radio program, titled The Studs Terkel Program, aired on 98.7 WFMT Chicago between 1952 and 1997. The one-hour program was broadcast each weekday during those 45 years. On this program, he interviewed guests as diverse as Martin Luther King Jr., Leonard Bernstein, Mort Sahl, Bob Dylan, Alexander Frey, Dorothy Parker, Tennessee Williams, Jean Shepherd, Alan Watts, Frank Zappa, and Big Bill Broonzy.

In the late 1940s and early 1950s, Terkel was also the central character of Studs' Place, an unscripted television drama about the owner of a greasy-spoon diner in Chicago through which many famous people and interesting characters passed. This show, Marlin Perkins's Zoo Parade, Garroway at Large, and the children's show Kukla, Fran, and Ollie are widely considered canonical examples of the Chicago School of Television.

Terkel published his first book, Giants of Jazz, in 1956. He followed it in 1967 with his first collection of oral histories, Division Street: America, with 70 people talking about the effect on the human spirit of living in an American metropolis.

He also served as a distinguished scholar-in-residence at the Chicago History Museum. He appeared in the film Eight Men Out, based on the Black Sox Scandal, in which he played newspaper reporter Hugh Fullerton, who tries to uncover the White Sox players' plans to throw the 1919 World Series. Terkel found it particularly amusing to play this role, as he was a big fan of the Chicago White Sox (as well as a vocal critic of major league baseball during the 1994 baseball strike), and gave a moving congratulatory speech to the White Sox organization after their 2005 World Series championship during a television interview.

Terkel received his nickname while he was acting in a play with another person named Louis. To keep the two straight, the director of the production gave Terkel the nickname Studs after the fictional character about whom Terkel was reading at the time—Studs Lonigan, of James T. Farrell's trilogy.

Terkel was acclaimed for his efforts to preserve American oral history. His 1985 book "The Good War": An Oral History of World War Two, which detailed ordinary peoples' accounts of the country's involvement in World War II, won the Pulitzer Prize. For Hard Times: An Oral History of the Great Depression, Terkel assembled recollections of the Great Depression that spanned the socioeconomic spectrum, from Okies, through prison inmates, to the wealthy. His 1974 book, Working, in which (as reflected by its subtitle) People Talk About What They Do All Day and How They Feel About What They Do, also was highly acclaimed. Working was made into a short-lived Broadway show of the same title in 1978 and was telecast on PBS in 1982. In 1995, he received the Chicago History Museum "Making History Award" for Distinction in Journalism and Communications. In 1997, Terkel was elected a member of The American Academy of Arts and Letters. Two years later, he received the George Polk Career Award in 1999.

== Later life ==
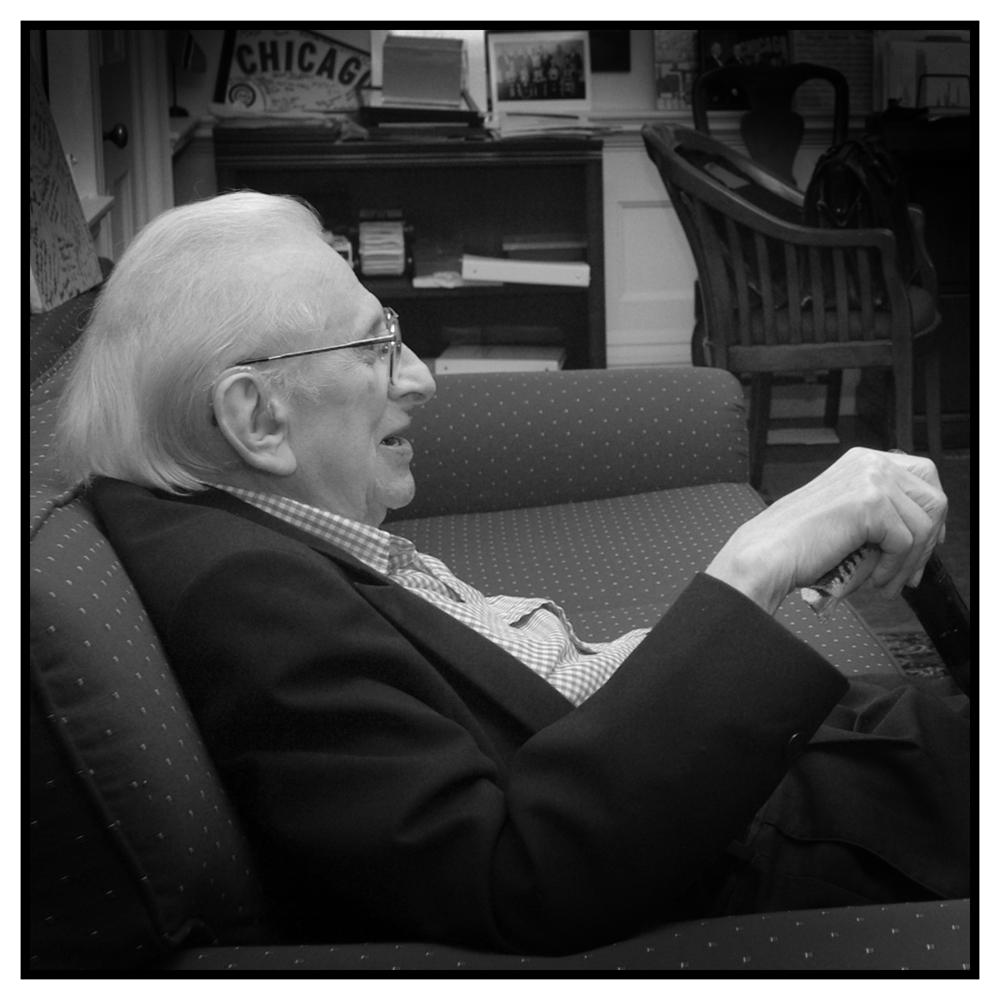
Studs Terkel before his 95th birthday party at the Chicago History Museum

In 2004, Terkel received the Elijah Parish Lovejoy Award as well as an honorary Doctor of Laws degree from Colby College. In August 2005, Terkel underwent successful open-heart surgery. At the age of 93, he was one of the oldest people to undergo this form of surgery and doctors reported his recovery to be remarkable for someone of that advanced age. Terkel smoked two cigars a day until 2004.

On May 22, 2006, Terkel, along with other plaintiffs, including Quentin Young, filed suit in federal district court against AT&T Inc., to stop the telecommunications carrier from giving customer telephone records to the National Security Agency without a court order.

Having been blacklisted from working in television during the McCarthy era, I know the harm of government using private corporations to intrude into the lives of innocent Americans. When the government uses the telephone companies to create massive databases of all our phone calls it has gone too far.

The lawsuit was dismissed by Judge Matthew F. Kennelly on July 26, 2006. Judge Kennelly cited a "state secrets privilege" designed to protect the government from being harmed by lawsuits.

In an interview in The Guardian celebrating his 95th birthday, Terkel discussed his own "diverse and idiosyncratic taste in music, from Bob Dylan to Alexander Frey, Louis Armstrong to Woody Guthrie".

Terkel published a new personal memoir entitled Touch and Go in fall 2007.

Terkel was a self-described agnostic, which he jokingly defined as "a cowardly atheist" during a 2004 interview with Krista Tippett on American Public Media's Speaking of Faith.

One of his last interviews was for the documentary Soul of a People on Smithsonian Channel. He spoke about his participation in the Works Progress Administration.

At his last public appearance, in 2007, Terkel said he was "still in touch—but ready to go". He gave one of his last interviews on the BBC HARDtalk program on February 4, 2008. He spoke of the imminent election of Barack Obama as President of the United States, and offered him some advice, in October 2008.

Terkel died in his Chicago home on Friday, October 31, 2008, at the age of 96. He had been suffering since a fall in his home earlier that month.

== Legacy and audio recordings ==
External audio
- Louis Daniel Armstrong talks with Studs Terkel on WFMT; 1962/6/24, 33:43, Studs Terkel Radio Archive
- Poet Laureate Gwendolyn Brooks talks with Studs – Poetry Month; 1967, 45:01, Studs Terkel Radio Archive
- Studs Terkel's Music Interviews, includes excerpts of interviews with Bob Dylan, Janis Joplin, Oscar Petersen, and Memphis Slim. Library of Congress

From a donation by Terkel, the Chicago History Museum, Library of Congress, and WFMT created the Studs Terkel Radio Archive, digitally preserving his entire interview archive − "a remarkably rich history of the ideas and perspectives of both common and influential people living in the second half of the 20th century," per the Library of Congress.

"For Studs, there was not a voice that should not be heard, a story that could not be told," said Gary T. Johnson, Museum president. "He believed that everyone had the right to be heard and had something important to say. He was there to listen, to chronicle, and to make sure their stories are remembered." On September 5, 2019, podcast The Radio Diaries, produced by Radiotopia on PRX, released an episode called "The Working Tapes of Studs Terkel." In it, Terkel's taped interviews with working people are played and examined.

== Awards and honors ==
In 1982, Terkel was awarded an honorary Doctor of Humane Letters from the University of Illinois at Chicago.

In 1985, Terkel received the Pulitzer Prize for General Nonfiction for his book The Good War.

Bill Clinton, then the President of the United States, awarded Terkel the National Humanities Medal in 1997.

The National Book Foundation awarded Terkel the 1997 Medal for Distinguished Contribution to American Letters.

In 2001, Terkel was made an honorary Doctor of Humane Letters by Northwestern University.

In 2001, Terkel was inducted into the Chicago Gay and Lesbian Hall of Fame as a Friend of the Community.

In 2004, Terkel was inducted as a Laureate of The Lincoln Academy of Illinois and awarded the Order of Lincoln (the State's highest honor) by the Governor of Illinois in the area of Communications.

In 2006, Terkel received the Lifetime Achievement Award from the Dayton Literary Peace Prize, the first and only annual U.S. literary award recognizing the power of the written word to promote peace.

In 2010, Terkel was inducted into the Chicago Literary Hall of Fame.

Terkel was a recipient of the 1999 George Polk Career Award and the National Book Critics Circle 2003 Ivan Sandrof Lifetime Achievement Award.

Terkel, despite not being black, was inducted into Chicago State University's National Literary Hall of Fame for Writers of African Descent at the insistence of Professor Haki Madhubuti.

== Selected works ==
=== Articles ===
- Terkel, Studs, ed. (February 1972). "Servants of the State: Speaking truth to power: an interview with Daniel Ellsberg, Tony Russo and Eqbal Ahmed". Harper's Magazine. Vol. 244, no. 1461. pp. 52+.
- "Women at Work". Ramparts. April 1974. pp. 38–44.

=== Books ===
- Giants of Jazz (1957). ISBN 1-56584-769-5
- Division Street: America (1967), ISBN 0-394-42267-8
- Hard Times: An Oral History of the Great Depression (1970), ISBN 0-394-42774-2
- Working: People Talk About What They Do All Day and How They Feel About What They Do (1974). ISBN 0-394-47884-3
- Talking to Myself: A Memoir of My Times (1973, reprinted 1977), ISBN 0-394-41102-1
- American Dreams: Lost and Found (1983), ISBN 0-345-29736-9
- The Good War (1984), ISBN 0-394-53103-5
- Chicago (1986), ISBN 5-551-54568-7
- The Great Divide: Second Thoughts on the American Dream (1988), ISBN 0-394-57053-7
- Race: What Blacks and Whites Think and Feel About the American Obsession (1992), ISBN 978-1565840003
- Coming of Age: The Story of Our Century by Those Who've Lived It (1995), ISBN 1-56584-284-7
- My American Century (1997), ISBN 1-59558-177-4
- The Spectator: Talk About Movies and Plays With Those Who Make Them (1999), ISBN 1-56584-633-8
- Will the Circle Be Unbroken: Reflections on Death, Rebirth and Hunger for a Faith (2001), ISBN 0-641-75937-1
- Hope Dies Last: Keeping the Faith in Difficult Times (2003), ISBN 1-56584-837-3
- And They All Sang: Adventures of an Eclectic Disc Jockey (2005), ISBN 1-59558-003-4
- Touch and Go (2007), ISBN 1-59558-043-3
- P.S. Further Thoughts from a Lifetime of Listening (2008), ISBN 1-59558-423-4

== Notes ==
1.The Archive is housed at the epononymous https://www.studsterkel.org, which currently redirects to a subdomain of WFMT's website, https://studsterkel.wfmt.com.
