= Pocahontas (franchise) =

Disney media franchise

Disney's Pocahontas
- Original work: Pocahontas (1995)
- Owner: The Walt Disney Company
- Years: 1995-1998

Films and television
- Film: Pocahontas (1995)
- Direct-to-video: Pocahontas II: Journey to a New World (1998)

Games
- Video games: Disney's Animated Storybook: Pocahontas (1995); Disney's Pocahontas (1996)

Audio
- Soundtracks: Pocahontas: An Original Walt Disney Records Soundtrack (1995); Pocahontas II: Journey to a New World (Music from the Motion Picture) (2009)

Miscellaneous
- Theme park attractions: The Spirit of Pocahontas (1995–1997); Pocahontas le Spectacle (1996–1999); Pocahontas Indian Village; Pocahontas and her Forest Friends (1998–2008)

Pocahontas is a Disney media franchise that commenced in 1995 with the theatrical release of Pocahontas. The franchise is based on the real-life early 17th-century indigenous woman, Pocahontas.

== Films ==
=== Pocahontas ===
Pocahontas is a 1995 American animated musical romance-drama film. It was produced by Walt Disney Animation Studios and had a limited release to theaters on June 23, 1995, by Walt Disney Pictures.

=== Pocahontas II: Journey to a New World ===
Pocahontas II: Journey to a New World is a 1998 straight-to-video sequel to the 1995 Disney film Pocahontas. The film focuses on Pocahontas' journey to London, England with John Rolfe to negotiate for peace between the two nations.

== Video games ==
=== Disney's Pocahontas ===
Disney's Pocahontas is a video game based on the 1995 film of the same name, was released on the Sega Genesis in 1996. The Sega title was developed by Funcom on contract with Disney. It was followed by a later release for the Game Boy and PlayStation on June 10, 1996, nearly a year after the film's premiere. A Super NES version of the game was under development around the same time as the Genesis version, but was canceled due to development being too far behind to coincide with the Genesis release.

=== Disney's Animated Storybook: Pocahontas ===
Disney's Animated Storybook: Pocahontas is a part of the Disney's Animated Storybook game series.

=== Disney Magic Kingdoms ===
Disney Magic Kingdoms includes a Pocahontas storyline with Pocahontas, Meeko and Percy as playable characters. Grandmother Willow appears as a non-player character being an attraction, with Flit (also a non-player character) flying around her.

== Theme park attractions ==
=== The Spirit of Pocahontas ===
The Spirit of Pocahontas was a stage show. It was performed in the Fantasyland Theater at Disneyland in California and on the backlot theater that was originally constructed for the Beauty and the Beast stage show at Disney's Hollywood Studios. It opened at Fantasyland on June 23, 1995, and ran through September 4, 1997. It opened on June 23, 1995, at Disney's Hollywood Studios and closed after eight months in February 1996. The show ran for half an hour with special effects and a score and songs by Alan Menken and Stephen Schwartz. The show played five times each day.

The musical told the story of Pocahontas through the perspective of her Native American tribe. Storyteller, Werowance, and the Powhatan tribe tell the story of Pocahontas as they remember it. When Pocahontas is summoned, Werowance takes on the role of her father, Chief Powhatan. To represent the English settlers, members of the tribe don silver ceremonial masks. English adventurer, John Smith, materializes from a burning campfire. The puppet face of Grandmother Willow appears on a huge willow tree to offer guidance to Pocahontas and John Smith.

=== Pocahontas le Spectacle ===
Pocahontas le Spectacle was a stage show that opened on May 12, 1996, in the Chaparral Theater in the Frontierland section of Disneyland Paris. It dealt with much of the same story as The Spirit of Pocahontas. Audience members were given the opportunity to watch the "filming" of the movie Pocahontas, and some volunteers were asked to take the stage as extras in the production. The entire show was done in a combination of English and French. The show’s run ended on August 29, 1999.

Like The Spirit of Pocahontas, the show retells the story of the Disney film version of Pocahontas from the perspective of the storyteller, Werowance, and the Powhatan tribe.

=== Pocahontas Indian Village ===
Pocahontas Indian Village is a part of the Frontierland section of Disneyland Park in Paris, France. Pocahontas Indian Village: Just Around the River Bend is a playground based on a traditional Native American settlement.

=== Pocahontas and her Forest Friends ===
Pocahontas and her Forest Friends was a live stage show at Disney's Animal Kingdom at Disney World in Orlando, Florida. It took place at the Camp Minnie-Mickey land at Grandmother Willow’s Grove, which is a 350-seat outdoor theater built for Pocahontas and her Forest Friends. The show opened on April 22, 1998, and closed in 2008. It was a 12-minute show.

The show was about Pocahontas from the 1995 Disney film of the same name. In the show, Pocahontas and Grandmother Willow, along with a new young tree character named Sprig and a host of live animals, teach the audience about the beauty of nature and how to live with Mother Nature in peace and harmony.

=== Meet and greets ===
Pocahontas is a popular meetable character at the Disney Parks and Resorts, and is located in Frontierland, and at Disney’s Animal Kingdom. She is often accompanied by Meeko, and occasionally John Smith.

== Music ==
=== Pocahontas: An Original Walt Disney Records Soundtrack ===
Pocahontas: An Original Walt Disney Records Soundtrack is the soundtrack to the 1995 Disney animated film, Pocahontas. It contains songs from the film written by Alan Menken and Stephen Schwartz, conducted by David Friedman, and performed by Judy Kuhn, Mel Gibson, Linda Hunt, Jim Cummings and David Ogden Stiers among others, and singles by Jon Secada and Shanice, and Vanessa Williams, along with the film's score composed by Alan Menken. It was released by Walt Disney Records on May 23, 1995, on CD and audio cassette.

- "The Virginia Company"
- "Steady as the Beating Drum"
- "Just Around the Riverbend"
- "Listen with Your Heart"
- "Mine, Mine, Mine"
- "Colors of the Wind"
- "If I Never Knew You"
- "Savages"

=== Pocahontas II: Journey to a New World soundtrack ===
Pocahontas II: Journey to a New World (Music from the Motion Picture) is the soundtrack EP from the 1998 Disney film, Pocahontas II: Journey to a New World.

== Other ==
=== Disney on Ice: Forever Love featuring Pocahontas ===
Disney on Ice: Forever Love featuring Pocahontas was a Disney on Ice show, which made its debut in 1996, a year after the release of Disney's Pocahontas. The ice show toured the United States and the world until 2000.

Mickey and friends presented many Disney animated films on ice, but the main attraction of this show was Disney's newest animated film, Pocahontas. All of the stories presented in the show are about one major theme: a love that lasts forever. Pocahontas's love is presented to the audience as she and her true love, John Smith, paint with all of the "colors of the wind," as they do in the film.

== Controversy ==
Pocahontas is the most well-known example of a Native American woman in mainstream media, and the reception of the 1995 film she stars in has been controversial.

Despite Disney's claims that the Pocahontas franchise was meant to counter prejudice and create cooperation, critics have argued that the storyline contains unacceptable historical inaccuracies.

Critics say the franchise contains harmful stereotypes, overlooks real history, and overshadows the opportunity for real Native American women to be represented in a fair way.

== Cast and characters ==
- ^{S} indicates an appearance as a character's singing voice.

Characters	Films	
Characters	Pocahontas	Pocahontas II: Journey to a New World
Pocahontas	Irene Bedard Judy Kuhn^{S}	Irene Bedard Judy Kuhn^{S}
John Smith	Mel Gibson	Donal Gibson
Governor Ratcliffe	David Ogden Stiers	David Ogden Stiers
Meeko	John Kassir	John Kassir
Flit	Frank Welker	Frank Welker
Percy	Danny Mann	Danny Mann
Grandmother Willow	Linda Hunt	Linda Hunt
Chief Powhatan	Russell Means Jim Cummings^{S}	Russell Means
Nakoma	Michelle St. John	Michelle St. John
Kekata	Gordon Tootoosis Jim Cummings^{S}	
Kocoum	James Apaumut Fall	
Thomas	Christian Bale	
Ben	Billy Connolly	
Lon	Joe Baker	
Wiggins	David Ogden Stiers	
John Rolfe		Billy Zane
King James	Silent Cameo	Jim Cummings
Queen Anne		Finola Hughes
Mrs. Jenkins		Jean Stapleton
Uttamatomakkin		Brad Garrett
