= Pocahontas (disambiguation) =

Pocahontas was a Pamunkey Algonquian chief's daughter from early American history.

Pocahontas may also refer to:

== Literature ==
- Pocahontas, and Other Poems, an 1841 poetry collection by L. H. Sigourney
- Pocahontas and Her Descendants, an 1887 work by Wyndham Robertson
- Pocahontas: A Story of Virginia, an 1893 book by John R. Musick
- Pocahontas, a 1906 book by Ella Loraine Dorsey
- Pocahontas, a 1930 narrative poem by Nathalia Crane
- Pocahontas or the Nonparell of Virginia, a 1933 novel by David Garnett

== Film and television ==
- Pocahontas (1910 film), a silent film
- Pocahontas (1994 film), a Japanese animated film by Toshiyuki Hiruma Takashi
- Pocahontas (1995 film), a Disney film
  - Pocahontas (character)
  - Pocahontas (franchise)
  - Pocahontas (soundtrack)
- Pocahontas: The Legend, a 1995 Canadian feature film
- Pocahontas, a 1995 animation by Burbank Animation Studios
- Pocahontas, a 1995 animation by Golden Films
- Pocahontas, a 1997 animated TV series by Mondo TV
- "Pocahontas", an episode of Animated Hero Classics

== Places ==
=== Canada ===
- Pocahontas, Alberta, Canada, a campground and unincorporated area

=== United States ===
- Pocahontas, Arkansas, a city
- Pocahontas, Illinois, a village
- Pocahontas, Iowa, a city and county seat
- Pocahontas County, Iowa
- Pocahontas, Mississippi, an unincorporated community
- Pocahontas, Missouri, a village
- Pocahontas, Oregon, a former community
- Pocahontas, Tennessee, an unincorporated community
- Pocahontas, Coffee County, Tennessee, an unincorporated community
- Pocahontas, Virginia, a town
- Fort Pocahontas, an American Civil War fortification in Charles City County, Virginia
- Pocahontas County, West Virginia

== Schools ==
=== United States ===
- Pocahontas School District, Arkansas
- Pocahontas High School (Arkansas)
- Pocahontas Area Community School District, Iowa
- Pocahontas High School (Iowa), winner of the 2001 National High School Mock Trial Championship
- Pocahontas School, a former elementary school in Pocahontas, Tennessee

== Ships ==
- USS Pocahontas (1852), a screw steamer
- USS Pocahontas (AT-18), an ocean tug renamed Chemung in 1917
- USS Pocahontas (ID-3044), a troop transport during World War I
- USS Pocahontas (YT-266), a tug transferred to Naval service in 1942
- SS Pocahontas (1900), an ocean liner
- SS Pocahontas (1942), a Liberty ship

== Other uses ==
- Racial Integrity Act of 1924, the Pocahontas Clause (Pocahontas Exception)
- MC Pocahontas, a former stage name of Brazilian singer-songwriter Viviane de Queiroz Pereira (later known as Pocah)
- Pocahontas (horse), Thoroughbred racehorse
- Pocahontas (nickname), a nickname used by Donald Trump to refer to Elizabeth Warren
- "Pocahontas" (song), a 1979 song by Neil Young from Rust Never Sleeps
- Pocahantas (train), a Norfolk and Western Railway passenger train from 1926 to 1971
- Pocahontas (video game), a video game based on the Disney film
- Po-ca-hon-tas, or The Gentle Savage, an 1855 musical burlesque by John Brougham
- 4487 Pocahontas, an asteroid
- Pocahontas, a statue by William Ordway Partridge

== See also ==
- Degree of Pocahontas, the female auxiliary of an American fraternal order
- Lower Thames and Medway Passenger Boat Company, a company that operates the MV Princess Pocahontas river tour boat
- Pocahontas Coalfield, a coalfield in Virginia and West Virginia
- Pocahontas Mounds, an archaeological site in Hinds County, Mississippi
- Pocahontas Stakes, an American annual horse race
- Pocahontas State Correctional Center, a prison in Virginia
- Pocahontas State Park, a park in Chesterfield, Virginia
