= If I Never Knew You =

1995 single by Jon Secada and Shanice

Single by Jon Secada and Shanice

from the album Pocahontas: An Original Walt Disney Records Soundtrack
- B-side: "Mine, Mine, Mine"; "Pocahontas"
- Released: August 19, 1995
- Length: 4:11
- Label: Hollywood; Walt Disney
- Composer: Alan Menken
- Lyricist: Stephen Schwartz
- Producers: Emilio Estefan, Jr.; Robbie Buchanan

Jon Secada singles chronology
"Mental Picture" (1995)	"If I Never Knew You" (1995)	"Too Late Too Soon" (1997)

Shanice singles chronology
"I Wish" (1994)	"If I Never Knew You" (1995)	"When I Close My Eyes" (1999)

"If I Never Knew You" is a song by American singers Jon Secada and Shanice, from Disney's 1995 animated feature film, Pocahontas. The song was written by composer Alan Menken and lyricist Stephen Schwartz, and originally recorded by American singer Judy Kuhn in her film role as the singing voice of Pocahontas, and American actor Mel Gibson in his role as Captain John Smith. Shanice and Secada's version is heard during the film's end credits, and was released on August 19, 1995, as the second single from the film's soundtrack by Walt Disney Records, after Vanessa Williams' pop and R&B rendition of the Academy Award-winning "Colors of the Wind".

The song was originally developed for the prison scene where Pocahontas visits Captain John Smith before he is sentenced to death for the alleged murder of Kocoum, Chief Powhatan's warrior whom Pocahontas was supposed to marry. The musical number, which was about 90% animated, was supposed to be a duet performed by the pair as they acknowledge their love for each other. During test screenings with child audiences their attention "seemed to wander from the film." Therefore, Alan Menken, the composer of the songs for Disney's Pocahontas, decided it had to be cut because he felt that it slowed the pace of the movie. Additionally, another song, "Savages", occurred not more than five minutes after. Although it was cut from the movie itself, "If I Never Knew You" was still performed by Jon Secada and Shanice at the end credits and released as a single. It had a few different lyrics than the film's original lyrics.

In 2005, Disney released the tenth anniversary edition of Pocahontas, which had the song fully animated and integrated into the film, but was an optional feature that the viewer could choose or watch the original theatrical version instead, due to seamless branching. It was performed by Mel Gibson (Captain Smith) and Judy Kuhn (singing voice of Pocahontas) within the film's narrative. It was recorded for the original film in 1995. The audio version became available in 2015 for the Walt Disney Records: The Legacy Collection edition of the film's soundtrack.

== Charts ==
Chart (1995)	Peak position
Australia (ARIA)	128
Scottish Singles Sales (Official Charts)	62
UK Singles (Official Charts)	51
US Bubbling Under Hot 100 (Billboard)	8
US Latin Pop Airplay (Billboard) "Si no te conociera"	7

== Release history ==
Region	Date	Format(s)	Label(s)	Ref.
Japan	August 19, 1995	Mini-CD	Walt Disney	
United States	September 12, 1995	7-inch vinyl; CD; cassette	Hollywood; Walt Disney	
United Kingdom	December 4, 1995	CD; cassette	Walt Disney	

== The Cheetah Girls version ==
"If I Never Knew You"

Single by the Cheetah Girls

from the album DisneyMania 4
- Released: April 2006
- Length: 3:16
- Label: Walt Disney
- Composer: Alan Menken
- Lyricist: Stephen Schwartz

The Cheetah Girls singles chronology
"Five More Days 'til Christmas" (2005)	"If I Never Knew You" (2006)	"The Party's Just Begun" (2006)

"If I Never Knew You" was covered by the Cheetah Girls for the album, DisneyMania 4. It was released as a single and premiered on Radio Disney in April 2006.

=== Music video ===
The music video was released on Disney Channel in 2006. It features the girls pulling up at a club in a limo wearing white, sparkly dresses and then entering the club to perform the song on stage surrounded by a crowd. Scenes of the girls out on the dance floor dancing with some gentlemen are inter-cut throughout the video.

== Other cover versions ==
In 2001, it was covered by Michael Crawford and Sherie Rene Scott for The Disney Album. That same year, Angela Decicco and Bill Whitefield covered the song on the 2001 Christian/Gospel compilation album Our Heart Sings. Hal Ketchum and Shelby Lynne recorded a version as part of The Best of Country Sing the Best of Disney. The song was also released as a Spanish single ("Si No Te Conociera," also performed by Jon Secada and Shanice). A Portuguese version was sung by Jon Secada and Daniela Mercury. The song was recently covered by Tiffany Thornton as part of DisneyMania 7. In Japan, a music box version was released on the 2008 album Disney in Orgel.

== See also ==
- Pocahontas (1995 film)
- Pocahontas (soundtrack)
- "Colors of the Wind"
