= Savages (Pocahontas song) =

Song by David Ogden Stiers, Jim Cummings and Judy Kuhn

from the album Pocahontas: An Original Disney Records Soundtrack
- Released: May 30, 1995
- Genre: Show tune
- Length: 1:43 (Part 1); 2:15 (Part 2)
- Label: Walt Disney Records
- Composer: Alan Menken
- Lyricist: Stephen Schwartz
- Producers: Alan Menken; Stephen Schwartz

"Savages" is a song from the 1995 Disney animated film Pocahontas. It addresses the pejorative term and includes themes of othering, xenophobia, and genocide.

== Synopsis ==
The song sees the colonists and the Native Americans singing about how the other groups are savages, and how they will go to war to wipe out the other race. The "Powhatans and the colonists break into the same song as they prepare for the upcoming battle".

== Composition ==
Pocahontas sings counterpoint melodies during the song which are variations on "Colors of the Wind" and "Steady As The Beating Drum". She sings of peace and love to juxtapose their words.

The song has two parts. The first part sees the colonists and the natives each declare the other to be inhuman as they prepare to fight. The second part intertwines Pocahontas' race to stop the execution of John Smith with the colonists and natives vowing to destroy and exterminate the other side.

This has been described as a "war call that brings back fond memories of the ensemble layers of "The Mob Song" in the 1991 film Beauty and the Beast and the ominous tone of 'Hellfire' in the 1996 film The Hunchback of Notre Dame".

== Themes ==
The song seemingly condemns the mixing of races, which some critiques have said is a social construct. The colonist side is critical of those who do not believe in the Christian God. The Native Americans also demonize the white colonists, describing them as "demon" and "paleface", and "wonder[ing] if they even bleed". It is "heavily emphasized that the difference between the two peoples are the real cause of the war".

== Reception ==
The Washington Post wrote "The most heavy-handed of the seven songs composed by Alan Menken with lyrics by Stephen Schwartz, "Savages" lacks the vivacity and wit that Menken's late partner, Howard Ashman, brought to previous Disney musicals". Hidefdigest said "From "Just Around the Riverbend" to "Savages," 'Pocahontas' has one of the Disney's most unforgettable soundtracks". It however praised the audio and visual quality: "Each of the memorable songs is belted at lofty volumes that seem to surround the listener. The best example of this is the "Savages" musical number. The sub-woofer pounds out the drum beats while both camps sing about their hate for each other. Their voices echo throughout the soundfield. The low-end sonics are deep and rumbling. It's probably the best sounding sequence of the whole film." Americana E-Journal said "This song "Savages" does not lack political incorrectness; moreover, it is nothing but the shocking anger and grievance felt against the other" and notes the song serves as a substitute to actually depicting the bloody war.

The "Pocahontas Paradox: A Cautionary Tale for Educators" describes the song as "especially unsettling" and "brutal", arguing "[w]hile the song presumably meant to unearth and thus neutralize from a perspective 350 years after the fact a pervasive racism of the earlier era, the song nonetheless embodies a complexity of attitudes and beliefs that remain, at their core, offensive to American Indian people and needless to say detrimental to Indian children". University of Texas anthropologist Pauline Turner Strong wrote "for many Native Americans 'savage' is the 'S' word, as potent and degrading as the word 'rigger.' [sic] I cannot imagine the latter epithet repeated so often, and set to music in a G-rated film and its soundtrack. It is even more shocking to write it in a review. Is 'savage' more acceptable because it is used reciprocally? But then does this not downplay the role the colonial ideology of savagism played in the extermination and dispossession of indigenous people."
