= Metropolis (musical) =

Musical

- Music: Joe Brooks
- Lyrics: Joe Brooks; Dusty Hughes
- Book: Dusty Hughes
- Basis: 1927 film, Metropolis
- Productions: 1989 London; 1989 Germany; 1994 Cicero, Illinois; 2002 Salem, Oregon; 2010 Seattle; 2017 London

Metropolis is a musical based on the 1927 silent movie of the same name that was staged at the Piccadilly Theatre in London in 1989. The music was written by Joe Brooks, the lyrics by Dusty Hughes. The show was directed by Jérôme Savary. The cast included Judy Kuhn, Brian Blessed, Graham Bickley, Jonathan Adams, Paul Keown and Stifyn Parri. The musical marked the London debut of Judy Kuhn, who left the show shortly before the end of its run to be replaced by Mary Lincoln. The production was notable for its set design by Ralph Koltai.

After that time Joe Brooks worked with American Randy Bowser at editing the already finished musical. By 2002 they had created a more complete libretto to the show, and it was first produced at the Pentacle Theater in Salem, Oregon.

A new 5-star production, the very first London Revival, was announced on 13 September 2017, which was performed at the Ye Olde Rose and Crown Theatre, from 10 October 2017 to 5 November 2017.

== Synopsis ==
=== Act I ===
The city of Metropolis - around the year 2000. It is the invention of John Freeman who now runs it like a despot, a city that exists in a world of perpetual night, a world that has had its energy resources exhausted. Metropolis is a beautiful experiment but it too is doomed because the only source of energy to power the city is human energy, which is harnessed ruthlessly for the benefit of the Elitists who live above. The workers operate vast machines below the city and power the privileged lives of the upper class on the surface of the city. Workers are forbidden to read and to learn, and they never see daylight. Among the workers who toil below is Maria who holds onto the memory of the world with a sun, flowers, birds and trees. She risks her life by giving clandestine lessons to the children of the workers so that the memory will never die and in the hope that someday freedom may soon be possible. Accidental deaths are frequent and when Jade—girlfriend of worker 11811, George—is mutilated and dies in the cogs of the machinery, Maria believes that the time is ripe for the children to be shown the world above. John Freeman's son, Steven, the heir apparent to Metropolis does not share his father's vision of total power: he has a conscience and his father, aware of this, attempts to keep Steven in ignorance of the appalling conditions in which the workers live and toil in the underworld.

Maria and her band of children briefly escape from the underground and she and Steven meet fleetingly. He is haunted by her innocence and beauty and wonders whether these thoughts could possibly be love. He follows her into the depths of the underworld and so that he might experience for himself the conditions of life as a worker - and to be near Maria - he changes clothes with George and ends up at one of the machines while George, unrecognised, finds his way to the upper levels to be with the Elitists. Steven follows Maria and discovers that she is the spiritual leader of the workers. His journey, however, has not gone unnoticed by his father and Freeman's valet Jeremiah. A plan is devised to eliminate Maria and to subjugate the workers further. The scientist Warner has come close to perfecting a robot that is designed to replace the workers. His prototype robot is called Futura and only needs a face to be complete. Maria is kidnapped and her face is ingeniously copied and reconstructed onto the robot. Futura, obedient only to John Freeman's commands, is sent, as Maria, to the underworld to persuade the workers to work even harder and to allow the children to work the machines.

=== Act II ===
Warner, like Steven, is overwhelmed by Maria's innocence and agrees to set her free. His duplicity is discovered and Warner is executed for his act of treason but Maria is free to lead the workers again. In the underworld, Futura malfunctions and, intending to kill Steven, murders George who, disguised as Steven has returned. The workers recognise Futura to be the work of the devil, i.e. Freeman, and throw her into the furnace. At the moment of Futura's destruction, Maria returns. The workers rebel and threaten to destroy Metropolis by attacking the machines, but without energy Metropolis cannot survive. Maria and Steven lead the workers to the relative safety of the upper world. John Freeman hears that his son has been killed by Futura and that it and his beloved machines have been destroyed. He becomes insane with rage and grief and blows up the control room of the city, killing himself and his right-hand man Jeremiah in the conflagration. The future is now in the hands of Steven and Maria as they lead the workers and children into the light as the city, no longer supported by their hard labor, collapses.

== Original London cast ==
- Brian Blessed as John Freeman
- Judy Kuhn as Maria/Futura
- Graham Bickley as Steven
- Jonathan Adams as Warner
- Paul Keown as Jeremiah
- Stifyn Parri as George
- Lindsey Danvers as Jade
- Colin Fay as Groat
- Megan Kelly as Lake
- Robert Fardell as Marco
- Lucy Dixon as Lulu
- Kevin Power as Worker #1
- Gael Johnson as Beso

== Musical numbers ==
Act I

- "101.11" – Company
- "Hold Back the Night" – Maria, Jade, George, Marco & Company
- "The Machines are Beautiful" – Freeman
- "He's Distant from Me Now" – Steven
- "Elitists' Dance" (Instrumental)
- "Children of Metropolis" – Maria
- "One More Morning" – Steven
- "It's Only Love" – Steven
- "Bring on the Night" – Maria
- "You are the Light" – Maria and Company
- "The Sun" – George
- "There's a Girl Down Below" – Jeremiah
- "Futura" – Warner, Freeman and Company

Act II

- "We're the Cream" – Elitists
- "This is Life" – Steven, Jeremiah and Company
- "Futura's Dance" – Maria and Company
- "If That Was Love" – Steven
- "Listen to Me" – Steven and George
- "Learning Song" – Maria and Children
- "Old Friends" – Warner
- "When Maria Wakes" – Company
- "Futura's Promise" – Futura
- "Haven't You Finished With Me?" – Maria and Warner
- "Let's Watch the World Go to the Devil" – Futura and Company
- "One of Those Nights" – Maria
- "Requiem" – Company
- "Metropolis" – Freeman
- "Finale" – Company

== Changes from the film ==
The main changes between the silent film and the musical are name changes for many of the characters (Joh Fredersen to John Freeman, Freder Fredersen to Steven, Rotwang to Warner, Hel to Helen), slightly different religious themes, a completely different ending, and a larger focus on the children.

== Awards and nominations ==
=== Original London Production ===
Year	Award	Category	Nominee	Result
1989	Laurence Olivier Award	Best Actress in a Musical	Judy Kuhn	Nominated

=== London Revival Production ===
Year	Award	Category	Nominee	Result
2017	Offie	Best Actress in a Musical	Miiya Alexandra	Nominated
2017	Offie	Best Musical Director	Aaron Clingham	Nominated
2017	Offie	Best Set Design	Justin Williams Stage Design	Nominated
2017	Offie	Best Costume Design	Joana Dias	Nominated
