= Pres Romanillos =

American animator

Priscillano Antonio Romanillos
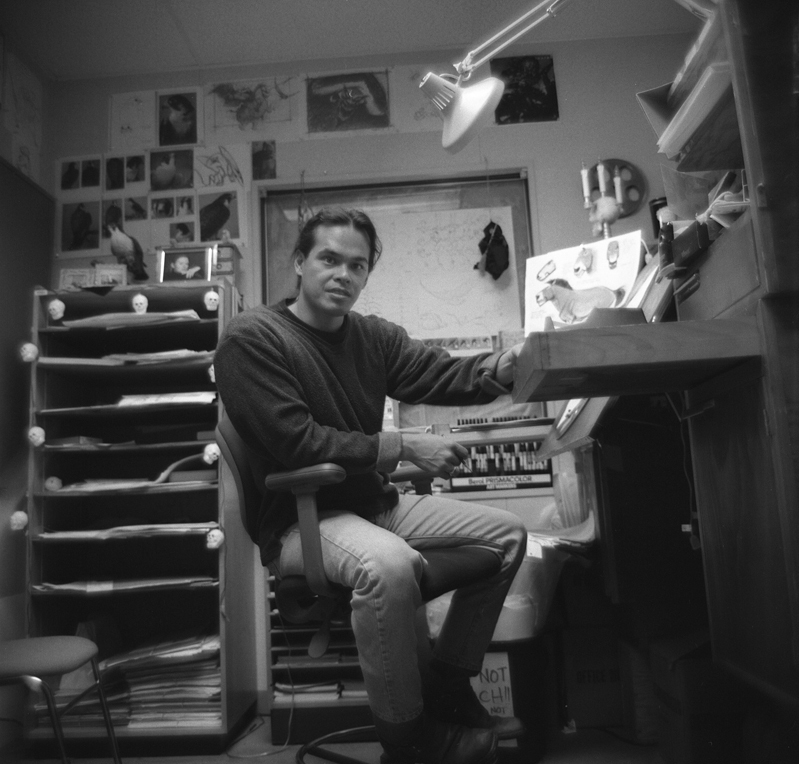
- Pres Romanillos at his drawing board during production of Disney's Mulan.
- Born: January 11, 1963; Zamboanga City, Philippines
- Died: July 17, 2010 (aged 47); Tujunga California, U.S.
- Occupations: Animator; Illustrator
- Years active: 1989–2010
- Spouse: Jeannine
- Website: http://lifeasapickle.blogspot.com

Priscillano "Pres" Antonio Romanillos (January 11, 1963 – July 17, 2010) was an American animator with DreamWorks and Walt Disney. His work included animated characters such as the Native American Little Creek in DreamWorks' Spirit: Stallion of the Cimarron, Pocahontas, and the villainous Hun Shan-Yu in Disney's Mulan.

== Early life ==
Romanillos was born on January 11, 1963, in Zamboanga City in the Philippines. When he was six years old, His family moved to Queens, New York City, where he grew up. As a boy, his older brother Bob had begun an art correspondence course but he eventually lost interest in it, leaving the younger Romanillos to try out the assignments himself. Later he enrolled at the School of Visual Arts in Manhattan, successfully graduating with a master's degree in Fine Art.

== Career in animation ==
=== Disney ===
In 1989, Romanillos was hired by Disney Animation, who were at the time actively recruiting animators. He began as an animation trainee, working on many Disney films, including The Little Mermaid (1989), The Rescuers Down Under (1990), Beauty and the Beast (1991), Aladdin (1992), Pocahontas (1995), The Hunchback of Notre Dame (1996), Mulan (1998), and The Princess and the Frog (2009). Early on he impressed many of his colleagues. Supervising animator Ruben A. Aquino met him while working on The Little Mermaid, and said of him: "from the very beginning, I was impressed by his beautiful draftsmanship, but even more by his incredible passion for animation."

On Pocahontas he was promoted to animator, working under lead animator Glen Keane, who described him as "a man who loved to draw. When he came to the edge of his paper, his pencil didn't stop; he continued to draw characters onto the wood of his animation desk." Director Eric Goldberg said of his work: "It was so beautiful, Mike [Gabriel] and I glanced at each other briefly and said, 'Yep, you're an animator'."

Eventually he was given a lead role on Disney's Mulan, working at the new studio in Florida, and creating the character of Shan-Yu, the leader of the Hun army. Mulan co-director Barry Cook described Shan-Yu as "a straight villain who needed to feel like a real threat to our heroine. Pres pulled that off in an amazing way."

In a 1998 interview Romanillos described the character he had created:

"The challenge in animating him was to convey his weight and gravity: He's like a force of impending doom. Unconsciously, I would scowl all day while I was drawing him. When I worked on Pocahontas, I would go home feeling sexy; with Shan-Yu, my wife was always asking, 'Why are you so angry?'"

=== DreamWorks ===
He was an early hire at DreamWorks when Jeffrey Katzenberg left Disney animation to start up his own studio, and worked on many DreamWorks pictures including The Road to El Dorado (2000), and Sinbad: Legend of the Seven Seas (2003). On Spirit: Stallion of the Cimarron (2002) he was given a lead role, supervising the animation of Native American Little Creek. Later, he successfully made the transition to computer animation, working on Shrek 2 (2004) and Madagascar (2005).

In 2006, he began to draw a regular blog titled "Life as a Pickle," based on the many pets he and his wife Jeannine had rescued and looked after at their home, most notably the eponymous Pickle, a rat terrier.

== Illness and death ==
In July 2007, Romanillos traveled to Salamanca, Spain, where he assisted in setting up the Enne Animation Studio along with fellow animation artist Scott Johnston. At Enne he completed an animated short film titled The Old Chair, featuring characters from his blog.

In Salamanca, he was diagnosed with leukemia, even though he continued to do animation projects. Returning to the United States, he underwent chemotherapy and returned to work in July 2009, this time back at the Disney studio on The Princess and the Frog.

He suffered a relapse in March 2010, and the escalating cost of treatment led members of the Los Angeles animation community, including fellow animator and Animation Guild President Kevin Koch, to organize an art auction known as Pres Aid, in order to raise funds to defray medical expenses. Around 150 items were donated, many of significant value, and approximately $65,000 was raised at the event.

Romanillos died on July 17, 2010, at the age of 47. Jeffrey Katzenberg, founder and CEO of DreamWorks Animation, described him as "one of the most respected and beloved artists at our studio". Steve Hulett, business representative of the Animation Guild, said of him that "If there was anyone in this wacky business who deserved another twenty or thirty years of artistic success, Pres was at or near the top of the list."

== Filmography ==
Year	Title	Credits	Characters
1989	Rain	Storyboard Artist	
1989	The Little Mermaid	Animation Trainee	
1990	The Rescuers Down Under	Assistant Animator	
1991	Beauty and the Beast	Assistant Animator	Beast
1992	Aladdin	Rough Inbetweener	
1995	Pocahontas	Animator	Pocahontas
1996	The Hunchback of Notre Dame	Additional Animator	
1998	Mulan	Supervising Animator	Shan-Yu, Hayabusa the Falcon and Elite Huns Soldiers
2000	The Road to El Dorado	Animator	Jaguar
2002	Spirit: Stallion of the Cimarron	Character Designer / Supervising Animator	Little Creek
2003	Sinbad: Legend of the Seven Seas	Supervising Animator	Dunbar's Crew
2004	Shrek 2	Animator	
2005	Madagascar	Animator	
2009	The Princess and the Frog	Animator	Prince Naveen
