= Just Around the Riverbend =

Song by Judy Kuhn

from the album Pocahontas: An Original Disney Records Soundtrack
- Released: May 30, 1995
- Genre: Show tune
- Length: 2:28
- Label: Walt Disney Records
- Composer: Alan Menken
- Lyricist: Stephen Schwartz
- Producers: Alan Menken; Stephen Schwartz

"Just Around the Riverbend" is a song from the 1995 Disney animated film Pocahontas.

== Synopsis ==
In the film, "Just Around the Riverbend" serves as Pocahontas' "I want" song, where she decides if she will follow tradition and the safe choice, or whether she will explore the unknown and have new adventures. This is illustrated with the metaphor of two paths in the river: one straight and calm, and the other coursing "just around the riverbend". She marvels at how the river can change its course so effortlessly, twisting and turning, and ending up somewhere new and exciting.

== Development ==
One of the main problems with the story from a song concept perspective was how to "start Pocahontas' story musically". Stephen Schwartz reasoned that as Pocahontas doesn't really want anything until John Smith shows up, there isn't much for her to sing about. His wife Carole decided that Pocahontas would have a dream that something was about to happen (due to dreams being a large part of Native American culture). As Pocahontas was a reinterpretation of the Romeo and Juliet story, and the first song sung by Tony in the Romeo and Juliet based musical West Side Story is "Something's Coming", Schwartz explains that "Just Around the Riverbend" is essentially "the Native American version of Something's Coming". The subtext is that she wants more than just a husband, and wants to instead break free and do her own thing.

The song wasn't immediately liked by the studio executives at Disney. Though he and his writing partner Alan Menken wrote another song to fit into that section of the movie, they requested the heads relisten to a tweaked version of their song. This time it was accepted.

== Analysis ==
Contemporary Media Culture and the Remnants of a Colonial Past argues that this song is equivalent to Belle's desire of wanting "more than this provincial life" in Beauty and the Beast, and that she seeks to become emancipated from the Native American patriarchy by an external force (which turns out to be the colonists, though she does not know it at the time). It also says that Pocahontas has an "'innate feminine' desire to find true bourgeois romance 'just around the riverbend'".

Hollywood's Indian: The Portrayal of the Native American in Film describes Pocahontas' persona at the point when she sings this song as "youthful irresponsibility", contrasting this to her "mature self-knowledge through courage and love" which she adopts throughout the course of the movie.

== Certifications ==
Region	Certification	Certified units/sales
United Kingdom (BPI)	Silver	200,000^{‡}
United States (RIAA)	Platinum	1,000,000^{‡}
^{‡} Sales+streaming figures based on certification alone.
