= Pocahontas (soundtrack) =

Pocahontas: An Original Walt Disney Records Soundtrack

Soundtrack album by Various artists
- Released: May 30, 1995
- Recorded: 1994–1995
- Studios: Todd-AO Scoring, Los Angeles; Signet Sound Studios, Los Angeles; The Hit Factory, New York City; Paramount Stage M, Hollywood; Sony Music Studios, New York City
- Genre: Show tunes
- Length: 55:08
- Label: Walt Disney
- Producers: Alan Menken; Stephen Schwartz

Singles from Pocahontas: An Original Walt Disney Records Soundtrack
- 1. "Colors of the Wind" Released: May 23, 1995; 2. "If I Never Knew You" Released: September 12, 1995

Professional ratings
Review scores
Source	Rating
Allmusic	2/5 stars
Filmtracks	4/5 stars

Pocahontas: An Original Walt Disney Records Soundtrack is the soundtrack album to the 1995 Disney animated film Pocahontas. It was released by Walt Disney Records on May 30, 1995, on CD and audio cassette. The soundtrack contains score and songs from the film, including each instrumental song, composed by Alan Menken and Stephen Schwartz, and conducted by David Friedman. The main songs feature vocals by Judy Kuhn, Mel Gibson, Linda Hunt, Jim Cummings, David Ogden Stiers, and Bobbi Page. The soundtrack features two hit singles; "Colors of the Wind" performed by American singer and actress Vanessa L. Williams, and the film's love theme song "If I Never Knew You" performed by American singers Jon Secada and Shanice. The film won the Academy Award for Best Original Score and Best Original Song (for "Colors of the Wind").

In honor of the film's 20th anniversary, the soundtrack was remastered and reissued as the eleventh entry of The Legacy Collection series. The Legacy edition includes the film's complete original soundtrack in chronological order, along with six demo recordings in a two-disc set. There are 28 tracks on disc one, and 14 tracks on disc two. This release includes the song "If I Never Knew You", performed by Kuhn and Gibson in the film. The original song performed by the characters was cut from the film, and not included on the original soundtrack. The song was put back into the movie when it was re-released for the 10th anniversary of the film, and finally featured on the new edition of the soundtrack.

== Background ==
The music for Pocahontas has one of the largest and most complex scores ever written for a Disney animated film. It was the fourth Disney animated film that was composed by Alan Menken. He had previously worked with lyricist Howard Ashman, who died before the making of Pocahontas. He began working with Stephen Schwartz, who became the lyricist for the soundtrack.

Schwartz was recommended to Menken by people at Disney. On a documentary of the soundtrack, Menken says that after he thought about it he realized that Schwartz' style would be perfect for the film's music because of his writing that is a brilliant combination of theater, folk, and classic. Menken said, "I just really felt that he and I would be able to find a voice that was unique to the two of us together, and we did." The first song they wrote together was "Colors of the Wind". According to Jim Pentecost, the producer of the film, the emotion of the lyrics and music for "Colors of the Wind" was very powerful and defined the movie and what it was going to be about. The song was written at the beginning stages of developing the story. Jim Pentecost said, "When Stephen came up with the title 'Colors of the Wind' and developed his lyric, it helped greatly to tell us what this movie should be."

Menken and Schwartz came together and were able to create this soundtrack based on things they felt strongly about and found a way of expressing through music. On the soundtrack documentary video, Schwartz talked about how they knew what they wanted to say through the music and portray who Pocahontas was, and they were able to find the parts of themselves that met with the character of Pocahontas to create the music for the film.

== Track listing ==
All lyrics are written by Stephen Schwartz; all music is composed by Alan Menken.

Side 1
No.	Title	Performer(s)	Length
1.	"The Virginia Company"	Chorus	1:30
2.	"Ship at Sea (Score)"	Alan Menken	2:34
3.	"The Virginia Company (Reprise)"	Mel Gibson and Chorus	0:35
4.	"Steady as the Beating Drum (Main Title)"	Chorus	1:46
5.	"Steady as the Beating Drum (Reprise)"	Jim Cummings	0:45
6.	"Just Around the Riverbend"	Judy Kuhn	2:27
7.	"Grandmother Willow (Score)"	Alan Menken	1:27
8.	"Listen With Your Heart I"	Linda Hunt, Bobbi Page	1:12
9.	"Mine, Mine, Mine"	David Ogden Stiers, Mel Gibson, and Chorus	3:05
10.	"Listen with Your Heart II"	Linda Hunt, Bobbi Page	2:46
11.	"Colors of the Wind"	Judy Kuhn	3:34
12.	"Savages (Part 1)"	David Ogden Stiers, Jim Cummings & Chorus	1:43
13.	"Savages (Part 2)"	Judy Kuhn, David Ogden Stiers, Jim Cummings & Chorus	2:15
14.	"I’ll Never See Him Again (Score)"	Alan Menken	1:55

Side 2
No.	Title	Performer(s)	Length
15.	"Pocahontas (Score)"	Alan Menken	1:22
16.	"Council Meeting (Score)"	Alan Menken	1:11
17.	"Percy's Bath (Score)"	Alan Menken	0:51
18.	"River's Edge (Score)"	Alan Menken	1:27
19.	"Skirmish (Score)"	Alan Menken	2:02
20.	"Getting Acquainted (Score)"	Alan Menken	1:30
21.	"Ratcliffe's Plan (Score)"	Alan Menken	1:47
22.	"Picking Corn (Score)"	Alan Menken	0:55
23.	"The Warriors Arrive (Score)"	Alan Menken	1:23
24.	"John Smith Sneaks Out (Score)"	Alan Menken	1:14
25.	"Execution (Score)"	Alan Menken	1:34
26.	"Farewell (Score)"	Alan Menken & Chorus	4:47
27.	"Colors of the Wind (End Title)"	Vanessa Williams	4:17
28.	"If I Never Knew You (End Title)"	Jon Secada & Shanice	4:13

== Chart and commercial success ==
The film's soundtrack is probably best known for the song that serves as the film's anthem, "Colors of the Wind", which went on to win an Academy Award, a Golden Globe Award, and a Grammy Award. As a single, "Colors of the Wind" went on to reach #4 on the U.S. pop charts in 1995, and was one of Williams' biggest hits. The Pocahontas soundtrack joined other Disney animated feature soundtrack albums in the multi-platinum category in the certifications from the Recording Industry Association of America. Pocahontas was simultaneously certified triple-platinum, platinum and gold. It became the fifth consecutive soundtrack for a Disney animated film to surpass the 3 million milestone, following The Little Mermaid, Beauty and the Beast, Aladdin, and The Lion King.

The soundtrack also won the Academy Award for Best Musical or Comedy Score, sold 2.3 million copies in the remaining two months of 1995 alone, and went on to reach No. 1 on the Billboard 200.

== Charts ==
=== Weekly charts ===
Chart (1995)	Peak position
Australian Albums (ARIA)	19
Austrian Albums (Ö3 Austria)	35
Belgian Albums (Ultratop Flanders)	32
Belgian Albums (Ultratop Wallonia)	11
Canada Top Albums/CDs (RPM)	3
New Zealand Albums (RMNZ)	8
Swedish Albums (Sverigetopplistan)	44
Swiss Albums (Schweizer Hitparade)	36
US Billboard 200	1

=== Year-end charts ===
Chart (1995)	Position
Canada Top Albums/CDs (RPM)	60
US Billboard 200	23
Chart (1996)	Position
US Billboard 200	174

=== Singles ===
Chart (1995)	Peak position	Single	Artist
Billboard Hot 100	4	"Colors of the Wind"	Vanessa L. Williams
Hot R&B / Hip Hop Singles & Tracks	53	"Colors of the Wind"	Vanessa L. Williams
Australia Singles Chart	16	"Colors of the Wind"	Vanessa L. Williams
UK Singles Chart	21	"Colors of the Wind"	Vanessa L. Williams
UK Singles Chart	51	"If I Never Knew You"	Jon Secada and Shanice

== Certifications and sales ==
Region	Certification	Certified units/sales
Australia (ARIA)	Gold	35,000^{^}
Belgium (BRMA)	Gold	25,000^{*}
Canada (Music Canada)	4× Platinum	400,000^{^}
France (SNEP)	Gold	100,000^{*}
Germany (BVMI)	Platinum	500,000^{^}
New Zealand (RMNZ)	Gold	7,500^{^}
Sweden (GLF)	Gold	50,000^{^}
United States (RIAA)	3× Platinum	3,000,000^{^}
^{*} Sales figures based on certification alone.^{^} Shipments figures based on certification alone.
