= Disney's Pocahontas (video game) =

1996 video game

Pocahontas
- Developers: Funcom (Genesis); Tiertex (Game Boy)
- Publishers: Genesis: NA: Disney Interactive; EU: Sega; Game Boy; THQ
- Producers: Gaute Godager (Genesis); Dympna Forkin (Game Boy)
- Programmers: Carl-Henrik Skårstedt (Genesis); Chris Brunning (Game Boy)
- Artists: Ole-Petter Rosenlund (Genesis); Kevin Knott (Game Boy)
- Composers: Patrick Collins (Genesis); Mark Ortiz and John Prince (Game Boy)
- Platforms: Genesis, Game Boy
- Release: Genesis: NA: March 1996; EU: September 12, 1996; Game Boy: NA: June 10, 1996; EU: December 6, 1996
- Genre: Platform
- Mode: Single-player

Pocahontas is a 1996 platform game based on the 1995 animated film of the same name. The Genesis / Mega Drive version was developed by Funcom on contract with Disney and was released in March 1996. It was followed by a later version for the Game Boy developed by Tiertex Design Studios and released on June 10, 1996, nearly a year after the film's premiere. A Super Nintendo Entertainment System version of the game was under development, but was canceled due to development being too far behind to coincide with the Genesis release.

== Gameplay ==
In the game, the player plays as Pocahontas and Meeko, switching between the two frequently to overcome obstacles, with the help of Flit as an NPC. Along the way, the player gains various new abilities from various animal spirits by helping them. The game follows the plot of the film, but with many variations in situations and events.

== Reception ==
Reception

Review scores
| Publication | Score | |
| Publication | Game Boy | Sega Genesis |
|---|---|---|
| AllGame | 2.5/5 | 3/5 |
| Electronic Gaming Monthly | N/A | 7/10 |

Disney's Pocahontas for the Sega Genesis was met with a mixed reception upon its release. Critics praised the game's faithful adaptation of the Disney movie's visuals, noting the clean, vibrant graphics that effectively captured the look and feel of the animated film. Electronic Gaming Monthly highlighted the game's use of Disney's signature cel art style, which was a hallmark of the brand at the time. The game also garnered positive remarks for its incorporation of animal spirits to solve puzzles, a feature that added an engaging, albeit simplistic, layer of strategy. However, criticisms were raised about the game's control mechanics, which some found to be stiff and unresponsive. While GamePro found the gameplay to be accessible and enjoyable for younger players, it also noted that the game lacked the dynamic energy of other Disney titles like Aladdin, making the experience feel slower and less exciting for more seasoned gamers.

The challenge level of Pocahontas was another point of discussion, with some reviewers from Electronic Gaming Monthly pointing out that while the game could be addictive during a first play through, its replay value was limited. GamePro similarly categorized the game as appropriate for beginners, citing its easy puzzles and gentle difficulty curve, which might not satisfy players looking for more complex gameplay.
