= Pocahontas (1995 film) =

1995 American animated film

- Theatrical release poster
- Directed by: Mike Gabriel; Eric Goldberg
- Written by: Carl Binder; Susannah Grant; Philip LaZebnik
- Story by: Glen Keane; Joe Grant; Ralph Zondag; Burny Mattinson; Ed Gombert; Kaan Kalyon; Francis Glebas; Robert Gibbs; Bruce Morris; Todd Kurosawa; Duncan Marjoribanks; Chris Buck
- Produced by: James Pentecost
- Starring: Joe Baker; Christian Bale; Irene Bedard; Billy Connolly; James Apaumut Fall; Mel Gibson; Linda Hunt; John Kassir; Judy Kuhn; Danny Mann; Russell Means; David Ogden Stiers; Michelle St. John; Gordon Tootoosis; Frank Welker
- Edited by: H. Lee Peterson
- Music by: Alan Menken
- Production company: Walt Disney Feature Animation
- Distributed by: Buena Vista Pictures Distribution (Note: Distributed under the Walt Disney Pictures banner.)
- Release dates: June 10, 1995 (Central Park); June 23, 1995 (United States)
- Running time: 81 minutes
- Country: United States
- Language: English
- Budget: $55 million
- Box office: $346.1 million

Pocahontas is a 1995 American animated musical historical drama film loosely based on the life of Powhatan woman Pocahontas and the arrival of English settlers from the Virginia Company. It was directed by Mike Gabriel and Eric Goldberg from a screenplay written by Carl Binder, Susannah Grant and Philip LaZebnik. Produced by Walt Disney Feature Animation, the film romanticizes Pocahontas' encounter with John Smith and her legendary saving of his life.

The film stars the voices of Irene Bedard and Mel Gibson as Pocahontas and Smith, respectively, with David Ogden Stiers, Russell Means, Christian Bale, Michelle St. John, James Apaumut Fall, Billy Connolly, Joe Baker, Gordon Tootoosis and Linda Hunt in supporting roles. The score was composed by Alan Menken, who also wrote the film's songs with lyricist Stephen Schwartz.

After making his directorial debut with The Rescuers Down Under (1990), Gabriel conceived the film during a Thanksgiving weekend. Goldberg, who had just finished up work as the supervising animator of the Genie in Aladdin (1992), joined Gabriel as co-director. The project went into development concurrently with The Lion King (1994), and attracted most of Disney's top animators. Meanwhile, Disney studio chairman Jeffrey Katzenberg decided that the film should be an emotional romantic epic in the vein of Beauty and the Beast (1991), in hope that like Beauty, it would also be nominated for the Academy Award for Best Picture. Screenwriters Binder, Grant, and LaZebnik took creative liberties with history in an attempt to make the film palatable to audiences.

Pocahontas premiered at Central Park on June 10, 1995, and was released in the United States on June 23, to mixed reviews from critics, who praised its animation, voice performances, and music, but criticized its story with its lack of focus on tone. The film's historical inaccuracies and artistic license received polarized responses. Pocahontas grossed over $346 million at the box office, making it the fifth highest-grossing film of 1995. The film received two Academy Awards for Best Musical or Comedy Score for Menken and Best Original Song for "Colors of the Wind". According to critics, the depiction of Pocahontas as an empowered heroine influenced subsequent Disney films like Mulan (1998) and Frozen (2013). The film was followed by a direct-to-video sequel, Pocahontas II: Journey to a New World, in 1998.

== Plot ==
In 1607, the Susan Constant travels from London to the New World, carrying English settlers from the Virginia Company. The settlers, including Captain John Smith, talk of adventure, finding gold, fighting "Injuns" and potentially settling in the new land. They encounter a hurricane shortly after setting sail, during which a soldier named Thomas gets washed overboard while assisting John with the ship cannons. John Smith manages to save him by rappelling off the ship, but they narrowly escape when the rope breaks.

In the Powhatan tribe in Virginia, Pocahontas, the pretty young Native American daughter of Chief Powhatan, fears being possibly wed to Kocoum, a warrior whom she sees as "too serious" for her own free-spirited personality. After having a dream about a spinning arrow, Pocahontas visits Grandmother Willow, a talking willow tree who alerts her of the arriving English.

The voyage's leader Governor Ratcliffe, who seeks only wealth and status, has Jamestown built in a wooded clearing and immediately has the crewmen dig for gold, which he secretly plans to use to dethrone King James. John departs the activity to explore the wilderness and encounters Pocahontas. At first, she speaks to him in Powhatan, but he soon gains her trust. They quickly bond, fascinated by each other's worlds, and end up falling in love. After a skirmish between the settlers and natives, Powhatan orders the natives to stay away from the English, but Pocahontas disobeys him and keeps meeting with John. However, Pocahontas's friend, Nakoma, discovers their secret relationship and warns Kocoum. Ratcliffe also learns of John's encounters and stubbornly warns him against sparing any Natives.

Later, John and Pocahontas meet with Grandmother Willow and plan to bring peace between the colonists and the tribe. While both parties spy on the couple, John and Pocahontas share a kiss. Furious at the scene, Kocoum lets out a battle cry, attacks, and attempts to kill John, but Thomas, sent by Ratcliffe to follow John, shoots and kills Kocoum instead. John angrily orders Thomas to leave the scene before the tribesmen arrive to capture John and retrieve Kocoum's body. Enraged at Kocoum's death, Powhatan chastises Pocahontas for leaving the village, and declares war on the English, beginning with John's execution at dawn.

Returning to Jamestown, Thomas warns the settlers of John's capture. Overhearing Thomas's news, Ratcliffe then rallies his men to battle, using this as an excuse to annihilate the tribe and find their nonexistent gold. That same night, Powhatan also orders his men to prepare for battle. A desperate Pocahontas visits Grandmother Willow and realizes the arrow from John's compass is the same spinning arrow from her dream, which leads to her destiny. At dawn, Powhatan and his tribe drag John to a cliff for his execution. Meanwhile, Ratcliffe leads the armed colonists to fight Powhatan's warriors. Just as Powhatan is about to execute John and start the war, Pocahontas throws herself over John and finally convinces her father to end the fighting between the two groups and spare John's life. Both sides stand down and Powhatan releases John, but an unmoved Ratcliffe fires his musket at Powhatan. John takes the shot instead to save the chief, and the livid settlers turn on Ratcliffe for hurting their comrade.

John is nursed back to health by the tribe, but he must return to England for his wounds to fully heal. Ratcliffe is also sent back in chains to face punishment for his crimes against the settlement. John asks Pocahontas to come with him, but she chooses to stay with her tribe to help keep the peace. John leaves without Pocahontas, but with Powhatan's blessing to return anytime in the future and his gratitude for saving him from Ratcliffe. At the end, Pocahontas runs to the top of a cliff, where she watches the Susan Constant carrying John depart.

== Voice cast ==
- Irene Bedard as Pocahontas, a noble, free-spirited and highly spiritual young girl, and daughter of Chief Powhatan. She is a very adventurous person who defies her father's strict prohibition against meeting the English settlers, and falls in love with Captain John Smith.

- Judy Kuhn as the singing voice of Pocahontas.

- Mel Gibson as John Smith, the love interest of Pocahontas. He is the only settler in Jamestown willing to befriend the Natives, due to his love for Pocahontas, which makes him change his previously discriminatory point of view about other cultures.
- David Ogden Stiers as Governor Ratcliffe, the greedy and arrogant governor of the settlers who leads an expedition to Virginia to find gold and other riches that he wants to keep for himself.
  - Stiers also provided the voice of Wiggins, Ratcliffe's manservant. Unlike Ratcliffe, Wiggins is gentle and good-hearted.
- John Kassir as Meeko, Pocahontas's pet raccoon.
- Russell Means as Chief Powhatan, Pocahontas's father and chief of the Powhatan tribe who is, at first, distrustful of the English settlers, but eventually learns to make peace with them through his daughter.

- Jim Cummings provides the singing voice of Chief Powhatan.

- Christian Bale as Thomas, a loyal friend of John Smith who, like the other English settlers, is ordered by Ratcliffe to fire upon the Natives on sight, but eventually defies his orders.
- Billy Connolly as Ben, and Joe Baker as Lon, two settlers and friends of John Smith.
- Linda Hunt as Grandmother Willow, a speaking willow tree that acts as Pocahontas's guide in times of uncertainty.
- Danny Mann as Percy, Governor Ratcliffe's snooty and short-tempered pet pug who, at first, harbors animosity towards Meeko, but eventually befriends him and abandons his owner.
- Frank Welker as Flit, Pocahontas's feisty pet hummingbird who prefers Kocoum over John Smith but eventually befriends the latter.
- Michelle St. John as Nakoma, Pocahontas's best friend who is more easygoing in contrast to Pocahontas's adventurous spirit.
- James Apaumut Fall as Kocoum, a strong and brave but stern and aggressive Powhatan warrior whom Chief Powhatan wants Pocahontas to marry.
- Gordon Tootoosis as Kekata, the medicine man of the Powhatan.

- Jim Cummings provides the singing voice of Kekata.

Three actors in the film have been involved in other Pocahontas-related projects. Gordon Tootoosis acted as Chief Powhatan in Pocahontas: The Legend (1995). Christian Bale and Irene Bedard would portray John Rolfe and Pocahontas's mother, respectively, in Terrence Malick's The New World (2005).

== Production ==
=== Development ===
Following the release of The Rescuers Down Under (1990), director Mike Gabriel was eager to collaborate with veteran Disney story artist Joe Grant on a follow-up project that was vastly different from the animated adventure film. In April and May 1991, they first partnered on an adaptation of Swan Lake with both of them writing story outlines and creating conceptual artwork. Gabriel and Grant then submitted their outline for approval, but it was negatively received by the studio's live-action script readers. Earlier, during Thanksgiving weekend, 1990, Gabriel had wanted to direct an animated musical set in the American West. At a relative's Thanksgiving dinner, while glancing through numerous titles in their bookcase, Gabriel struck on the idea of adapting the life of Pocahontas after finding a book about her. Following the cancellation of Swan Lake, Gabriel returned to the idea.

Shortly after, Gabriel pitched his idea at the "Gong Show" meeting held by Michael Eisner, Jeffrey Katzenberg, Peter Schneider and Roy E. Disney. He had written the title Walt Disney's Pocahontas on an image of Tiger Lily from Peter Pan (1953) to the back of which he taped a brief pitch that read "an Indian princess who is torn between her father's wishes to destroy the English settlers and her wishes to help them – a girl caught between her father and her people, and her love for the enemy." Coincidentally, Feature Animation president Peter Schneider had been developing an animated version of William Shakespeare's play Romeo and Juliet, and observed several similarities between his idea and Gabriel's Pocahontas pitch; Schneider recalled: "We were particularly interested in exploring the theme of 'If we don't learn to live with one another, we will destroy ourselves.'" Gabriel's pitch was quickly accepted, becoming the quickest story turnaround in Disney studio history.

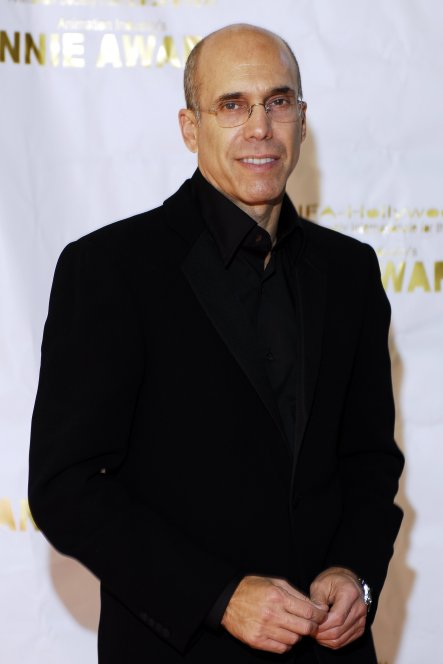
Jeffrey Katzenberg hoped that Pocahontas would be nominated for the Academy Award for Best Picture.

After Beauty and the Beast (1991) was unprecedentedly nominated for an Academy Award for Best Picture at the 64th Academy Awards, then-studio chairman Jeffrey Katzenberg opted to produce another animated romance film in the hopes of achieving a similar feat. While Aladdin (1992) and The Lion King (1994) were considered to be too far into development, Katzenberg deemed Pocahontas a promising candidate, and thus pushed for the heroine to be older, the romance between her and Smith to be more mature, and the animals to be mute. Head of story Tom Sito went on the record stating he wanted to include "broader" jokes, but the "higher-ups wanted it more winsome, more gentle. Some of the folks were so concerned about political correctness, they didn't want to be cuckoo-wacky about it."

Eric Goldberg—following his contributions to Aladdin as the supervising animator of the Genie and with all animation units for The Lion King already occupied—was asked to co-direct Pocahontas alongside Gabriel, to which he agreed. Likewise, he had originally expected the film to be more comedic and cartoonish like Aladdin, but Schneider informed him that the film would be produced in a vein more similar to that of Beauty and the Beast; the then-ongoing 1992 Los Angeles riots further convinced Goldberg to commit to the film due to its racial themes. However, executive interference would grow so much that Goldberg himself decided to work for Chuck Jones Productions under the pseudonym "Claude Raynes" during production. It eventually reached a peak when Joe Grant drew Percy wearing a Native American feather, by which the animators took the concept one step further by placing a Spanish ruff on Meeko. One executive exclaimed, "Animals don't have the intelligence to switch their clothes! They don't even have opposing thumbs." The animators would retain their concept for the film.

Under Katzenberg, Frank Wells, and Michael Eisner, the Disney studios had begun a correlation of hiring Broadway personnel to manage the Disney animation staff on their feature films that brought such producers as Amy Pell to Aladdin and Sarah McArthur and Thomas Schumacher to The Lion King. Before making his producing debut on Pocahontas, James Pentecost had earlier worked as a production stage manager on several Broadway productions including La Cage aux Folles and Crimes of the Heart.

In June 1992, the filmmakers embarked on a research trip to the Jamestown Settlement where Pentecost first met Shirley "Little Dove" Custalow-McGowan and Debbie "White Dove" Custalow, both descendants of the Powhatan Native Americans. The trip also included a visit to the Pamunkey Indian Reservation, and conducted interviews with historians at Old Dominion University. Following the research trip, Custalow-McGowan served as a consultant traveling to the Disney studios three times, and while Custalow-McGowan offered her services for free, Disney paid her a $500 daily consulting fee plus expenses. Ultimately, when it came to light that historical accuracy was not being pursued to the extent she had hoped, McGowan voiced her feelings of shame she felt in conjunction with her work on the film, saying "[she] wish[ed her] name wasn't on it". Additional Native American consultants were brought in to authenticate the clothing and war dance choreography. That same month, Katzenberg held a meeting with the Feature Animation staff in which he predicted that Pocahontas would be a commercial hit, while deeming The Lion King experimental and less likely to succeed. As a result, most of the animators of Walt Disney Feature Animation decided to work on Pocahontas instead, believing it would be the more prestigious and successful of the two.

=== Writing ===
In January 1993, Carl Binder joined the project, having previous expertise as a television writer on shows such as Punky Brewster, War of the Worlds, Friday the 13th: The Series, and Top Cops. Four months later, Susannah Grant and Philip LaZebnik joined the writing team. Susannah Grant was selected by Disney as a screenwriter on Pocahontas after winning the Nicholl Fellowships in Screenwriting awarded by the Academy of Motion Picture Arts and Sciences the year before while still attending film school. On board as a screenwriter, she was only one of the many who was contributing the specific vision the upper management at Disney had in mind, and collaborated with Native American consultants. While working on the film, Susannah Grant wrote to a specific story outline, and no scene was rewritten fewer than thirty-five times until she felt it was perfect.

Story supervisor Tom Sito, who became the project's unofficial historical consultant, did extensive research into the early colonial era and the story of John Smith and Pocahontas, but was confronted over the historical inaccuracies by historians. Already knowing that in reality, Pocahontas married John Rolfe, Gabriel explained it was felt that "the story of Pocahontas and Rolfe was too complicated and violent for a youthful audience" so instead, they would focus on Pocahontas's meeting with John Smith. The filmmakers discovered that Pocahontas was around twelve years old and Smith was "not a very likeable character", in which producer James Pentecost confessed that dramatic license was needed to be taken. Likewise, when searching for an appropriate age for Pocahontas to begin her relationship with Smith, Glen Keane explained, "We had the choice of being historically accurate or socially responsible, so we chose the socially responsible side" by increasing Pocahontas's age from a girl into a young woman.

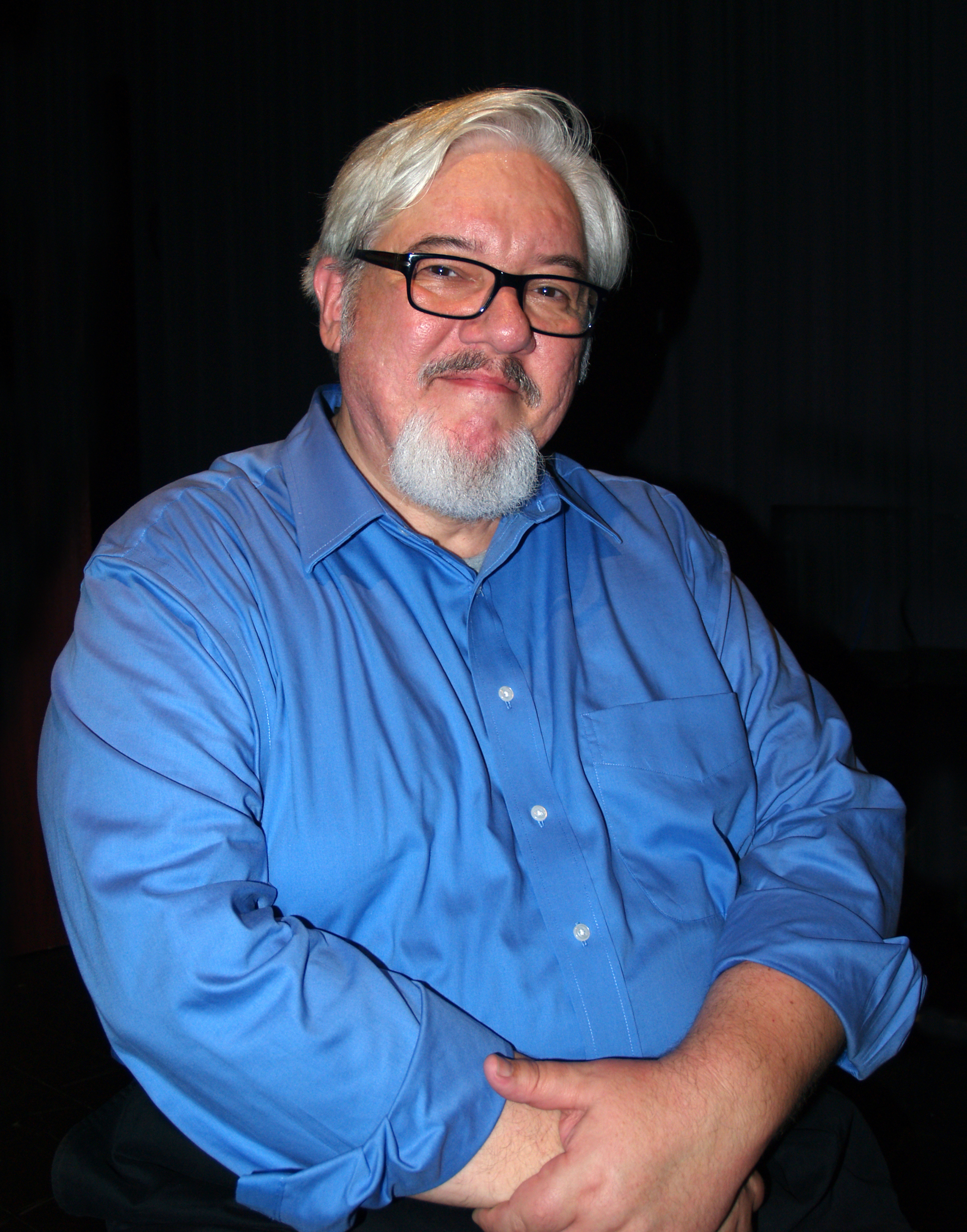
Tom Sito served as the story supervisor.

One of Gabriel's early ideas was for Pocahontas's mother to be embodied in a certain star in the sky that would help Pocahontas find her path to Smith. The Lion King however had concurrently carried a similar idea of the ancestors giving wisdom and guidance to the protagonist so the idea was discarded. Michael Eisner pushed for Pocahontas to have a mother, lamenting that "We're always getting fried for having no mothers." The writers countered that Powhatan was polygamous and formed dynastic alliances among other neighboring tribes by impregnating a local woman and giving away the child, so it was believed that Pocahontas herself probably did not see her mother that much. "Well", Eisner conceded, "I guess that means we're toasted." Ultimately, her mother's spirit would become the swirling wind that occurs throughout the film.

For the villain, they chose John Ratcliffe, whose portrayal was based on actual English captains, including John Martin, Christopher Newport, and Edward Maria Wingfield. In reality, it was Wingfield who despised John Smith, but the filmmakers preferred the sinister sound of "Ratcliffe". The writers tried to adapt actual events from Pocahontas's life into the film such as her warning Smith that the Native Americans were after him so he could escape in the middle of the night, Powhatan ordering the captured Smith to make bead necklaces to humiliate him, and Pocahontas being captured by Ratcliffe (instead of Samuel Argall), though none of them worked with the story.

Sito mentioned that Joe Grant contributed heavily towards the film, as he was the creator of Redfeather, Meeko, and Flit. Redfeather was a wise-cracking turkey who was intended to be voiced by John Candy, and Percy, who was to be voiced by Richard E. Grant, was revised to become mute. Following the death of John Candy in March 1994, co-screenwriter Susannah Grant decided the turkey was inappropriate for the script she co-wrote for Pocahontas, and a more realistic approach would have the animals pantomime instead of talking. Joe Grant stated Redfeather "had comic potential–he thought he was handsome, a lady's man. When we decided he couldn't talk, and, having no hands, he couldn't mime ...".

Joe Grant would later draw a concept sketch of a hair-braiding raccoon, which Glen Keane animated and claimed the directors "loved the idea and got rid of the turkey character." Similarly, according to Sito, Meeko was created because raccoons were "naturally enigmatic, because they have little hands and a little mask over their face like a thief." Gabriel described the inspiration for Flit the hummingbird from having "hummingbirds all over my backyard, [and] I thought, 'That's a great animal to animate.'" According to the directors, Governor Ratcliffe's pampered pet, Percy, was based on history as the royalty of the time often carried small pugs wherever they went.

For the spiritual ancestor, a male character named Old Man River was originally envisioned, and Gregory Peck was cast in the role. Peck later realized that the character ought to be a maternal figure and reluctantly turned down the role. Conceived as a tree of life whose seasonal changes would frame the story, Grandmother Willow grew out of a concept sketch of a sawed-off tree with a branch pointing to its rings drawn by Joe Grant, which would serve as a narrator that would "remember back to Pocahontas 300 years earlier". Joe Grant would continue to protest to have the tree be more a character within the story, and her character flowered into the idea of a grandmotherly spiritual adviser to Pocahontas. Because of Katzenberg's opposition to having Grandmother Willow in the story, Joe Grant assisted fellow veteran story artist Burny Mattinson with coming up with tree puns such as "My bark is worse than my bite", "The roots of all problems", and "They're barking up the wrong tree." Mattinson reluctantly added them to his pitch for the next morning, and during the story meeting, he exclaimed, "Everybody loved it! All of a sudden: 'Oh, I want her in!' 'Let's build her part bigger!'"

=== Casting ===
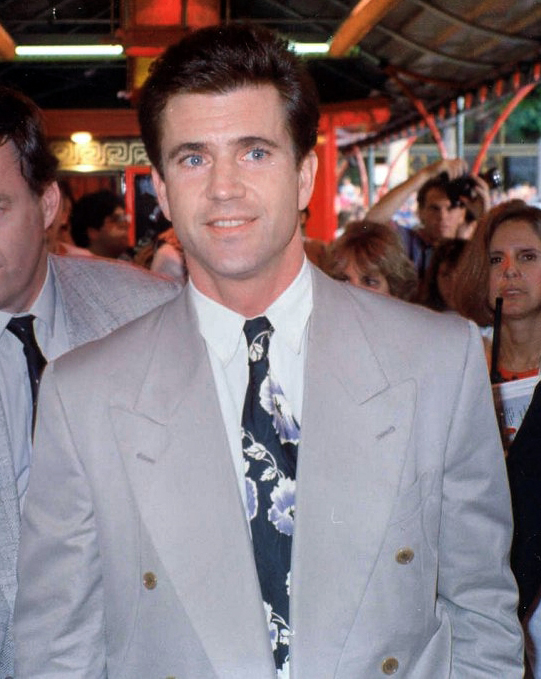
Mel Gibson provided the singing and speaking voices of John Smith.

In September 1992, Disney began casting actors for Pocahontas telling talent agents that they were particularly interested in Native American actors for the project. For the role of Pocahontas, Broadway actress-singer Judy Kuhn was hired to provide the singing voice for the eponymous character before Irene Bedard was cast. Kuhn explained "They said, 'You are going to do the dialogue unless we find a Native American actress whose singing voice matched yours.' I was cast before Irene, so it actually went backwards." Bedard herself was filming Lakota Woman: Siege at Wounded Knee (1994) where she was informed by the casting director that they were looking for someone to voice the title role. According to Bedard, she took a train to Buffalo, New York, where she walked in wearing a sundress and a straw hat, and read for the part. Back on the set of Lakota Woman, she learned that she was cast in the role. Michelle St. John had also auditioned for the role of Pocahontas, and was given the role of Nakoma after Bedard was cast.

Mel Gibson was cast as English settler John Smith following a desire to make "something for my kids." In a notable contrast to previous voice actors for Disney animated features, Gibson provided the singing voice for his character, which the actor has described as the most difficult part of his role.

Christian Bale auditioned for the role of Thomas. As he explained in an interview with Disney Adventures, "the directors played with Thomas being Irish and Scottish and younger than I am, so I had to raise my voice and do different accents. But the more we did it, the more he became like me–older and English." Richard White, the voice of Gaston in Beauty and the Beast, was supposed to voice Ratcliffe, but the crew was worried he might sound too much like Gaston, so he was replaced by his co-star David Ogden Stiers, who also voices Ratcliffe's dimwitted assistant Wiggins. Robbie Coltrane and Chris Barrie were brought in to read for Ratcliffe, while Goldberg wanted Hugh Laurie to play Wiggins.

Russell Means was cast as Chief Powhatan, though he initially expressed displeasure with the script in that Native Americans addressed each other using proper names rather than the traditional "my father" or "my friend". Indigenous Canadian actor Gordon Tootoosis was also cast as the tribal medicine man Kekata. Throughout most of the production, the cast members performed their dialogue in separate recording sessions.

=== Design and animation ===
This portrait engraving of Pocahontas by Simon de Passe served as one of the many inspirations for the look of the title character.

Renowned for his animation of Ariel in The Little Mermaid (1989), supervising animator Glen Keane was immediately tapped to draw the titular Native American princess. Following the demands of Jeffrey Katzenberg to make the title character "the most idealized and finest woman ever made", Keane first sought his inspirations for his depictions of Pocahontas from Shirley 'Little Dove' Custalow-McGowan and Devi White Dove, women he had met during the research trip to Virginia. Keane recalled meeting the women:

So I turned around and there's this beautiful Indian woman walking up; a Native American. She said 'Are you Glen Keane? The animator that's going to do Pocahontas?' I said 'Well, yeah.' And then from behind another tree another woman came up and she said, 'Well, my name is Shirley Little Dove, and this is my sister Devi White Dove, and we are descended from Pocahontas.' And as they stood there, I mean I took a picture of both of them, and between their faces was Pocahontas' face in my mind – I could see her.

Other inspirations were Natalie Belcon, Naomi Campbell, Jamie Pillow, supermodel Kate Moss, Charmaine Craig, Christy Turlington, Dyna Taylor, and her own voice actress Irene Bedard. For almost three years, Taylor herself sat for four three-hour modeling sessions in which she was videotaped so the animators could draw poses of her from different angles. Keane also looked to a 1620 depiction of Pocahontas from a history book, though he would state the depiction was "not exactly a candidate for People's 'Most Beautiful' issue [so] I made a few adjustments to add an Asian feeling to her face." Due to the complexity of the color schemes, shapes, and expressions in the animation, a total of 55 animators worked on the animation of Pocahontas's character alone, including Mark Henn and Pres Romanillos.

After working at Sullivan-Bluth Studios for over fourteen years, John Pomeroy, who notoriously resigned alongside Don Bluth during work on The Fox and the Hound (1981) in 1979, returned to Disney and worked on the film. Pomeroy noted that initially John Smith was portrayed as well-groomed before the animators tried designs where the character was "sloppier", bearded, and carried daggers and knives. Pomeroy grew more satisfied with the character's design the more simple it became. Additionally, Pomeroy cited inspiration for John Smith from Errol Flynn and the facial features of Gibson.

Initially assigned as a supervising animator on The Lion King, Nik Ranieri did character designs and test animation for Timon, but moved over to Pocahontas growing frustrated with an indecisive vision from the directors. There, he was assigned to animate Redfeather until Jeffrey Katzenberg ordered that the animals be mute. Finding feathers difficult for Redfeather to gesture with, he was again assigned to animate Meeko using a Little Golden Books animal book illustrated by Alice and Martin Provensen as reference. Duncan Marjoribanks utilized geometric shapes to create Ratcliffe. In early drafts of the character, he had a body similar to a pear, but to make him appear more arrogant, the animator increased the force of gravity on his chest so that he seemed more pompous and physically threatening. Chris Buck served as the supervising animator for Percy, Wiggins, and Grandmother Willow. For Grandmother Willow, the face was traditionally animated by Buck, while the cowl and the trunk of the tree were digitally animated under the supervision of Steve Goldberg. Assisted by the effect animators, a 3D software program was employed for the bark to be individually manipulated and for the face to match with the computer-generated texture. The following supervising animators also included Anthony DeRosa for Nakoma, Michael Cedeno for Kocoum, Ken Duncan for Thomas, T. Daniel Hofstedt for the settlers Lon and Ben, and Dave Pruiksma for Flit. Glen Keane used charcoal to animate a scene in the Colors of the Wind sequence, with colors added later. While Mulan (1998) was within its pre-production stages, 18 minutes were animated by 170 animators and artists at the Disney-MGM Studios.

Initially, Gabriel asked Michael Giaimo to create conceptual paintings for the film as they both shared in a style of shape-based and secondary art details. Giaimo, himself a former assistant animator and then a CalArts teacher, accepted, working several months on a freelance basis. After Goldberg became the film's co-director, the two directors asked Giaimo to officially join the staff, in which he was promoted to being the film's art director. For Giaimo, he relied on color-saturated, elegant designs in a less-than-realistic format inspired by "prehistory Caribbean themes and creatures derived from Mexican and African folk art." Giaimo also sought out inspiration for the visual design from the works produced by earlier Disney art designers such as Richard Kelsey (who had done story sketches for his unproduced film Hiawatha), Eyvind Earle, who worked on Sleeping Beauty (1959), and Mary Blair.

=== Music ===
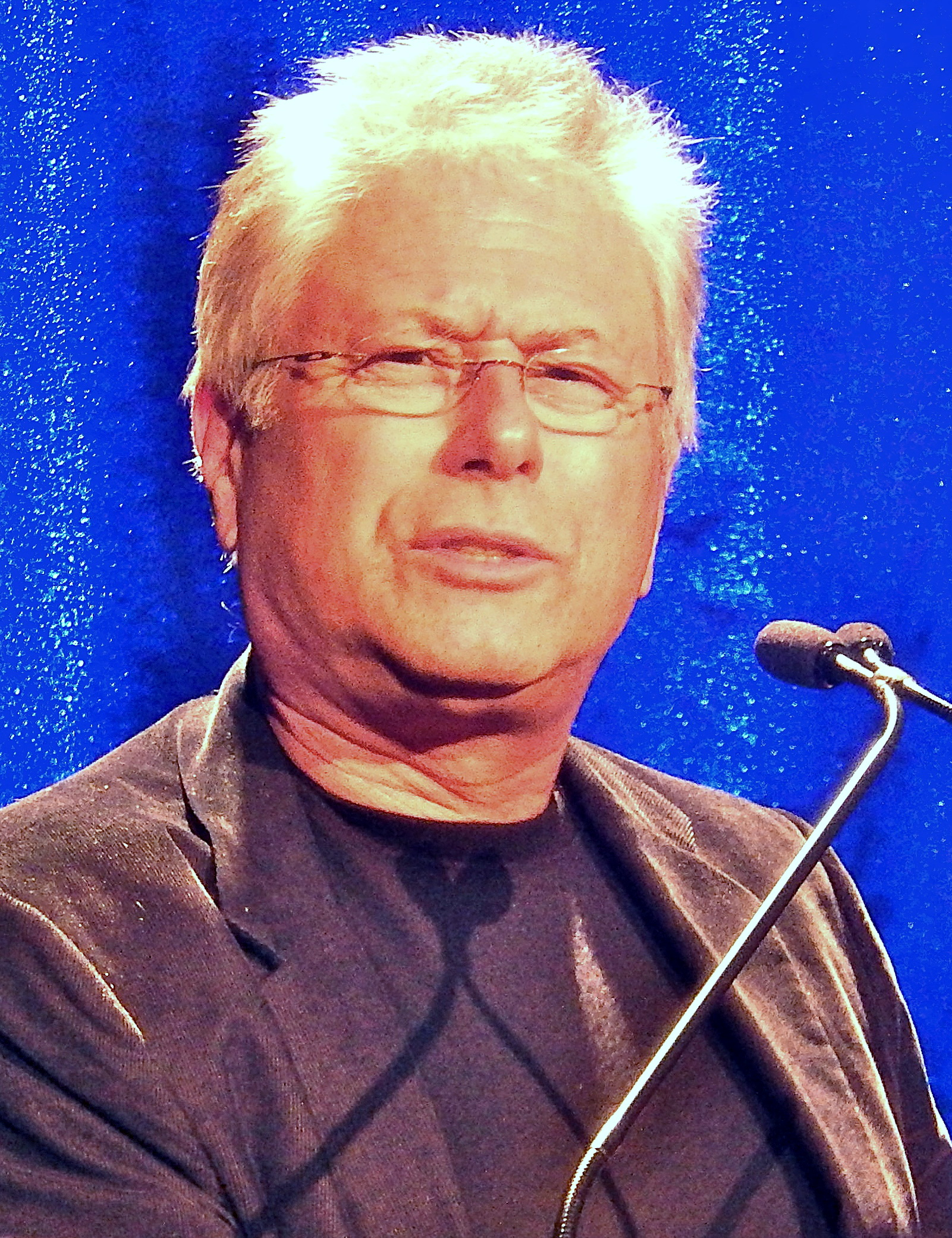
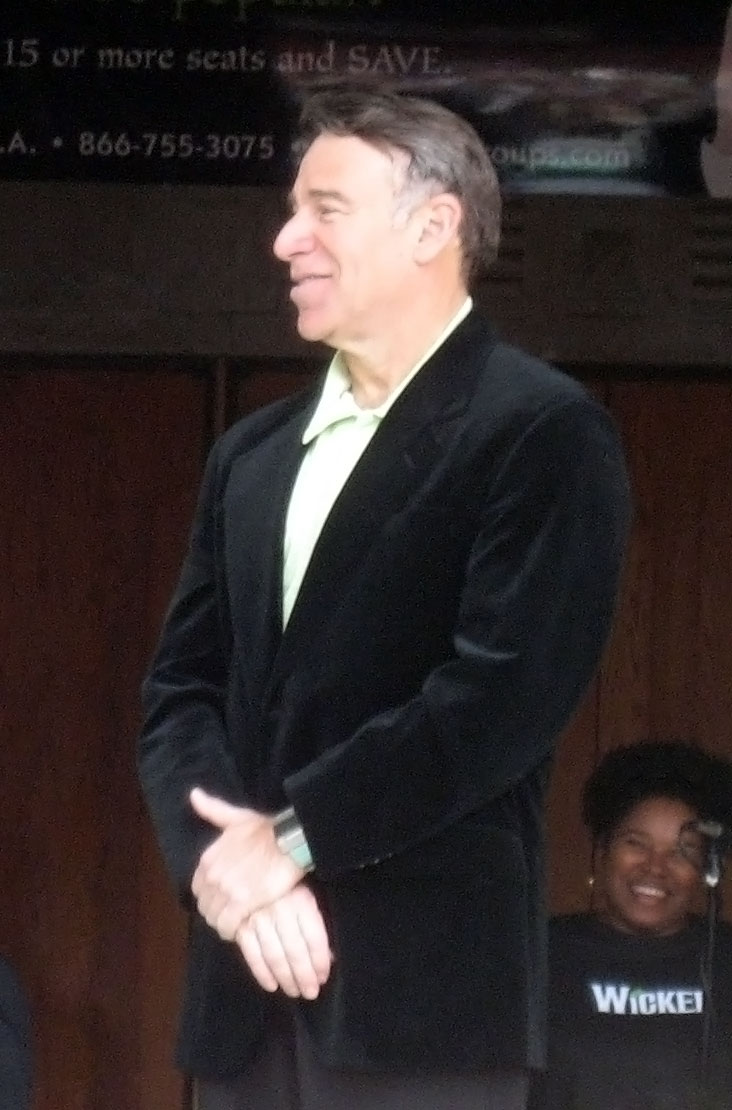
Alan Menken (pictured on left) wrote the film's score and songs.
Stephen Schwartz (pictured on right) wrote the film's song lyrics.

Howard Ashman and Alan Menken were planning to write songs for Pocahontas once they were finished working on Aladdin, but Ashman died in 1991. Following the death of his longtime collaborator, Menken wrote the remaining songs for Aladdin with Tim Rice at his home in London, which the New York-based composer found to be difficult. When Aladdin was finished, Menken was expected to write songs for Pocahontas with Rice. Kevin Bannerman, the studio's director of development, stated Rice "was always gallivanting around the world and it was difficult to get him and Alan together ... And so here was Stephen [Schwartz], who had written scores that we all loved and we were huge fans of, and he lived in the New York area." Disney immediately contacted Stephen Schwartz, who, after working on Working, Rags, and Children of Eden, had quit theater and was taking psychology courses at New York University; he was hired to write the lyrics. This would mark the first time Menken had collaborated without Ashman for a Disney animated film. Menken commented that their work included moments of tension because Schwartz was also capable of writing music and Menken had experience with lyrics.

Due to corporate interest in the film surrounding its theme of promoting understanding between different groups, and its inclusion of violence and threats of greater conflict, Schwartz became heavily involved in the storytelling. Bannerman estimated that he spent a week with one of the screenwriters and helped work out the overall themes of tolerance and cooperation. In June 1992, Schwartz researched Jamestown, Virginia where he absorbed the atmosphere and bought tapes of Native American music and English sea shanties, as well as other music from the early 17th century that helped inspire numbers in the film. Schwartz modeled his lyrical writing for people of other ethnicities on that of Oscar Hammerstein II and Sheldon Harnick. "Colors of the Wind" was the first song to be written for the film. Gabriel, Goldberg, and Pentecost stated the song had defined the film's "heart and soul". Schwartz began "Colors" with a few draft ideas for lyrics taking inspiration from Chief Seattle's letter to the United States Congress. Then, Menken wrote the melody with Schwartz listening at the piano and making suggestions. Schwartz would add lyrics before a session together where they were refined.

"Just Around the Riverbend", also composed by Menken and Schwartz, was devised by Schwartz's wife Carole, with the idea that Pocahontas would have a recurring dream that suggested something coming her way, paving the way for her "I Want" song. The song almost did not make it into the completed film when Disney executives doubted whether her song would have the kind of impact they wanted at that point. Schwartz however stated he and Menken "believed in it very strongly. Indeed, at one point we wrote a different song for that spot, but Alan and I were never as happy with the second song and ultimately everybody at Disney came to feel that way, too."

The filmmakers had planned for a song for when Pocahontas and Smith met in the glade, just before Kocoum attacks Smith. There were an estimated three to four songs at this point, including "Different Drummer", "In the Middle of the River", "First to Dance", which was deemed too silly as it took place before Kocoum's death, and "Powerful Magic", which was another attempt at a cheerful song. A love song, titled "If I Never Knew You", had been finished by the animators, but following a test screening where child and teen audiences were not interested in the song as it played, Menken suggested that the song be removed. It was, although its melody remained in the orchestral underscoring. The soundtrack was successful, reaching number-one on the Billboard 200 charts during the week of July 22, 1995. It received a triple platinum certification.

== Release ==
=== Marketing ===
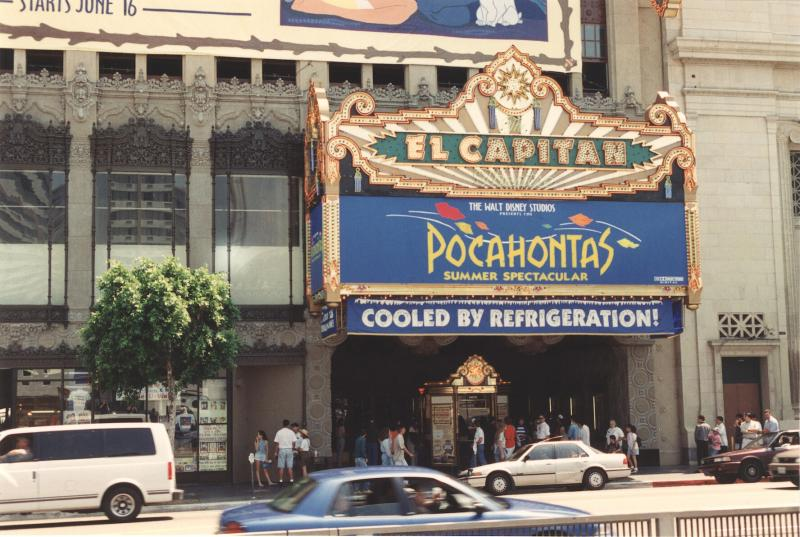
Pocahontas playing at the El Capitan Theatre in Los Angeles, California

To replicate the promotional buzz of The Lion King, the four-minute musical number, "Colors of the Wind", was released in November 1994, accompanying a theatrical re-release of The Lion King. On February 3, 1995, Disney began its promotional marketing campaign starting in San Diego, California, launching a nationwide 18-week tour of fashion malls located within twenty-five cities where a mall exhibit named Pocahontas Animation Discovery Adventure was created to help promote the release. There, a Disney animator would guide shoppers on a presentation tour, which featured a walk-through maze with interactive lily pads, flying birds, and huge video wall, a studio workshop where visitors can become the voice of their favorite animated character, and an area where visitors can electronically manipulate images. Additionally, they would demonstrate animation techniques and discuss the design and creation of Pocahontas's character. Further promotional tie-ins included Burger King distributing 55 million toy replicas of the characters with kids' meals, Payless Shoes selling a line of moccasins, and Mattel peddling a Barbie-like Pocahontas doll.

A behind-the-scenes documentary television special titled The Making of Pocahontas: A Legend Comes to Life aired on the Disney Channel on June 11, 1995, where the animators, voice cast, crew, and studio heads were interviewed on the production of the film. The special was hosted by actress Irene Bedard.

The film had the largest premiere in history, on June 10, 1995, in New York's Central Park, followed by a live performance by Vanessa Williams. Disney officials estimated the crowd at 100,000. The premiere's attendees included then-New York Mayor Rudy Giuliani, Caroline Kennedy, Mariah Carey and Michael Eisner.

=== Home media ===
At first announced to be released on March 6, 1996, Pocahontas was first released on VHS and LaserDisc in the United States on February 28, 1996, under the "Masterpiece Collection" lineup. A deluxe VHS edition included supplemental features such as a making-of documentary, alongside a special edition of The Art of Pocahontas book and Disney-certified lithograph prints. On November 13, 1996, the CAV laserdisc Deluxe Edition contained the film, a historical documentary on Pocahontas, and The Making of Pocahontas, along with added storyboards, character design artwork, concept art, rough animation, publicity and promotional trailers, the deleted "If I Never Knew You" musical sequence, and an audio commentary on a total of four double sided discs. The release was also accompanied with a Special Edition of the Art of Pocahontas book. Disney initially shipped 17 million VHS copies to retail stores, with nine million copies sold within its first weekend. It became the eighth-best-selling video of 1996 in the United States. By mid-1998, the operating income of the VHS release had accumulated to $250 million in worldwide sales.

In January 2000, Walt Disney Home Video launched the Walt Disney Gold Classic Collection, with Pocahontas re-issued on VHS and DVD on June 6, 2000. The DVD contained the film in its 1.66:1 aspect ratio enhanced with 5.1 surround sound, and was accompanied with special features including two music videos, a trivia game, the theatrical trailer, and a "Fun with Nature" activity booklet. Five years later, the film was remastered for a THX-certified 10th Anniversary 2-disc Special Edition DVD, which was released on May 3, 2005. This release features two versions of the film, which are a new extended cut with two performances of "If I Never Knew You" and the original theatrical version.

On August 21, 2012, Walt Disney Studios Home Entertainment released Pocahontas, alongside its sequel Pocahontas II: Journey to a New World, on Blu-ray Disc as a 2-Movie Collection. Pocahontas was re-released yet again on March 15, 2016, as a Blu-ray, DVD and Digital HD combo pack, available exclusively through the Disney Movie Club. It featured brand-new cover art, and, for the first time, a digital copy download of the film alongside the physical release.

== Reception ==
=== Box office ===
Timed with Pocahontas's 400th birthday, Pocahontas had a limited release in North America on June 16, 1995, playing in only six selected theaters in Chicago, Boston, Atlanta, Detroit, St. Louis and Los Angeles. The film grossed $2.7 million during its first weekend, standing at the eighth place in the box office ranking. It beat the record set by The Lion King the previous year for the highest-grossing opening weekend on fewer than 50 screens, a record that has not been beaten. The wide release followed on June 23, 1995, in 2,596 screens. Studio estimates initially anticipated Pocahontas earning $30.5 million, ranking first and beating out the previous box office champion Batman Forever (1995). The figure was later revised to $28.8 million with Pocahontas falling second behind Batman Forever. The final estimates placed Pocahontas narrowly ranking first grossing $29.5 million in its first weekend with Batman Forever falling into second place taking $29.2 million.

By January 1996, the film grossed $141.5 million in the United States, being the fourth-highest-grossing film in North America of 1995, behind Apollo 13, Toy Story, and Batman Forever. Overseas, the film was projected to gross $225 million, though foreign box office grosses eventually amounted to $204.5 million. Cumulatively, Pocahontas grossed $346.1 million worldwide. Although at the time it was seen as a commercial box office disappointment in comparison to The Lion King, in January 1996, then-Disney CEO Michael Eisner contested in an annual shareholders' meeting that "Pocahontas is well on its way to being one of our most successful films of all time. It has equalled Beauty and the Beast's box office numbers domestically, and now it has taken Europe by storm and is playing well in every country in which it is being shown. Sales of Pocahontas merchandise have been phenomenal."

=== Critical response ===
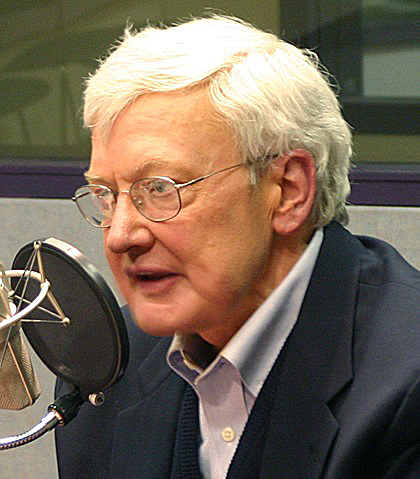
Roger Ebert deemed Pocahontas inferior to previous Disney Renaissance films.

Pocahontas received mixed reviews from film critics. The review aggregation website Rotten Tomatoes reports that 59% of critics gave the film a positive review based on 116 reviews, with an average score of 6.4/10. The site's consensus states "Pocahontas means well, and has moments of startling beauty, but it's largely a bland, uninspired effort, with uneven plotting and an unfortunate lack of fun." It is the only film from the Disney Renaissance to be classified as "rotten" on the site. Metacritic, which assigns a normalized rating out of 100 from top reviews from mainstream critics, calculated a score of 58 based on 23 reviews, indicating "mixed or average reviews". Audiences polled by CinemaScore gave the film an average grade of "A−" on an A+ to F scale.

Roger Ebert of the Chicago Sun-Times gave the film 3 out of 4 stars, writing that Pocahontas was "the best-looking of the modern Disney animated features, and one of the more thoughtful" though he was more critical of the story and portrayal of the villain, ultimately summarizing that "on a list including Mermaid, Beauty, Aladdin and Lion King, I'd rank it fifth. It has a lot of good intentions, but a severe scoundrel shortage." On the television program Siskel & Ebert, Ebert repeated the same sentiment, while his partner Gene Siskel was more praising of the film. Both critics gave the film a "Thumbs Up". In his print review for the Chicago Tribune, Siskel awarded the film 3 1/2 stars out of 4, stating it is a "surprisingly serious, thoughtful and beautifully drawn Disney animated feature about the American birthright of exploitation and racism". He praised it for "sending powerful images to children about threats to the natural order", restoring "a certain majesty to the Indian culture", and for having "the courage that leads to the life-goes-on ending." Eleanor Ringel Cater of The Atlanta Journal-Constitution gave the film a scoring of four stars, stating that "they say God is in the details. So, in this case, is the spirit of Uncle Walt. Pocahontas is a triumph for all involved. And it's also the most romantic movie this side of The Bridges of Madison County."

The film's writing and lack of humor received mixed reviews. Owen Gleiberman of Entertainment Weekly stated: "With dismay, I realize that virtually everything in the movie – every character, every story twist, every song – is as generic as the two hygienic lovers. As a fairy-tale confection, a kind of West Side Story in Jamestown, Pocahontas is pleasant to look at, and it will probably satisfy very small kiddies, but it's the first of the new-era Disney cartoons that feels less than animated". Peter Travers of Rolling Stone bemoaned that there were "no funny, fast-talking animals – Meeko the raccoon and Flit the hummingbird remain silent pals to Pocahontas and make you miss the verbal fun that Nathan Lane's wisecracking meerkat brought to The Lion King". Desson Howe, reviewing for The Washington Post, likewise criticized the writing as recycling "elements from Snow White to The Lion King, with a father-child clash, a heroine's saintly pureness that transforms an entire people, a forbidden love, consultations with an oracle/shaman (in this case a tree spirit, voiced by Linda Hunt) and the usual sideshow of funny, fuzzy animals". While calling the screenplay the "film's weakest element", Janet Maslin of The New York Times summarized in her review: "Gloriously colorful, cleverly conceived and set in motion with the usual Disney vigor, Pocahontas is one more landmark feat of animation. It does everything a children's movie should do except send little viewers home humming its theme song". David Hepworth of Empire Magazine gave the film 3 stars out of 5, and said "Not only historically dubious, but the dullest Disney animation for years".

In the Los Angeles Times, Angela Aleiss said that Pocahontas and other portrayals of the Native princess rarely show her having anything more important in her life than her relationships with men. Professor and Director of Indigenous Nations Studies Cornel Pewewardy argues that the film presents damaging stereotypes of the Native American population. Pewewardy feels that the representation of Native characters, like Grandmother Willow, Meeko, and Flit, as animals, has a marginalizing effect. Anthropologist Kiyomi Kutsuzawa also observed that in the film, Kocoum and John Smith fight for Pocahontas's affection. Kutsuzawa viewed Smith's victory over Kocoum in this arena as symbolic of Western Europe's domination of the Americas and white men's domination over men of color.

Conversely, Native American activist Russell Means, who portrays Chief Powhatan in the film, praised the film's racial overtones, stating that "Pocahontas is the first time Eurocentric male society has admitted its historical deceit", and that it makes the "stunning admission" that the purpose of the European colonization of the Americas was "to kill Indians and rape and pillage the land". Means also said that the film marked "the first time, other than on Northern Exposure, that a human face has been put on an Indian female", dubbing Pocahontas "the finest feature film on American Indians Hollywood has turned out". Sophie Gilbert of The Atlantic concurred, stating that the film's narrative "had a progressive attitude when it came to interpreting history", portraying the settlers as "plunderers searching for non-existent gold who were intent upon murdering the 'heathen savages' they encountered in the process", although she criticized the depiction of Pocahontas as stereotypical.

=== Accolades ===
List of awards and nominations
Award	Category	Nominee(s)	Result	Ref.
Academy Awards	Best Original Musical or Comedy Score	Music and Orchestral Score by Alan Menken; Lyrics by Stephen Schwartz	Won	
Academy Awards	Best Original Song	"Colors of the Wind"; Music by Alan Menken; Lyrics by Stephen Schwartz	Won	
Annie Awards	Best Animated Feature		Won	
Annie Awards	Best Individual Achievement in Animation	Chris Buck (Supervising Animator for "Grandmother Willow")	Nominated	
Annie Awards	Best Individual Achievement in Animation	David Pruiksma (Supervising Animator for "Flit")	Nominated	
Annie Awards	Best Individual Achievement in Animation	Nik Ranieri (Supervising Animator for "Meeko")	Won	
Annie Awards	Best Achievement in Music	Composer: Alan Menken; Lyricist: Stephen Schwartz	Won	
Annie Awards	Best Achievement in Production Design	Rasoul Azadani (Layout Artistic Supervisor)	Nominated	
Annie Awards	Best Achievement in Production Design	Michael Giaimo (Art Director)	Won	
Artios Awards	Outstanding Achievement in Animated Voice-Over Casting	Brian Chavanne and Ruth Lambert	Won	
ASCAP Film and Television Music Awards	Top Box Office Films	Stephen Schwartz	Won	
ASCAP Film and Television Music Awards	Most Performed Songs from Motion Pictures	"Colors of the Wind"; Music by Alan Menken; Lyrics by Stephen Schwartz	Won	
BMI Film & TV Awards	Film Music Award	Alan Menken	Won	
Environmental Media Awards	Best Feature Film		Won	
Golden Globe Awards	Best Original Score – Motion Picture	Alan Menken	Nominated	
Golden Globe Awards	Best Original Song – Motion Picture	"Colors of the Wind"; Music by Alan Menken; Lyrics by Stephen Schwartz	Won	
Golden Reel Awards	Best Sound Editing – Music (Animated)	Kathleen Fogarty-Bennett	Won	
Golden Screen Awards			Won	
Grammy Awards	Best Female Pop Vocal Performance	"Colors of the Wind" – Vanessa Williams	Nominated	
Grammy Awards	Best Musical Album for Children	Pocahontas Sing-Along – Various Artists	Nominated	
Grammy Awards	Best Song Written Specifically for a Motion Picture or for Television	"Colors of the Wind" – Alan Menken and Stephen Schwartz	Won	
Young Artist Awards	Best Family Feature – Musical or Comedy		Nominated	

== Historical accuracy ==
Pocahontas's real name was Matoaka (probably also her mother's name) to her kin, and others called her "Amonute." "Pocahontas" was only a nickname, and it can variously be translated to "little wanton", "playful one", "little brat", or "the naughty one". Pocahontas was around 10 or 11 at the time John Smith arrived with the Virginia Company in 1607, in contrast to her portrayal as a mature young adult in the film.

Smith is portrayed as an amiable man; in reality, he was described as having a harsh exterior and a very authoritarian personality by his fellow colonists. Historically, there is no evidence of a romantic relationship emerging between Pocahontas and Smith. Whether or not Pocahontas saved Smith's life is debated. In his work, Smith did not account of any danger in his life while he was a prisoner. However, after Pocahontas married John Rolfe, he elaborated a story about her intervention.

In April 1613, three years after Smith departed for England, Pocahontas became a captive of Captain Samuel Argall in Jamestown. She also converted to Christianity in Henricus. Rolfe, who had recently come to England to try some tobacco, became interested in Pocahontas when she was about 18 and he was 28. He proposed a diplomatic marriage to Powhatan in a confession letter that proceeded to create an alliance between the groups. It is unclear whether Pocahontas reciprocated Rolfe's feelings. This marriage helped to establish a short period of peace between the English and the Powhatan. Rolfe may have simply represented a way to establish peaceful relations in her community and a way to escape her oppressive captors.

Governor Ratcliffe did not return to England, but was killed by the Powhatan in 1609.

Ebert criticized the film's deviations from history, writing "Having led one of the most interesting lives imaginable, Pocahontas serves here more as a simplified symbol". Sophie Gilbert of The Atlantic wrote that "The movie might have fudged some facts", but that this allowed it to tell "a compelling romantic story". Conversely, animator Tom Sito defended the film's relationship to history, stating that "Contrary to the popular verdict that we ignored history on the film, we tried hard to be historically correct and to accurately portray the culture of Virginia's Algonquins."

== Legacy ==
A live musical show titled The Spirit of Pocahontas was performed at the Fantasyland Theatre at Disneyland during the film's theatrical release. A video game titled Disney's Pocahontas based on the film was released on the Sega Genesis/Mega Drive in 1996. The legacy of Disney's Pocahontas video game, especially the Game Boy version, is mixed. While praised for its animation, positive themes, and the unique gameplay of Pocahontas learning skills from animals, it suffers from awkward controls and illogical puzzles, which can frustrate younger players. Despite these flaws, the game is notable for attempting to combine environmental themes with platforming, reflecting the film's message of harmony. However, its difficulty and unclear visuals have limited its lasting impact within the Disney game franchise.

The film was followed by a direct-to-video sequel, titled Pocahontas II: Journey to a New World, released on August 25, 1998. Bedard and Kuhn reprised their roles as Pocahontas's speaking and singing voices, respectively. Donal Gibson starred as John Smith and Billy Zane starred as John Rolfe. Characters from the first film make cameo appearances in numerous episodes of the television series House of Mouse. Pocahontas, alongside other Disney Princesses, briefly appeared in the 2018 film Ralph Breaks the Internet, with Bedard reprising the role. Pocahontas also made a brief appearance in the 2023 live-action/animated short Once Upon a Studio, with Kuhn returning to do the character's singing voice.

Critics have also discussed the influence of Pocahontas on other films. Sophie Gilbert of The Atlantic argues that the strong and brave title character of Pocahontas influenced the portrayal of subsequent heroines of Disney animated films, specifically Mulan, Rapunzel, Merida, and Elsa. Similarly, The Verge's Tasha Robinson wrote that Moana (2016) "draws on" Pocahontas in its portrayal of a woman buoyed by her culture. According to HuffPost, James Cameron's Avatar (2009) is a "rip-off" of Pocahontas. Avatar's producer Jon Landau has said that Avatar is akin to Pocahontas with the Na'vi aliens taking the place of Native Americans. Cameron has said that he first conceived of Avatar in the 1960s, long before Pocahontas was released, but he has also said that Avatar does reference the story of Pocahontas, the historical figure. Kirsten Acuna of Business Insider wrote that, while Avatar may be based on Cameron's own ideas, it nevertheless takes inspiration from animated films like Pocahontas and FernGully: The Last Rainforest (1992).

The New York Times reported in 2023 how Disney has appeared to downplay the film and was not interested in remaking the film as they have done with other animated films due to its subject matter and associated historical controversy. In 2025, the New York Times reported on the continued long-lasting popularity of the song "Colors of the Wind."

== Bibliography ==
- Canemaker, John (1996). Before the Animation Begins: The Art and Lives of Disney Inspirational Sketch Artists. New York: Hyperion. ISBN 978-0-78686-152-1.
- Canemaker, John (2010). Two Guys Named Joe: Master Animation Storytellers Joe Grant and Joe Ranft. New York: Disney Editions. ISBN 978-1-42311-067-5.
- Ghez, Didier (2020). They Drew as They Pleased Vol. 6: The Hidden Art of Disney's New Golden Age. San Francisco: Chronicle Books. ISBN 978-1-79720-093-4.
- de Giere, Carol (2008). Defying Gravity: The Creative Career of Stephen Schwartz from Godspell to Wicked. New York: Applause Theatre & Cinema Books. pp. 229–241. ISBN 978-1-55783-745-5.
- Koenig, David (1997). Mouse Under Glass: Secrets of Disney Animation & Theme Parks. Irvine, California: Bonaventure Press. pp. 238–245. ISBN 978-0-96406-051-7.
- Laird, Paul (2014). The Musical Theater of Stephen Schwartz: From Godspell to Wicked and Beyond. Lanham, Maryland: Rowman & Littlefield. ISBN 978-0-81089-191-3.
- Robello, Stephen (1995). The Art of Pocahontas. New York: Hyperion. ISBN 978-0-78686-158-3.
- Sito, Tom (2006). Drawing the Line: The Untold Story of the Animation Unions from Bosko to Bart Simpson. University Press of Kentucky. ISBN 978-0-81312-407-0.
