= Judy Kuhn =

American actress and singer (born 1958)

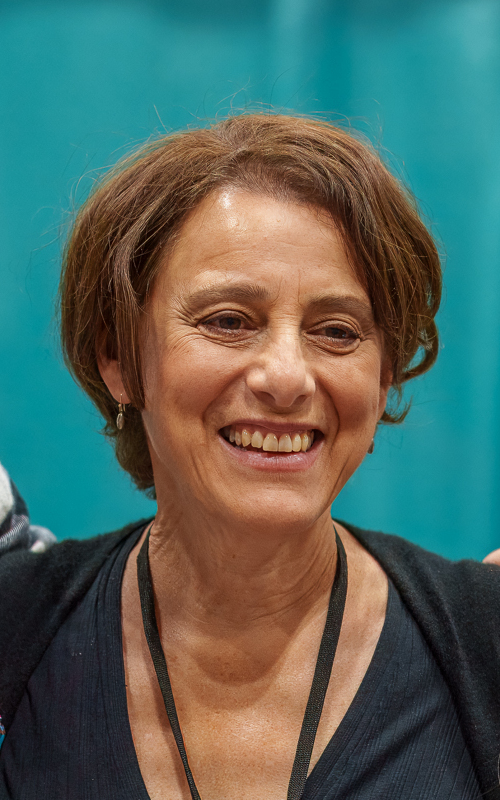
- Kuhn in 2025 at Animate! Orlando

Background information
- Born: May 20, 1958 (age 68); New York City, New York, U.S.
- Genre: Broadway musical
- Occupations: Actress, singer, activist
- Instrument: Vocals (Soprano)
- Years active: 1981–present
- Website: judykuhn.net

Judy Kuhn (born May 20, 1958) is an American actress and singer, known for her work in musical theatre. A four-time Tony Award nominee, she has released four studio albums and sang the title role in the 1995 film Pocahontas, including her rendition of the song "Colors of the Wind", which won its composers the Academy Award for Best Original Song.

Kuhn made her professional stage debut in 1981 and her Broadway debut in the 1985 original production of the musical The Mystery of Edwin Drood. Subsequent Broadway roles include Cosette in Les Misérables (1987), Florence Vassy in Chess (1988), and Amalia Balash in She Loves Me (1993). For all three, she received Tony Award nominations. She returned to Les Misérables in 2007 to play the role of Fantine. She received an Olivier Award nomination for her 1989 West End debut playing Maria/Futura in Metropolis. Other musical roles include Betty Schaeffer in the 1993 US premiere production of Sunset Boulevard in Los Angeles, Sara Jane Moore in the 2021 Off-Broadway revival of Assassins, and her Obie Award winning role as Emmie in the 2001 Off-Broadway production of Eli's Comin. She received a fourth Tony nomination in 2015 for her role as Helen Bechdel in the original Broadway production of Fun Home, and a second Olivier nomination in 2020 for her role as Golde in a London revival of Fiddler on the Roof.

== Early life ==
Kuhn (pronounced Kew-hn) was born in New York City to Jewish parents and grew up in Bethesda, Maryland. She attended Georgetown Day School in Washington, D.C. She entered Oberlin College. After taking voice lessons with Frank Farina, Kuhn transferred into the Oberlin Conservatory of Music. Kuhn was also interested in musical theater and other types of music, in addition to classical music for which the Conservatory is best known. She trained as an "operatic soprano" at Oberlin, and graduated in 1981.

After college, she moved to Boston, where she waited tables and studied acting. After appearing in summer stock, Kuhn moved back to New York.

== Stage career ==
=== 1985–1989 ===
Her Broadway debut was in Drood, a Rupert Holmes musical based on the unfinished Charles Dickens novel, in 1985. She played the roles of "Alice / Miss Isabel Yearsley / Succubae" and understudied the title role played by Betty Buckley. Her next appearance on Broadway was in the ill-fated Rags, which opened on August 21, 1986, and closed after four performances.

Her next role of Cosette in the 1987 multiple award-winning Broadway production of Les Misérables brought her the first Tony Award nomination, as Best Featured Actress in a Musical (1987), and the Drama Desk Award (1987) nomination as Outstanding Featured Actress in A Musical.

Kuhn appeared in the Trevor Nunn-directed Chess, with music by Benny Andersson and Björn Ulvaeus and lyrics by Tim Rice in the 1988 Broadway transfer from the West End, playing one of the main roles (Florence Vassy). Despite the show's success in London, Trevor Nunn decided to rework it for Broadway from a pop/rock opera as staged in London into a more conventional musical theater piece with a new book by Richard Nelson. As a result, the new show was greeted with mostly negative reviews and closed after less than a two-month run, on June 25, 1988. Kuhn's performance in the musical received praise from the critics. "Her beautiful pop-soprano voice is the show's chief pleasure. She acts the sympathetic, gutsy role with spirit and heart", wrote Variety. The Village Voice noted that "she pours a river of feeling and lush vocal tone into...the role". She garnered her second Tony Award nomination, this time as Best Actress in a Musical (1988), and a 1988 Drama Desk Award nomination as Outstanding Actress in a Musical. In addition, The Original Broadway Cast recording of the musical was nominated for a Grammy Award.

She reprised her role of Florence Vassy later in January 1989 in a Carnegie Hall concert performance with the rest of the Broadway cast, which was a benefit for the Emergency Shelter Inc. She also performed in a Chess concert version in 1989 in Skellefteå, Sweden, during a chess World Cup final tournament, where she joined with Tommy Körberg and Murray Head, two principal actors from 1986 West End production of the musical.

Kuhn made her London debut in 1989, when she starred in the West End production of Metropolis, with Jeremy Kingston, reviewing for The Times (London) writing "I greatly enjoyed Kuhn's edgy, angular performance." She received an Olivier Award nomination as Best Actress in a Musical.

=== 1990–1996 ===
Kuhn's next major Broadway project, Two Shakespearean Actors (1992), despite a cast that included Brian Bedford, Frances Conroy, Hope Davis, Victor Garber, Laura Innes and Eric Stoltz, was commercially unsuccessful, closing after 29 regular performances.

In 1993, Kuhn played in the Roundabout Theater Company revival of She Loves Me, portraying Amalia Balash, a young Budapest shopgirl who is unaware that the co-worker she despises is the young man with whom she's been sharing an anonymous correspondence. Her performance earned her a Tony Award nomination as Best Actress in a Musical. The 1993 Broadway recording of this revival does not feature Kuhn, who left the production before the album was produced.

In December 1993, Kuhn played the role of Betty Schaefer in the U.S. premiere production of Sunset Boulevard at the Shubert Theatre in Los Angeles. The L.A production recorded a cast album, which is the only unabridged cast recording of the show with the original London recording being cut by thirty minutes.

Regional theatre credits in the early 1990s include The Glass Menagerie at the McCarter Theatre, Princeton, New Jersey, in 1991 as Laura and Martin Guerre, at the Hartford Stage Company, Hartford, Connecticut, in 1993. Kuhn reprised her role as Cosette in 1995, for the 10th anniversary concert performance at the Royal Albert Hall in London, which was released on DVD as Les Miserables: The Dream Cast in Concert.

=== 1997–2006 ===
Kuhn appeared in the Broadway concert King David which was a 1997 Disney project with a book and lyrics by Tim Rice and music by Alan Menken and directed by Mike Ockrent. It played for a nine-performance limited run at the New Amsterdam Theatre.

Kuhn sang in the second annual benefit concert for The Actors' Fund of Funny Girl in September 2002 at the New Amsterdam Theatre, with different actresses taking on the role of Fanny Brice. She sang "Who Are You Now?" and "People" of which Andrew Gans of Playbill wrote: she "provided an intense, moving, full-voiced 'People,' sensationally belting 'are the luckiest peeeeeeople (wow!) in the wooorld'."

Kuhn's Off-Broadway and regional theater credits in this period include: As Thousands Cheer (1998) Off-Broadway at the Drama Dept., Greenwich House Theater; Strike up the Band (1998) Off-Broadway Encores! Concerts at New York City Center; the title role in The Ballad of Little Jo (2000) at the Steppenwolf Theatre Company in Chicago; Eli's Comin (2001) Off-Broadway at the Vineyard Theatre Company (for which she won an Obie Award); The Highest Yellow (2004) at the Signature Theater in Virginia; and Three Sisters (2005) In a new adaption by Craig Lucas at the Intiman Theatre in Seattle, Washington.

=== 2007–present ===
On October 23, 2007, Kuhn returned to the Broadway production of Les Misérables after 20 years, this time assuming the role of Fantine. She succeeded Lea Salonga and remained with the show until the revival ended on January 6, 2008.

Kuhn portrayed Fosca in the Off-Broadway Classic Stage Company revival of the Stephen Sondheim-James Lapine musical Passion from its opening in February 2013 through its scheduled closing in April 2013. Kuhn had previously played Fosca in the Stephen Sondheim celebration production in 2002 at the Kennedy Center.

In 2013, Kuhn originated the role of Helen Bechdel in the off-Broadway Public Theater production of the musical Fun Home, which began its run September 30, 2013 and opened officially on October 22, 2013. The run was extended multiple times and closed on January 12, 2014. She played the same role in the Broadway production, which ran from April 2015 to September 10, 2016, at the Circle in the Square.

Kuhn played the role of "Golde" in the Broadway revival of Fiddler on the Roof, starting on November 22, 2016. She played Golde in the Menier Chocolate Factory (London) production of Fiddler on the Roof which began on November 23, 2018, and ran to March 9, 2019.

From March to May 2024, Kuhn appeared in the musical Unknown Soldier by Daniel Goldstein and Michael Friedman at the Arena Stage in Washington, D.C.

In June 2024, Kuhn portrayed Ida Straus in Titanic at New York City Center.

== Career outside theatre ==
Her television credits include Law & Order and Law & Order: SVU, All My Children and two PBS shows: My Favorite Broadway: The Leading Ladies (recorded 1998, released 1999) and In Performance at the White House: A Tribute to Broadway – The Shows in March 1988.

Kuhn sang the title role in the 1995 Disney animated film Pocahontas. The film's score won an Academy Award, and the soundtrack reached #1 on the Billboard 200, selling over 2.5 million copies. The film included Kuhn's rendition of the song "Colors of the Wind", which won the Academy Award for Best Original Song and a Grammy Award.

Kuhn also sang as Pocahontas in the straight-to-video sequel Pocahontas II: Journey to a New World, in "If You Can Dream", a Disney Princess song, and the 2023 live-action/animated short Once Upon a Studio. Kuhn briefly appeared in the film Long Time Since (1998) and supplied the vocals for the movie's soundtrack, which includes a rendition of Auld Lang Syne.

She has performed in concert at Carnegie Hall, Alice Tully Hall, and Avery Fisher Hall in Manhattan, the Kennedy Center for the Performing Arts and at the Royal Albert Hall in London. She has performed in a solo cabaret/nightclub act at, for example, Joe's Pub at the Public Theater in October 2007 and the Iridium in New York in January 2008. She performed her solo concert at Feinstein's at Loews Regency in March 2012.

Her first solo album, Just in Time: Judy Kuhn Sings Jule Styne, was released on January 31, 1995. Kuhn's second solo album, Serious Playground: The Songs of Laura Nyro, was released on October 2, 2007. In 2013, she released her third album All This Happiness, which contains pop, jazz, cabaret, and blues songs, along with the title song of the album, from the Stephen Sondheim musical Passion.

Kuhn also teaches a song interpretation class at Michael Howard Studios in New York City, where she studied earlier in her career. Andrew Gans of Playbill wrote that Kuhn "possesses one of the richest and most exciting instruments around; it is also an extremely versatile and rangy voice" and that Kuhn has "remarkable interpretive skills".

== Personal life ==
Kuhn lives with her husband, David Schwab, in New York City. They have one daughter, Anna.

== Filmography ==
=== Film and television ===
Year	Title	Role	Notes
1992	Lifestories: Families in Crisis		television debut Episode: "The Secret Life of Mary Margaret: Portrait of a Bulimic"
1995	Pocahontas	Pocahontas	film debut (singing voice only)
1995	Disney Sing-Along Songs: Colors of the Wind	Pocahontas	(singing voice only); Short film
1998	Pocahontas II: Journey to a New World	Pocahontas	(singing voice only); Direct-to-video
1998–2003	Law & Order	Adrienne Longmire/Beth Prentiss	2 episodes: "Expert" (1998)/Episode: "Seer" (2003)
2003	Hope & Faith	Colleen	Episode: "About a Book Club"
2004	Law & Order: Criminal Intent	Dr. Anna Ford	Episode: "Conscience"
2004	Mulan II	Princess Ting Ting	(singing voice only); Direct-to-video
2007	Law & Order: Special Victims Unit	Corinne Nicholson	Episode: "Savant"
2007	Enchanted	Pregnant Woman with Kids	
2012	Elementary	Board Member	Episode: "The Rat Race"
2021	Tick, Tick... Boom!	Nan	
2023	Once Upon a Studio	Pocahontas	(singing role); Short film

=== Stage ===
Year	Title	Role	Venue
1985–1987	The Mystery of Edwin Drood	Citizen of Cloisterham, Alice / Miss Isabel Yearsley / Succubae	Imperial Theatre
1986	Rags	Bella Cohen	Mark Hellinger Theatre
1987	Les Misérables	Cosette	Broadway Theatre
1988	Chess	Florence Vassy	Imperial Theatre
1989	Metropolis	Maria/Futura	Piccadilly Theatre
1992	Two Shakespearean Actors	Miss Helen Burton	Cort Theatre
1993	Sunset Boulevard	Betty Schaefer	Shubert Theatre
1993–1994	She Loves Me	Amalia Balash	Brooks Atkinson Theatre
1995	Les Miserables: The Dream Cast in Concert	Cosette	filmed at Royal Albert Hall
1997	King David	Michal	New Amsterdam Theatre
1998	As Thousands Cheer	unknown	Greenwich House Theater
2001	Eli's Comin'	Emmie	Vineyard Theatre
2002	Passion	Fosca	Kennedy Center
2002	Funny Girl	Fanny Brice	New Amsterdam Theatre
2005	Children and Art	unknown role	New Amsterdam Theatre
2005	A Wonderful Life	Mary Bailey	Shubert Theatre
2007–2008	Les Misérables	Fantine	Broadhurst Theatre
2009	Chance & Chemistry	unknown role	Minskoff Theatre
2013	Passion	Fosca	Classic Stage Company
2013	Fun Home	Helen Bechdel	The Public Theater
2015–2016	Fun Home	Helen Bechdel	Circle in the Square Theatre
2016	Fiddler on the Roof	Golde (replaced Jessica Hecht)	Broadway Theatre
2018	Steel Magnolias	M'Lynn	The Cape Playhouse
2018	Fiddler on the Roof	Golde	Menier Chocolate Factory & Playhouse Theatre
2021-2022	Assassins	Sara Jane Moore	Classic Stage Company
2022	Assassins	Sara Jane Moore	Stephen Sondheim Theatre
2023	I Can Get It for You Wholesale	Mrs. Bogen	Classic Stage Company
2024	Titanic	Ida Straus	New York City Center
2025	The Baker's Wife	Denise	Classic Stage Company

== Discography ==
=== List of albums ===
Title	Album details	Peak chart positions					Certifications	Sales
Title	Album details	US					Certifications	Sales
The Mystery of Edwin Drood	Release date: 1985; Label: Formats: CD, cassette	—	—	—	—	—		
Les Misérables	Release date: March, 1987; Label: Formats: CD, cassette	—	—	—	—	—	US: unknown	World: unknown; US: unknown
Chess	Release date: 1988; Label: Formats: CD, cassette	—	—	—	—	—		
Aspects of Love	Release date: 1989; Label: Formats: CD, cassette	—	—	—	—	—		
Metropolis	Release date: 1989; Label: Formats:CD, cassette	—	—	—	—	—		
Rags, A New American Musical	Release date: 1991; Label: Formats: CD, cassette	—	—	—	—	—		
Unsung Sondheim	Release date: 1993; Label: Formats: CD, cassette	—	—	—	—	—		
Sunset Boulevard	Release date: September 13, 1994; Label: Formats: CD, cassette	—	—	—	—	—		
Just in Time: Judy Kuhn Sings Jule Styne	Release date: January 31, 1995; Label: Varèse Sarabande/Varese; Formats: CD, cassette	—	—	—	—	—		
Les Miserables - The Dream Cast in Concert	Release date: 1995; Label: Formats: CD, cassette	—	—	—	—	—		
Pocahontas	Release date: May 30, 1995; Label: Walt Disney; Formats: CD, cassette	—	—	—	—	—	US: unknown	World: unknown; US: unknown
As Thousands Cheer	Release date: March 23, 1999; Label: Formats: CD, cassette	—	—	—	—	—		
Mulan II	Release date: January 25, 2005; Label: Walt Disney; Formats: CD	—	—	—	—	—		
Serious Playground - The Songs of Laura Nyro	Release date: October 2, 2007; Label: Ghostlight/Sh-K-Boom; Formats: CD	—	—	—	—	—		
Pocahontas II: Journey to a New World	Release date: November 23, 2009; Label: Walt Disney; Formats: CD	—	—	—	—	—		
Passion	Release date: 2013; Label: PS Classics; Formats: CD	—	—	—	—	—		
All This Happiness	Release date: 2013; Label: PS Classics; Formats: CD	—	—	—	—	—		
Fun Home	Release date: May 19, 2015; Label: PS Classics; Formats: CD	—	—	—	—	—		

=== Singles ===
Year	Title	Peak chart positions				Certifications	Album
Year	Title	US	US AC			Certifications	Album
1987	"Rue Plument - In My Life"	—	—	—	—		Les Misérables
1987	"A Heart Full of Love"	—	—	—	—		Les Misérables
1987	"The Attack on the Rue Plumet"	—	—	—	—		Les Misérables
1987	"Every Day"	—	—	—	—		Les Misérables
1987	"Wedding Chorale"	—	—	—	—		Les Misérables
1987	"Valjean's Death"	—	—	—	—		Les Misérables
1988	"How Many Woman" (with Philip Casnoff)	—	—	—	—		Chess
1988	"You Want to Lose Your Only Friend?" (with Philip Casnoff)	—	—	—	—		Chess
1988	"Someone Else's Story"	—	—	—	—		Chess
1988	"Terrace Duet" (with David Carroll)	—	—	—	—		Chess
1988	"Nobody's Side"	—	—	—	—		Chess
1988	"Heaven Help My Heart"	—	—	—	—		Chess
1988	"You and I" (with David Carroll & Marcia Mitzman)	—	—	—	—		Chess
1988	"I Know Him So Well"	—	—	—	—		Chess
1988	"Lullaby (Apukad Eros Kezen)"	—	—	—	—		Chess
1988	"You and I (Reprise)"	—	—	—	—		Chess
1989	"Hold Back the Night" (with Lindsey Danvers, Stifyn Parri & Robert Fardell)	—	—	—	—		Metropolis
1989	"Children of Metropolis"	—	—	—	—		Metropolis
1989	"Bring on the Night"	—	—	—	—		Metropolis
1989	"You are the Light" (and Company)	—	—	—	—		Metropolis
1989	"Futura's Dance" (and Company)	—	—	—	—		Metropolis
1989	"Learning Song" (with Children)	—	—	—	—		Metropolis
1989	"Futura's Promise"	—	—	—	—		Metropolis
1989	"Haven't You Finished With Me?" (with Jonathan Adams)	—	—	—	—		Metropolis
1989	"Let's Watch the World Go to the Devil (and Company)	—	—	—	—		Metropolis
1989	"One of These Nights"	—	—	—	—		Metropolis
1993	"What Can You Lose?"	—	—	—	—		Unsung Sondheim
1993	"Let's Have Lunch" (with Alan Campbell, Vincent Tumeo & Sal Mistretta)	—	—	—	—		Sunset Boulevard
1993	"Every Movie's a Circus" (with Alan Campbell)	—	—	—	—		Sunset Boulevard
1993	"Every Movie's a Circus (Reprise)" (with Vincent Tumeo & Alan Campbell)	—	—	—	—		Sunset Boulevard
1993	"Girl Meets Boy" (with Alan Campbell)	—	—	—	—		Sunset Boulevard
1993	"This Time Next Year" (with Vincent Tumeo, Alan Campbell & Alan Oppenheimer)	—	—	—	—		Sunset Boulevard
1993	"Girl Meets Boy (Reprise)" (with Alan Campbell)	—	—	—	—		Sunset Boulevard
1993	"Too Much in Love to Care" (with Alan Campbell)	—	—	—	—		Sunset Boulevard
1993	"The Final Scene" (with Alan Campbell, Glenn Close & George Hearn)	—	—	—	—		Sunset Boulevard
1995	"You'll Never Get Away from Me"	—	—	—	—		Just in Time: Judy Kuhn Sings Jule Styne
1995	"Time After Time"	—	—	—	—		Just in Time: Judy Kuhn Sings Jule Styne
1995	"Saturday Night (Is the Loneliest Night of the Week)"	—	—	—	—		Just in Time: Judy Kuhn Sings Jule Styne
1995	"Just Around the Riverbend"	—	—	—	—		Pocahontas
1995	"Colors of the Wind"	—	—	—	—	US: unknown	Pocahontas
1999	"How's Chances?" (with Lou Bruno/Richard Chamberlain/Dr. David Evans/Howard McGillin/B.D. Wong)	—	—	—	—		As Thousands Cheer
1999	"Lonely Heart" (with Lou Bruno & Dr. David Evans)	—	—	—	—		As Thousands Cheer
1999	"Easter Parade" (with Lou Bruno/Dr. David Evans/Howard McGillin)	—	—	—	—		As Thousands Cheer
2005	"Like Other Girls" (with Beth Blankenship & Mandy Gonzalez)	—	—	—	—		Mulan II
2009	"Where Do I Go From Here"	—	—	—	—		Pocahontas II: Journey to a New World
2009	"What a Day in London"	—	—	—	—		Pocahontas II: Journey to a New World
2009	"Between Two Worlds (End Title)" (with Billy Zane)	—	—	—	—		Pocahontas II: Journey to a New World
2013	"Sometimes my father appeared to enjoy having children" (with Beth Malone & Michael Cerveris)	—	—	—	—		Fun Home
2013	"Welcome to Our House on Maple Avenue" (with Beth Malone, Sydney Lucas, Griffin Birney, Noah Hinsdale, Michael Cerveris & Joel Perez)	—	—	—	—		Fun Home
2013	"Helen's Etude" (with Beth Malone, Michael Cerevis, Sydney Lucas, Noah Hinsdale, Griffin Birney & Alexandra Socha)	—	—	—	—		Fun Home
2013	"I leapt out of the closet..." (with Beth Malone, Sydney Lucas & Michael Cerveris)	—	—	—	—		Fun Home
2013	"Read a book..." (with Michael Cerveris & Sydney Lucas)	—	—	—	—		Fun Home
2013	"Shortly after we were married..." (with Alexandra Socha)	—	—	—	—		Fun Home
2013	"Days and Days"	—	—	—	—		Fun Home

== Awards and nominations ==
=== Theatre ===
Source:IBDB

Year	Award	Category	Work	Result
1987	Tony Award	Best Featured Actress in a Musical	Les Misérables	Nominated
1987	Drama Desk Award	Outstanding Featured Actress in a Musical	Les Misérables	Nominated
1987	Drama Desk Award	Outstanding Featured Actress in a Musical	Rags	Nominated
1988	Tony Award	Best Actress in a Musical	Chess	Nominated
1988	Drama Desk Award	Outstanding Actress in a Musical	Chess	Nominated
1989	Laurence Olivier Award	Best Actress in a Musical	Metropolis	Nominated
1994	Tony Award	Best Actress in a Musical	She Loves Me	Nominated
2001	Obie Award	Performance	Eli's Comin'	Won
2014	Lucille Lortel Award	Outstanding Featured Actress in a Musical	Fun Home	Won
2014	Outer Critics Circle Award	Outstanding Featured Actress in a Musical	Fun Home	Nominated
2015	Drama League Award	Distinguished Performance	Fun Home	Nominated
2015	Tony Award	Best Featured Actress in a Musical	Fun Home	Nominated
2016	Grammy Award	Best Musical Theater Album	Fun Home	Nominated
2020	Laurence Olivier Award	Best Actress in a Musical	Fiddler on the Roof	Nominated
2022	Drama Desk Award	Outstanding Featured Actress in a Musical	Assassins	Nominated
2022	Outer Critics Circle Awards	Outstanding Featured Actress in a Musical	Assassins	Nominated
2024	Outer Critics Circle Award	Outstanding Featured Performer in an Off-Broadway Musical	I Can Get It for You Wholesale	Nominated
2026	Outer Critics Circle Award	Outstanding Featured Performer in an Off-Broadway Musical	The Baker's Wife	Won
2026	Drama Desk Award	Outstanding Featured Performance in a Musical	The Baker's Wife	Won
2026	Dorian Award	Outstanding Featured Performance in an Off-Broadway Production	The Baker's Wife	Nominated
