= Pocahontas (character) =

Title character of the 1995 Disney animated film of the same name

- Pocahontas character
- First appearance: Pocahontas (1995)
- Created by: Carl Binder; Susannah Grant; Philip LaZebnik
- Voiced by: Irene Bedard (speaking voice); Judy Kuhn (singing voice)
- Based on: Pocahontas

In-universe information
- Occupation: Ambassador to British Empire; Peacekeeper; Maize cultivator (formerly)
- Affiliation: Disney Princesses
- Family: Chief Powhatan (father); Nonoma Winanuske Matatiske (mother)
- Significant others: Kocoum; John Smith; John Rolfe
- Origin: Tsenacommacah
- Nationality: Powhatan Confederacy; Native American

Pocahontas is the titular protagonist of Walt Disney Animation Studios' 1995 film Pocahontas.

The character is loosely based on the actual historical figure Pocahontas (1596–1617), the daughter of Chief Powhatan the Native American leader of the Powhatan Confederacy. Pocahontas is also a character in the Disney Princess franchise, making her the seventh Disney Princess, the first Disney Princess to be based on a real person, and the first American Disney Princess.

Pocahontas is voiced by Native American actress Irene Bedard in the films and all related media. Bedard also served as one of the physical models for the character. Pocahontas' singing voice is performed by Broadway singer Judy Kuhn.

== Development ==
=== Conception and writing ===
A portrait engraving of the actual Pocahontas.

Following his directorial debut with The Rescuers Down Under (1990), Mike Gabriel happened upon an image of Pocahontas in a history book and decided that he wanted to pitch a film about her to Disney executives. Feeling that he was not adept at drawing women, he went to the pitch meeting with a Xeroxed image of Tiger Lily from Peter Pan (1953) which he added animals to. His one sentence pitch for the film was: "An Indian princess falls in love with an English settler, then is torn between her father's wish to destroy the settlers and her need to help them." When Disney executives asked Gabriel to summarize Pocahontas' character, he replied: "She's a girl with a problem." Inspired by William Shakespeare's play Romeo and Juliet, the film's directors Mike Gabriel and Eric Goldberg wanted the story of Pocahontas to feature two characters of very different backgrounds falling in love.

Story supervisor Tom Sito, who became the project's unofficial historical consultant, did extensive research into the early colonial era and the story of John Smith and Pocahontas, and was confronted over the historical inaccuracies from historians. Already knowing that in reality Pocahontas married John Rolfe, Gabriel explained it was felt that "the story of Pocahontas and Rolfe was too complicated and violent for a youthful audience" so instead, they would focus on Pocahontas's meeting with John Smith. While the real Pocahontas was eleven or twelve years old upon meeting John Smith, she is depicted as being around eighteen or nineteen years of age in the film, according to her supervising animator Glen Keane. Keane explained that this change was made because a film wherein a thirty-year-old Smith falls in love with a child would be "sleazy". Roy E. Disney felt that making the character older than the historical figure would make the film "more dramatic".

Disney sought to consult Native American actors and a Native American organization in an attempt to accurately portray Indigenous culture onscreen. Elaine Dutka of the Los Angeles Times theorized that this decision was made due to the negative reception of Aladdin (1992) by the American-Arab Anti-Discrimination Committee; Disney denied Dutka's theory. Native American activist Russell Means who plays Pocahontas' father Powhatan in the film, suggested that Pocahontas say she was "honored" by a gift Powhatan gives in a scene of the film to reflect the ways that Native Americans talked; Disney changed the film's script in accordance with Means' suggestion. Michael Eisner pushed for Pocahontas to have a mother, lamenting that "We're always getting fried for having no mothers." The writers countered that Powhatan was polygamous and formed dynastic alliances among other neighboring tribes by impregnating a local woman and giving away the child, so it was believed that Pocahontas herself probably did not see her mother that much. Storyboard artist Joe Grant would conceive the idea of the swirling leaves to represent Pocahontas's mother. Pocahontas became the first Native American Disney Princess and the first woman of color to be the lead character in a Disney film. As of 2014, she remains the only Disney Princess to be based on a historical figure.

=== Personality and design ===
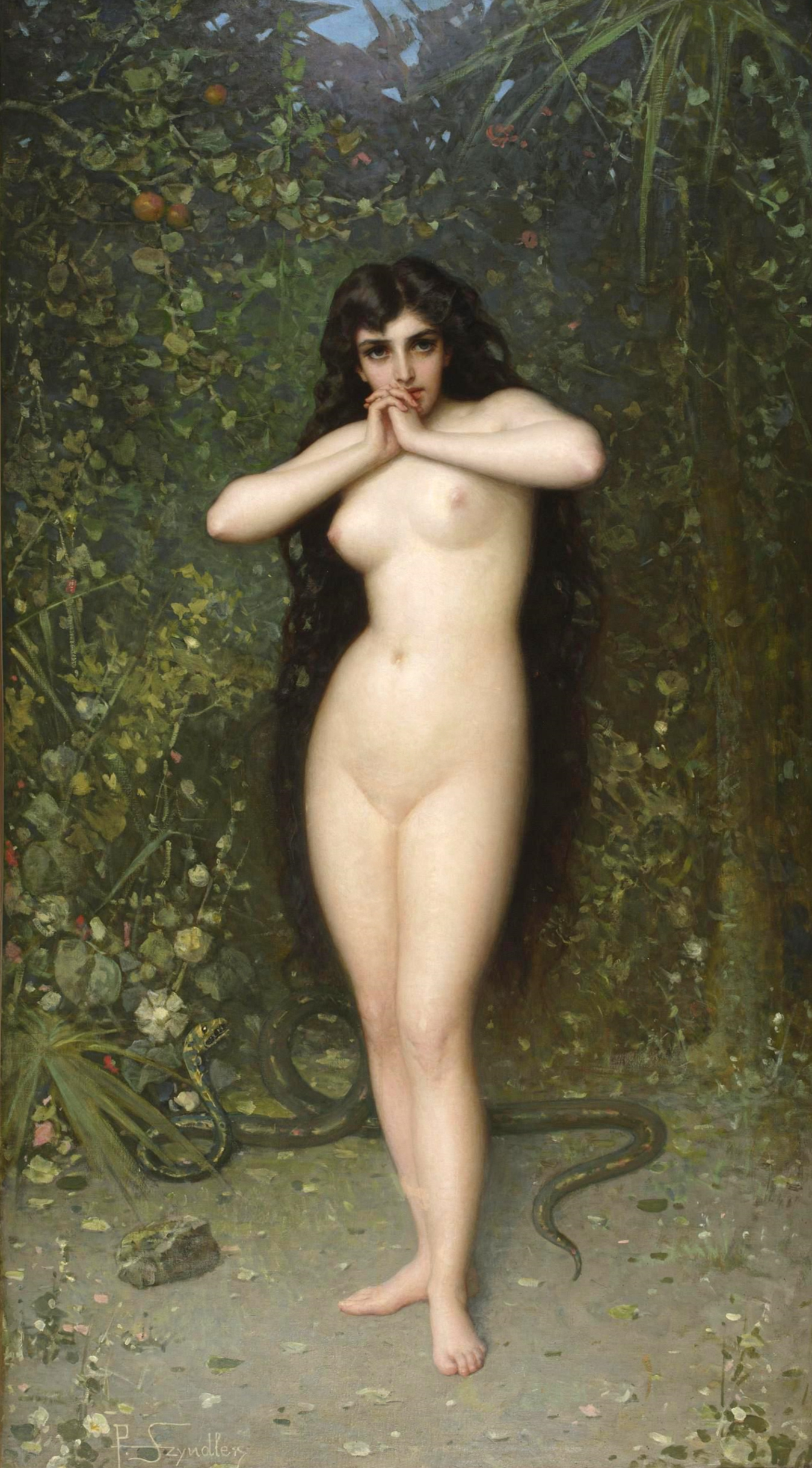
Animator Glen Keane likened Pocahontas to a tribal version of Eve, here painted by Pantaleon Szyndler in 1889.

Keane also wanted Pocahontas to be written as a confident woman, unlike Ariel from The Little Mermaid (1989) or Belle from Beauty and the Beast (1991). The film's producer, Jim Pentecost, viewed the character as "the strongest heroine we've ever had in a Disney film." Disney spokesman Howard Green said that the studio desired for the film to portray its Native American characters in a "real" and "fair" way, in contrast to the "very comic, broad" and inaccurate portrayal of Native Americans in Peter Pan (1953). Green also said that the studio did not want the film to reinforce stereotypes about indigenous peoples of North America. The film's crew met with Ray Adams, the chairman of the United Indians of Virginia, and showed him ten minutes of unfinished animation and the song "Colors of the Wind" to see if they had portrayed Pocahontas in a way which would be more accurate to the Powhatan culture. Adams felt that the character's outfits were an accurate representation of Native American clothing and commented that Pocahontas was shown as "very beautiful and very intelligent and very loving, which the Native Americans are. We usually aren't portrayed as being loving, but the settlers would not have survived the first three winters if we had not been loving and helped them."

Renowned for animating female characters such as Ariel, supervising animator Glen Keane was immediately tapped to draw the titular Indian princess. Following the demands of Jeffrey Katzenberg to make the title character "the most idealized and finest woman ever made", Keane first began to seek inspiration for his depictions for Pocahontas from Shirley 'Little Dove' Custalow-McGowan and Devi White Dove, women he had met during the research trip to Virginia. Keane recalled meeting the women:

So I turned around and there's this beautiful Indian woman walking up; a Native American. She said 'Are you Glen Keane? The animator that's going to do Pocahontas?' I said 'Well, yeah.' And then from behind another tree another woman came up and she said, 'Well, my name is Shirley Little Dove, and this is my sister Devi White Dove, and we are descended from Pocahontas.' And as they stood there, I mean I took a picture of both of them, and between their faces was Pocahontas' face in my mind – I could see her.

Other inspirations were Christy Turlington, Natalie Belcon, Naomi Campbell, Jamie Pillow, white supermodel Kate Moss, Charmaine Craig, and Irene Bedard, who provided the character's speaking voice. Keane also looked to a 1620 depiction of Pocahontas from a history book, though Keane would state she was "not exactly a candidate for People's 'Most Beautiful' issue [so] I made a few adjustments to add an Asian feeling to her face." Pocahontas and all her tribesmen were depicted barefoot in the movie, presumably to signify their connection to nature. Due to the complexity of the color schemes, shapes, and expressions in the animation, a total of 55 animators worked on the design of Pocahontas' character alone, including Mark Henn and Pres Romanillos.

Dyna Taylor, a Filipina college student, was paid $200 to model for the character. She claimed that she was the main model for Pocahontas' face, and had four sessions with Disney animators over three years. At one point she says she was surrounded by 15 animation artists sketching her facial features. She was given an image of the character that Keane autographed with the words "To Dyna, with gratitude for the inspiration you gave us." Disappointed that she was not credited in the film, Taylor considered suing Disney but was advised against doing so by a lawyer she consulted. Keane told The New York Times that he deemed Taylor's contributions to the film unworthy of a screen credit.

Keane felt that the final version of the character was akin to a tribal version of Eve and less sexual and more athletic than an animated character like Jessica Rabbit.

== Themes ==
Pocahontas has been identified as a feminist character who stands up against her father's patriarchal views in her refusal to marry the man her father wants her to marry. Megan Condis, assistant professor of English at Stephen F. Austin State University, has stated that compared to previous Disney Princesses "Pocahontas was definitely a very different type of character in that she isn't as defined by romantic relationships and she's a lot more active. Also, she is one of the first princesses to actually take an active role in governing." Sophie Gilbert of The Atlantic opined that in creating the character "Disney had, for the first time, provided an independent and fearless heroine with a strong sense of self." Gilbert noted that unlike Snow White or Cinderella, Pocahontas is able to find happiness outside of marriage. MTV's Lauren Vino noted that Pocahontas is not a damsel in distress, as she saves Smith's life rather than vice versa.

Upon the twentieth anniversary of Pocahontas, The A.V. Club's Caroline Siede said that the film "remains probably the most high profile story of a Native American in pop culture." Tom Brook of the BBC said that the character's portrayal was impacted by how "[t]he rights of Native Americans were strengthened in the two decades from the mid-1970s by legislation protecting tribal rights and interests".

== Appearances ==
=== Pocahontas ===
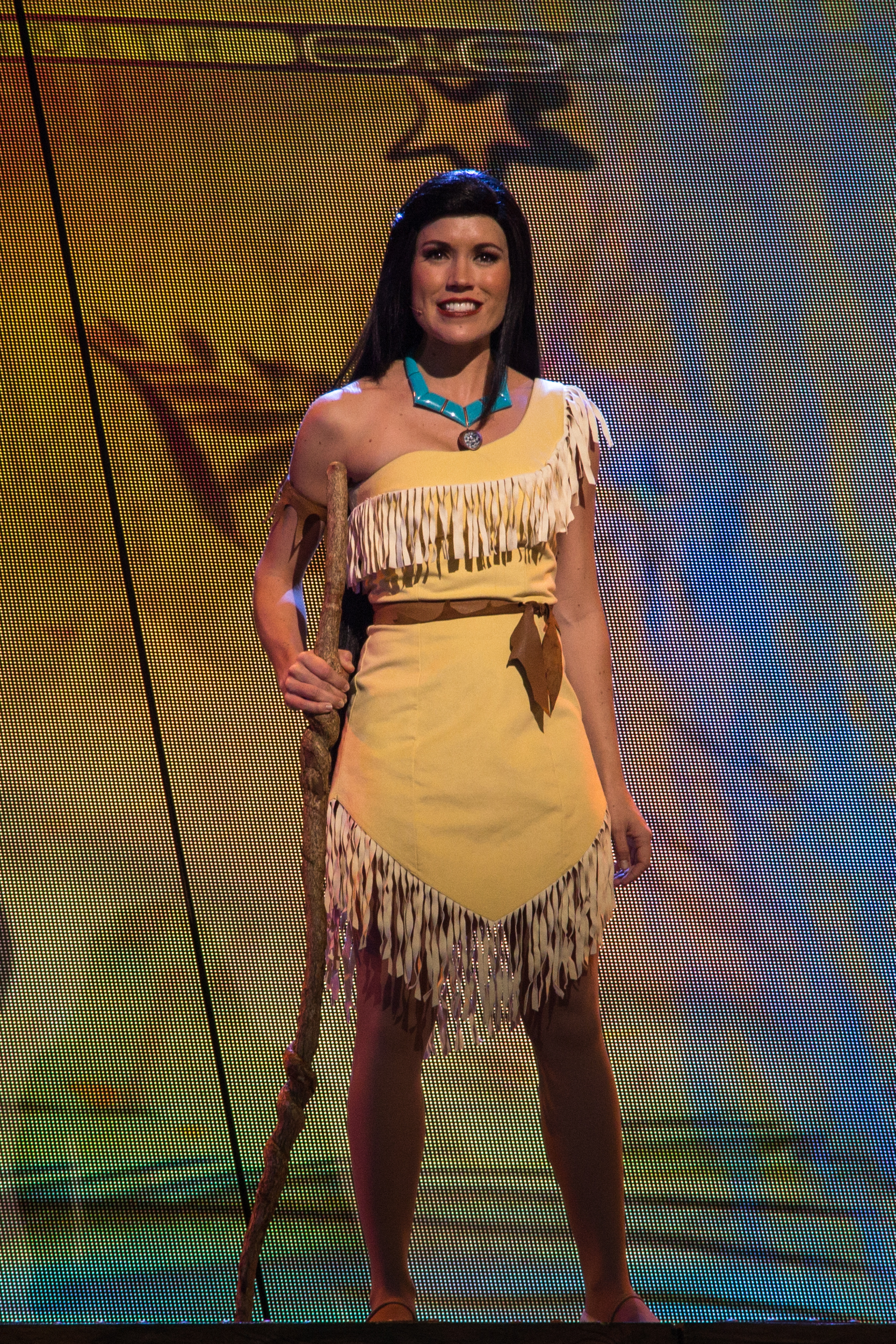
Pocahontas in Mickey and the Magical Map at Disneyland in 2014.

In the beginning of the film, Pocahontas learns that Kocoum, one of her father's bravest warriors, has asked to marry her. (In place of a wedding ring, Pocahontas is given her deceased mother's wedding necklace, and she wears it throughout most of the film.) However, Pocahontas does not feel that this is the right path for her. She is the first one to spot the ship carrying the Europeans, mistaking the ship's sails for clouds. Pocahontas later encounters one of the settlers, John Smith. As the story unfolds, it is revealed that her mother has died and that she lives with her father.

Over time, the two get to know each other, asking all sorts of questions about each other's people, lives, and different worlds. However, the conversation goes sour when John Smith unintentionally reveals his prejudices towards Native Americans. Pocahontas explains to him the beauty and importance of nature and respecting the earth through the song, "Colors of the Wind". This causes John to see the ill of his thoughts and change his ways, and the two fall in love with each other.

When Kocoum stumbles upon Pocahontas and John Smith kissing, he becomes enraged and attacks the white man. Pocahontas attempts to break them up, but Thomas, who had been sent to find John, shoots and kills Kocoum. John Smith takes the blame for Kocoum's death, is arrested by Chief Powhatan's men, and sentenced to death by beheading at sunrise.

Pocahontas realizes that she must stop the execution that will lead to war between the Native Americans and the settlers. She runs to where the execution takes place, calling out to the forces of nature to help her reach them in time. Pocahontas reaches John Smith just in time to throw herself over him and save him from being decapitated by her father, who then comes to his senses and releases Smith. When, enraged, Governor Ratcliffe shoots at the chief, John Smith pushes Powhatan out of the way and takes the bullet instead.

Soon after, a wounded John Smith asks her to come with him to England, but she explains that her place is in Virginia, with her people. To comfort him, she tells him that "no matter what happens, I'll always be with you, forever". They kiss, and the men carry him onto the ship. As it is leaving, Pocahontas runs as fast as she can to a cliff overlooking the ocean. John waves goodbye in the Powhatan fashion, and Pocahontas waves back in the Powhatan fashion, as she showed him earlier when the two first met.

=== Pocahontas II: Journey to a New World ===
In Pocahontas II: Journey to a New World, Pocahontas goes to London as a diplomat to stop a potential attack upon her people being ordered by King James in a plot by Ratcliffe. There, she is accompanied by John Rolfe and slowly develops a romance with him. In the end, she is reunited with John Smith but explains to him that they are "no longer following the same path that they went on years ago", and parts ways with him. Successfully exposing Ratcliffe, who is then arrested by order of the King, Pocahontas and John Rolfe get on a ship going back to Virginia together, and kiss as the ship sails off into the sunset.

== Other appearances ==
She makes cameo appearances in numerous episodes of the television series House of Mouse.

Pocahontas appears in several stories of Disney's 365 Bedtime Stories.

Pocahontas, alongside other Disney Princesses, appeared in the 2018 film Ralph Breaks the Internet, with Bedard returning to voice her.

Pocahontas appears as a playable character in the video game Disney Magic Kingdoms.

She appears in the 2023 live-action/animated short Once Upon a Studio, with Kuhn returning to do her singing voice.

=== Disney Parks and live shows ===
Pocahontas appears daily at the Walt Disney Parks and Resorts in Frontierland and at Disney’s Animal Kingdom for meet and greets alongside Meeko and John Smith. She is the most common Pocahontas character, next to Meeko. In the past, Pocahontas had her own show entitled "Pocahontas and her Forest Friends" at Disney's Animal Kingdom, which ran from 1998 to 2008. Currently, she is featured in Disney's Hollywood Studios nighttime fireworks stage show Fantasmic! and World of Color at Disney's California Adventure Park. She and John Smith appear in the Disney Cruise Line stage show The Golden Mickeys, and is also known to come out for meet-and-greets on the ships. Pocahontas, Meeko, and Flit also make cameo appearances in the Hong Kong Disneyland version of It's a Small World.

== Reception ==
Lauren Vino of MTV considers Pocahontas to be the best of all the Disney Princesses. The San Francisco Chronicle's Peter Stack praised the romance between Pocahontas and Smith, writing that "the film's isolation of the lovers – their secret meetings near a stream, their tentative but enchanted glances, their first kiss – is nothing short of captivating." Owen Gleiberman of Entertainment Weekly stated the character and John Smith are "generic". Peter Travers of Rolling Stone dubbed her "Poca-bore-me" and bemoaned that she "is so busy trying to teach John about protecting the spirit of the land, she hardly has time for romance."

== See also ==
- Tiger Lily (Peter Pan), another Native American princess character portrayed in Disney films
