= Xavier Löwenthal =

Belgian author, cartoonist, publisher and editor

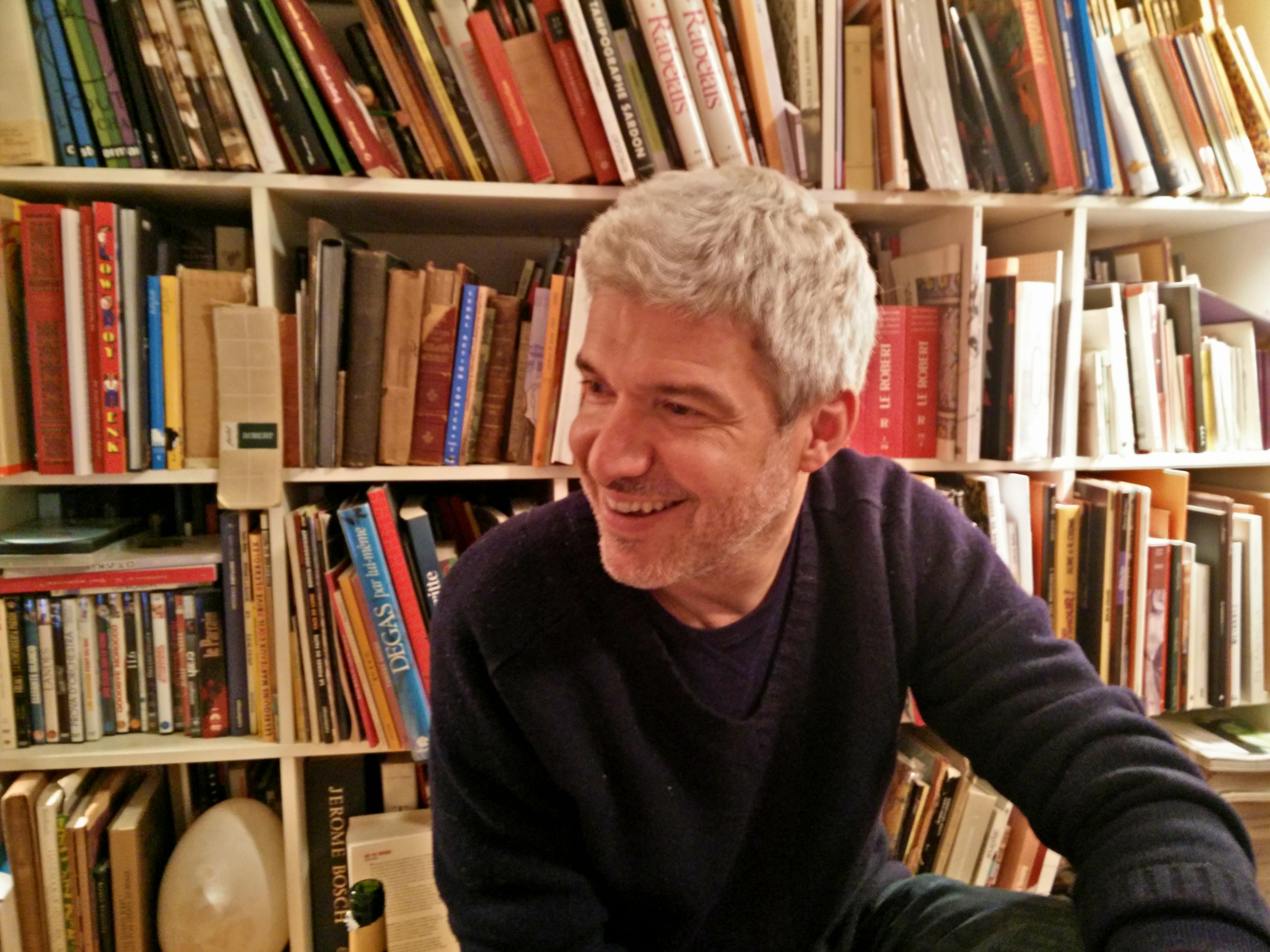
- Xavier Löwenthal
- Born: October 18, 1970 (age 55); Schaerbeek, Brussels, Belgium
- Occupations: Author; cartoonist; publisher; editor; translator; performer
- Known for: Founder of La Cinquième Couche
- Website: xavierlowenthal.com

Xavier Löwenthal (born 18 October 1970 in Schaerbeek, Brussels) is a Belgian author, cartoonist, comics theorist, producer, performer, translator and publisher, and the founder of the publishing group and imprint La Cinquième Couche.

== Biography ==
Löwenthal was born on 18 October 1970 in Schaerbeek, a municipality of Brussels, Belgium. After graduating from the Institut Saint-Luc de Bruxelles, he founded the publishing house La Cinquième Couche.

Since 1994, he has worked within the publishing structure of La Cinquième Couche. As an author, his works include Cotton Schwob (1995), a social satire; Iphigénie (2000), exploring indeterminacy in Newtonian models; Lettres à Pauline (2003); Le Coup de grâce; Les Aventures de Wim Delvoye (with François Olislaeger and Wim Delvoye); Le Manifeste du dégagisme and Le Dégagisme du manifeste (both with the Collectif Manifestement). He has also produced Oulipo-inspired comics, including contributions to Comix 2000 and the journal La 5e Couche.

In 1999, alongside Christophe Poot, he took part in the Terre-Neuve project organised by the Recyclart association, aimed at transforming the urban rupture caused by the North–South railway junction in Brussels, contributing to five panels of approximately 16 square metres (170 sq ft) each.

He has also contributed to the journal Écritures and is the author of pamphlets, including Pour un art après l'art après Auschwitz (Maelström, 2009).

He served as spokesperson for the anonymous author of the controversial comic Katz (Ilan Manouach), a subversive reworking of Maus by Art Spiegelman. With Ilan Manouach, he co-founded Essaim, a concept of collective creation and détournement, including Noirs (2014), a reworking of The Black Smurfs by Peyo, printed entirely in cyan, and Tintei akei Kongo, a Lingala-language version of the famous Tintin album by Hergé.

Under the pen name Judith Forest, he co-authored (with William Henne and Thomas Boivin) the autobiographical comics 1h25 (2009) and Momon (2011), in which Löwenthal appears as a character.

In 2019, he published his first novel, Nathan, described by the RTBF programme Sous Couverture as "a thoroughly contemporary novel on cynicism and the schizophrenia of postmodern society."

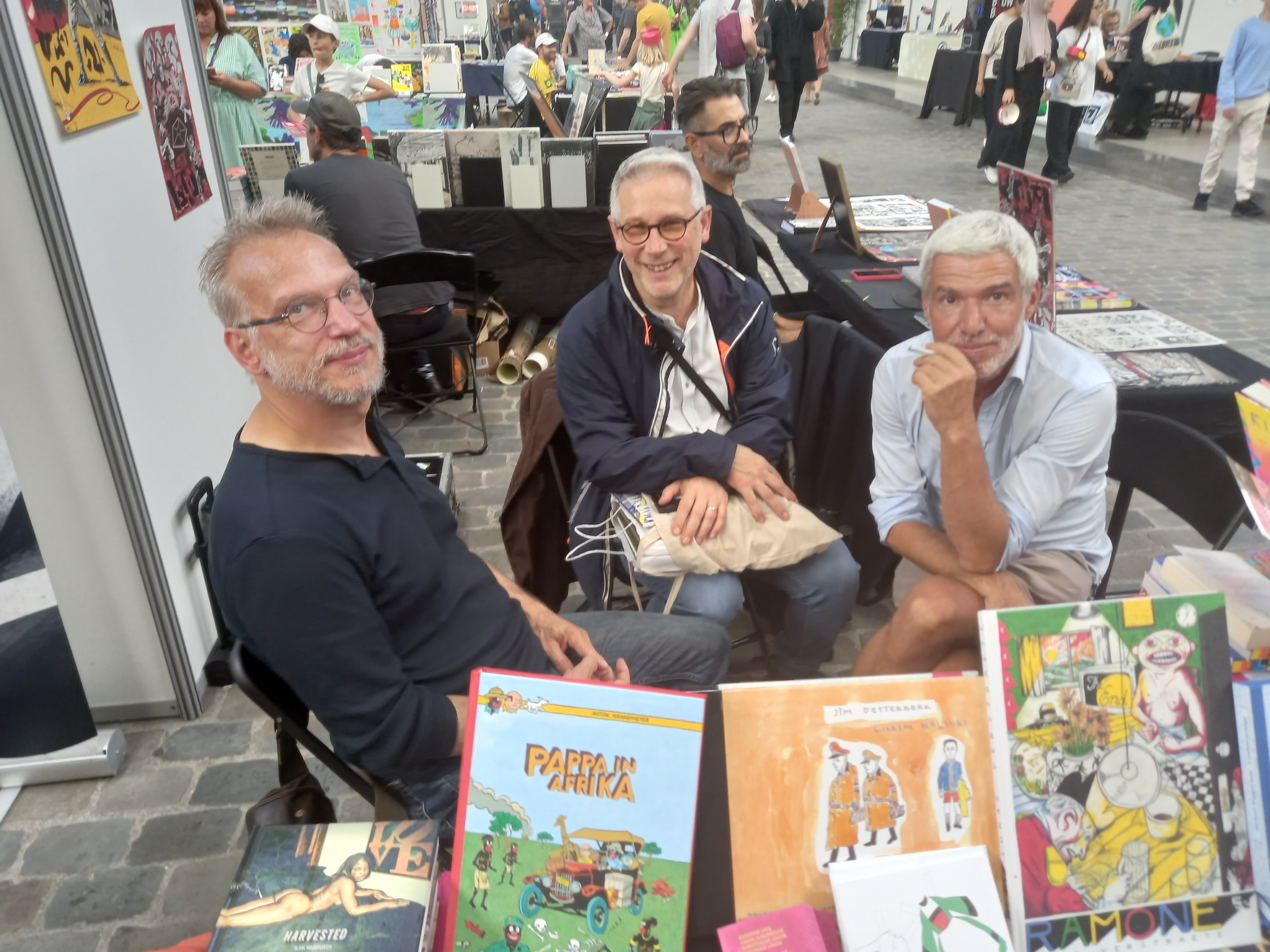
William Henne (left), Didier Pasamonik (centre) and Xavier Löwenthal (right) at the BD Comic Strip Festival, 7 September 2024.

His second novel, KZX (La 5e Couche, 2026), provides the captions for a 60-metre-long illustration by illustrator Lucas Racasse. A pop cyberpunk science-fiction novel, KZX is a postmodern fresco with anarcho-situationist overtones.

He is a founding member of the Collectif Manifestement, alongside his sister Anne Löwenthal, and serves as the collective's spokesperson.

As a translator, his works include Snake 'n' Bacon's Cartoon Cabaret (2008) by Michael Kupperman, L'Art érotique (2020) by Anton Kannemeyer and Conrad Botes, and An Encyclopaedia of Pacifism (2025) by Aldous Huxley, all published by La Cinquième Couche. From 2023 onwards, he has worked with William Henne on editing and publishing the works of Chaïm Kaliski at La Cinquième Couche, including Jim d'Etterbeek, Dossin, and La Destruction des Juifs d'Europe.

He also teaches contemporary dance as part of the project PHD in one night, with Jacques Rancière and People Coming from Nowhere. As an actor, he has appeared in several films in minor roles.

He also teaches at INRACI.

=== Personal life ===
He is the father of three children.

== Publications ==
=== Graphic novels ===
- Cotton Schwob: Based on a True Story, La Cinquième Couche, Brussels, 1995.
- Iphigénie, La Cinquième Couche, Brussels, April 2000. ISBN 2-9600186-2-1. Afterword by François Schuiten.
- Lettres à Pauline : récit d'un voyageur au pays des Indiens Tawahkas, La Cinquième Couche, Brussels, March 2003. ISBN 2-930356-01-4.
- La Jérusalem céleste, les aventures de Wim Delvoye (with François Olislaeger), La Cinquième Couche, Brussels, 2010. ISBN 2-930356-77-4.
- On n'a pas marché sur la Lune (with Sylvain Paris), La Cinquième Couche, Brussels, 2025. ISBN 978-2-39008-116-6. (Note: A satirical and conspiracy-theory essay: Tintin supposedly never went to the Moon. Evidence of the hoax, the authors argue, is scattered throughout Hergé's body of work.)
- KZX (with Lucas Racasse), La Cinquième Couche, Brussels, 2026. ISBN 978-2-39008-130-2.

=== Under the pen name Judith Forest ===
- 1h25 (with William Henne and Thomas Boivin, under the pen name Judith Forest), La Cinquième Couche, Brussels, 2009.
- Momon (with William Henne and Thomas Boivin, under the pen name Judith Forest), La Cinquième Couche, Brussels, 2011.

=== With the Collectif Manifestement ===
- Manifeste du dégagisme, Maelström, Brussels, 2011. ISBN 978-2-87505-087-8.
- Dégagisme du Manifeste, Maelström, Brussels, 2017. ISBN 978-2-87505-261-2.
- Chronique du rattachement de la Belgique au Congo, Maelström, Brussels, 2017. ISBN 978-2-87505-262-9.
- Démocratie, une anthologie, La Cinquième Couche, Brussels, 2024. ISBN 978-2-39008-100-5.

=== Essays and other writings ===
- Notes pour la critique (preface to L'Étang et les spasmes dans la bande dessinée by Pierre Yves Lador), Castagniééé, Vevey, 2006.
- Pour un art après l'art après Auschwitz, pamphlet, Maelström, Brussels, 2009. ISBN 978-2-87505-001-4.
- Metakatz, La Cinquième Couche, Brussels, 2013, 207 pp. ISBN 978-2-930356-90-7.
- Nathan (subtitled roman pornographique et misogyne pour jeune fille), Hélice-Hélas, Vevey, 2019. ISBN 978-2-940522-80-4.

=== Conceptual books and détournements ===
- Astro Boy #6 (with William Henne), La Cinquième Couche, Brussels, 2020. ISBN 978-2-39008-061-9. (Note: Described as the first readymade in the history of literary détournement: the authors purchased 300 copies of the original book from its French-language publisher Kana, and attached labels explaining Marx's concept of surplus value while doubling the original retail price.)
- The Dark Knight Returns Book (with William Henne), La Cinquième Couche, Brussels, 2021. ISBN 978-2-39008-070-1. (Note: A conceptual and satirical book presenting itself as the first e-book adapted for French-speaking readers: it consists of the PostScript code of the PDF of the famous American comics, printed in 7-point type.)

=== Editions of Chaïm Kaliski's work ===
From 2023 onwards, Löwenthal and William Henne have edited and published the works of Chaïm Kaliski at La Cinquième Couche:

- Jim d'Etterbeek, Chaïm Kaliski, La Cinquième Couche, Brussels.
- Dossin, Chaïm Kaliski, La Cinquième Couche, Brussels.
- La Destruction des Juifs d'Europe, Chaïm Kaliski, La Cinquième Couche, Brussels.

=== Collective publications ===
- Comix 2000 (collective including Xavier Löwenthal), L'Association, Paris, December 1999. ISBN 978-2-84414-022-7.
- Suisse – Belgique (collective including Xavier Löwenthal), Castagniééé, Vevey, May 2008. ISBN 978-2-940346-28-8.
- Vivre ? (collective including Xavier Löwenthal), Centre de prévention du suicide, 2010. (Note: An album created on the initiative of the Centre de Prévention du Suicide for its 40th anniversary. Legal deposit: D/2010/12.301/1. Löwenthal's contribution: J'avais oublié.)
- Judex (collective including Xavier Löwenthal, drawings by L.L. de Mars), La Cinquième Couche, Brussels, March 2008. ISBN 978-2-390-08002-2.

=== Translations ===
- Snake 'n' Bacon's Cartoon Cabaret by Michael Kupperman, La Cinquième Couche, Brussels, 2008.
- L'Art érotique by Anton Kannemeyer and Conrad Botes, La Cinquième Couche, Brussels, 2020.
- An Encyclopaedia of Pacifism by Aldous Huxley, La Cinquième Couche, Brussels, 2025. ISBN 978-2-39008-118-0.

=== Illustrations ===
- Portraits crachés (texts by Jean-Pierre Verheggen), Éditions du Somnambule équivoque, Liège, 2005, 89 pp. ISBN 978-2-930377-07-0.
- Les Magasiniers du Ciel by Rodolphe Petit, illustrated by Xavier Löwenthal, Castagniééé, Vevey, 2007. ISBN 978-2-940346-15-8.

=== Exhibition catalogues ===
- Self-Service (Jan Baetens, ed.; illustrated by Denis Deprez, Olivier Deprez, Jan Lens, Jean-Christophe Long, Xavier Löwenthal, Merkeke, Bertrand Panier; translated by Susan R. Rose and Jorge Fallorca), Fréon/Casa Fernando Pessoa, Brussels/Lisbon, 2001. ISBN 2-930204-36-2.
- Le Coup de grâce, La Cinquième Couche, Brussels, 2006. ISBN 978-2-930356-29-7. (Note: Catalogue of the exhibition held during the 16th edition of the Quinzaine de la bande dessinée in Brussels, bringing together comics authors, theorists, writers and contemporary artists.)
- Bruxelles stories (scenario by Patrick van Roy; collective illustrations including Xavier Löwenthal), Zanpano, Paris, 2009. ISBN 978-2-915757-18-7. (Note: Catalogue of the exhibition at the Galerie Petits Papiers in Brussels. Print run: 600 copies.)

== Exhibitions ==
=== Solo exhibitions ===
- Tawahkas, Tropismes bookshop 2, Galerie du Roi, Brussels, 4–30 April 2003.

=== Group exhibitions ===
- Louisiana Manifest (collaboration with the Jean Nouvel workshops), Louisiana Museum of Modern Art, Humlebæk, 6 June – 18 September 2005.
- Articulations, Dexia Art Center, Brussels, 2006.
- Arbres en Plastique, Villa Bernasconi, Geneva, 2006.
- BD Reporters, Centre Georges Pompidou, Paris, 20 December 2006 – 23 April 2007.
- 2nd Helsinki Design Biennale, Helsinki, 2008.
- Archi & BD, Cité de l'Architecture, Paris, 2010.
- International Graphic Arts Exhibition, Lisbon, 2010.
- Génération Spontanée, Espace Franquin, Angoulême, 2011.
- Génération Spontanée, Belgian Comic Strip Center, Brussels, 2011.
- Apostilles, Sismics Comics Festival, Sierre, 2011.
- Los Mellijones, La Jicara, Oaxaca, 2011.
- European Comics Festival, Jumatatea Plina, Bucharest, 2011.
- Both Sides of a Wall, International Comics Festival, Stockholm, 2012.
