= Christophe Poot =

Belgian comics artist, author, publisher and critic (born 1971)

- Born: June 6, 1971 (age 54); Brussels, Belgium
- Occupations: Comics artist; author; publisher; critic; teacher
- Known for: Co-founder of La Cinquième Couche; Graham Schalken l'Inconsolé; Konvalescens
- Website: grandpapier.org/-christophe-poot-

Christophe Poot (born 6 June 1971 in Brussels) is a Belgian comics artist, author, publisher, and critic. He is a co-founder of the independent publishing house La Cinquième Couche and the founder of the micro-imprint Nu-Tête. He is known for a small but highly distinctive body of work characterised by an expressive, laconically drawn style, with literary influences drawn from Eugène Delacroix and Gustave Flaubert.

== Biography ==
=== Training and early career ===
Poot was born on 6 June 1971 in Brussels. After studying at the Institut Saint-Luc de Bruxelles, he co-founded La Cinquième Couche in 1993 alongside a group of fellow students from the school's comics workshop, including Xavier Löwenthal, and others. He contributed to all the collective issues of the journal and took part in the graphic design of the collective album Le Coup de Grâce (2006).

In 1999, alongside Xavier Löwenthal, Poot participated in the Terre-Neuve project organised by the Recyclart association, aimed at transforming the urban rupture caused by the North–South railway junction in Brussels, contributing to five panels of approximately 16 square metres (170 sq ft) each.

He resigned from La Cinquième Couche in 2007 to devote himself entirely to drawing and to a major long-form narrative project. In 2008, he launched the web platform La Paroi, and in 2013 he founded the small independent imprint Nu-Tête, under which he published Magnolia Stellata (2013). He has also contributed drawings and illustrations to grandpapier.org, a platform for illustration and comics, since 2005.

Since 2011, Poot has been part of the organising committee of the Prix Fernand-Baudin, a Belgian award honouring excellence in book design in Wallonia and Brussels. He is also a critic of alternative comics for the website du9 and the magazine Gonzaï. He teaches at the ESA Saint-Luc (Brussels).

=== Artistic approach ===
In an interview with Gabriel Delmas published on du9, Poot described his approach to drawing as driven by accident and immediacy, citing Eugène Delacroix's dictum that one must be able to draw a man falling from a roof. He considers his published output rare and deliberately slow, describing himself as a draughtsman with an "erratic rhythm".

His major long-form work, the Graham Schalken cycle, was conceived as a romantic narrative following a pianist through New York and Stockholm, drawing on literary references including Gustave Flaubert and composers such as Franz Liszt.

== Publications ==
=== Solo works ===
- Cèdre et Séquoia, La Cinquième Couche, Brussels, 1999. ISBN 2-9600186-1-3.
- Hareng Couvre-Chef, La Cinquième Couche, Brussels, 2001. ISBN 978-2-960018-64-6.
- Graham Schalken, l'Inconsolé (Tunis, chapter 1), La Cinquième Couche, Brussels, June 2006. ISBN 2-930356-17-0.
- Magnolia Stellata, Nu-Tête, Brussels, 2013.
- Hareng couvre-chef et autres chansons de marins (expanded edition), La Cinquième Couche, Brussels, 4 October 2019. ISBN 978-2-39008-034-3.
- Konvalescens: Stockholm 1906, La Cinquième Couche, Brussels, 7 April 2023. ISBN 978-2-390-08088-6.

=== Collective publications ===
- Comix 2000 (collective including Christophe Poot), L'Association, Paris, December 1999. ISBN 978-2-84414-022-7.
- Le Coup de grâce (collective), La Cinquième Couche, Brussels, 26 August 2006. ISBN 978-2-930356-29-7.
- 40 075 km comics (collective including Christophe Poot), L'Employé du Moi, Brussels, January 2007. ISBN 978-2-930360-13-3.
- Suisse – Belgique (collective including Christophe Poot), Castagniééé, Vevey, May 2008. ISBN 978-2-940346-28-8.
- Ainsi, dire (with Éric Lambé and Florian Huet; scenario by Erwin Dejasse), Wittockiana, Brussels, 2018. ISBN 978-2-87305-003-0. (Note: Catalogue of the exhibition Ainsi, dire at the Bibliothèque Wittockiana, Brussels, 29 September 2018 – 20 January 2019.)

== Exhibitions ==
- Louisiana Manifest (collaboration with the Jean Nouvel workshops), Louisiana Museum of Modern Art, Humlebæk, 6 June – 18 September 2005.
- Bruxelles, objectif BD, Galerie Petits Papiers, Brussels, 8–17 September 2009.
- Ainsi, dire, Bibliothèque Wittockiana, Brussels, 29 September 2018 – 20 January 2019.
