= Ilan Manouach =

Belgian artist (born 1980)

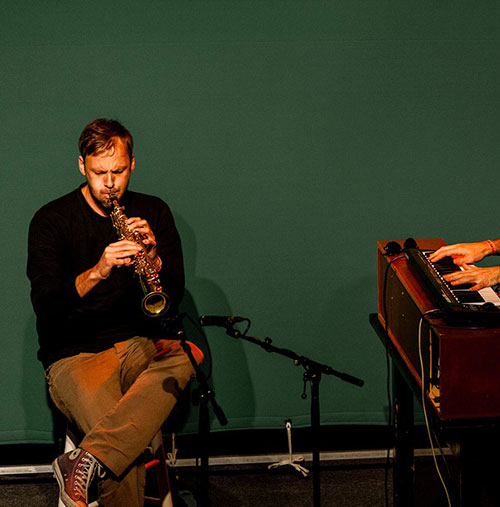
- Live at the Mississippi Studios in Portland
- Born: July 11, 1980 (age 46); Athens, Greece
- Known for: Visual artist, publisher, musician,
- Website: ilanmanouach.com

Ilan Manouach (born 11 July 1980) is a Greek-born, Brussels-based comics artist, researcher and publisher, known for conceptual comics that rework existing works and for Shapereader, a tactile system of comics for blind readers. His work is the subject of a critical anthology, Ilan Manouach in Review (Routledge, 2023). He holds a PhD from Aalto University (2022), was a postdoctoral fellow of the F.R.S.-FNRS at the University of Liège, and is principal investigator of The Knowledge Codex, a project on comics and climate representation funded by the Swedish Research Council at Uppsala University. He founded the Greek press Topovoros Books and the Brussels non-profit Echo Chamber.

== Early life and education ==
Manouach was born in Athens on 11 July 1980. He trained at the École supérieure des arts Saint-Luc in Brussels (BFA, 2001), took an MA at the Dutch Art Institute in Arnhem (2017), and in April 2022 defended an article-based doctorate, Estranging Comics: Towards a Novel Comics Praxeology, at Aalto University's School of Arts, Design and Architecture, with Jan Baetens as opponent and Craig Dworkin as thesis advisor. The thesis received the School of Arts, Design and Architecture's Dissertation Award 2022.

== Comics ==
=== Early books ===
Manouach's first book, Les lieux et les choses qui entouraient les gens, désormais, appeared with the Brussels independent press La Cinquième Couche in 2003, and most of his later books were published there. Thierry Groensteen discussed his early narrative work in Bande dessinée et narration (2011), comparing its construction to jazz improvisation. Frag (2008) was the last of these narrative books; commissioned works of the period include Écologie forcée for the Biennale d'art contemporain du Havre (2010) and Les deux côtés d'un mur for the Sierre comics festival (2011).

=== Appropriations ===
From 2011 Manouach produced a series of unsigned reworkings of canonical comics, issued in La Cinquième Couche's Essaim collection.

Katz (printed November 2011) reproduces the French edition of Art Spiegelman's Maus with every character redrawn as a cat. It was first shown at the Angoulême International Comics Festival in January 2012, the year Spiegelman presided over the festival. Flammarion, Spiegelman's French publisher, filed a counterfeiting complaint in February 2012; the case came before the Paris tribunal in March and was settled with La Cinquième Couche agreeing to pulp the remaining copies. MetaKatz (2013) collected essays and documents on the affair.

Noirs (2014) is a facsimile of Peyo's Les Schtroumpfs noirs printed with all four offset plates in cyan, so that the whole book appears blue. Tintin Akei Kongo (2015, co-published with the Lisbon press MMMNNNRRRG) is a facsimile of Hergé's Tintin in the Congo translated into Lingala, a language in which the album had never been published. Riki Fermier (2015) removes every character except the pelican Riki from an album of the Danish series Petzi. Cascão (2019) bleaches pages of the Brazilian magazine Turma da Mônica.

Bill Kartalopoulos, writing in World Literature Today in 2016, characterised this body of work as "defamiliarizing comics". The Comics Journal has covered it in an overview of Manouach's "expanded comics" (2021) and a long interview (2025).

=== Shapereader ===
Shapereader is a tactile language for comics built from raised ideograms, or "tactigrams", standing for characters, objects, actions and emotions. Manouach conceived it during a 2013 residency at the Saari Residence in Finland; the Kone Foundation funded it that year, and the first work in the system, the 57-plate tactile novel Arctic Circle, was completed in 2014. The project was covered by Hyperallergic, The Cut, Wired (Germany), Fast Company, Le Monde and ActuaLitté in 2016, presented at the Angoulême festival and the Onassis Cultural Centre, and exhibited at Photographic Gallery Hippolyte, Helsinki, in 2017. Manouach published an account of the system in Leonardo in 2022.

=== Distributed labour and synthetic comics ===
Harvested (2016), an anthology of 500 artworks glimpsed in the sets of adult films, was assembled by scripts and sorted by crowdsourced microworkers, and issued as a ten-publisher co-edition. The Cubicle Island (2020) reprints desert-island cartoons from The New Yorker with new captions written by microworkers hired through Amazon Mechanical Turk. Peanuts minus Schulz (JBE Books, 2021) assembles Peanuts strips redrawn by more than a thousand microworkers from twenty countries; it was reviewed in The Comics Journal and by Jan Baetens in Leonardo Reviews, and Manouach described the method in The Comics Grid (2019).

The Neural Yorker (2019–2023), made with the engineer Yannis Siglidis, was a Twitter bot posting cartoons generated by machine-learning models trained on New Yorker cartoons and captions; Hyperallergic covered it in 2021. Fastwalkers (2021) is a comic whose images and text were generated with GAN and GPT-3 models; Manouach and Barbara Postema analysed its production in Critical Humanities (2024), and Miguel Peña Méndez in CuCo, Cuadernos de cómic (2024).

ONEPIECE (JBE Books, 2022) binds the 102 volumes of Eiichiro Oda's One Piece into a single 21,450-page book, issued in an edition of 50 as a sculptural object that cannot be read; The Guardian, Artnet News and IGN reported on it.

Tarwar (2025) is composed entirely of black panels selected by computer vision from digitised comics of many traditions; it was co-published in Belgium, Italy, Sweden, Portugal and Greece and reviewed in Efimerida ton Syntakton. Recent books also include Reading (Lendroit, 2024) and Lu X and Lu 0 (2024), which empty the Little Lulu strips of their characters.

== Research ==
Manouach's doctoral publications include "Outlining Conceptual Practices in Comics" (European Comic Art, 2021) and "Comic Books as Ontographs" (Cuadernos del Centro de Estudios en Diseño y Comunicación, 2021). He was an F.R.S.-FNRS postdoctoral fellow at the University of Liège (2023–2026), a visiting scholar at Harvard's metaLAB (2022–2025) and an affiliate of the Laboratoire Paragraphe at Paris 8 University. From 2026 he leads The Knowledge Codex: Comics as Expansive Graphic Repositories at Uppsala University, funded by the Swedish Research Council (2026–2029), and is a co-investigator on Synthetic Pasts, funded by the Marcus and Amalia Wallenberg Foundation. With Anna Foka he published "Comics as Heritage" in Heritage (2025).

== Publishing and organisations ==
In 2012 Manouach founded Topovoros Books, an Athens press of which he is editorial director, publishing Greek translations of contemporary theory and political writing. Its list of some fifty titles includes Donna Haraway's A Cyborg Manifesto, Valerie Solanas's SCUM Manifesto, Mike Davis's Dead Cities, Eyal Weizman's Walking Through Walls, Hélène Cixous's The Laugh of the Medusa, Eve Kosofsky Sedgwick's "Paranoid Reading and Reparative Reading", Byung-Chul Han's Shanzhai, McKenzie Wark's Capital Is Dead, Hito Steyerl's The Wretched of the Screen, Benjamin Bratton's Terraforming, Steven Shaviro's essays on accelerationism, Laboria Cuboniks's Xenofeminist Manifesto, Evgeny Morozov's The Santiago Boys, and Kenneth Goldsmith's Duchamp Is My Lawyer, as well as texts by Craig Dworkin, Anne Fausto-Sterling, Christine Delphy, Françoise Vergès, Saidiya Hartman, Bobby Seale, Marek Edelman, Guy Hocquenghem, Tiziana Terranova, Joanna Zylinska, Laurent de Sutter and the KLF. In 2017 he founded Echo Chamber, a Brussels non-profit for comics research. Echo Chamber was one of four partners, with the Institute of Network Cultures (Amsterdam), Aksioma (Ljubljana) and NERO Editions (Rome), in .expub | Exploring Expanded Publishing, a two-year Creative Europe project (2023–2025) whose closing book includes an essay by Manouach. With Kenneth Goldsmith he curated Shadow Libraries: UbuWeb in Athens at the Onassis Cultural Centre in 2018, and he maintains the Conceptual Comics collections on UbuWeb and Monoskop. He edited Chimeras: Inventory of Synthetic Cognition (Onassis Publications, 2022), has served as an appointed expert on the comics industry for the Belgian government and as a strategy consultant to the Onassis Foundation.

== Editorial work ==
With Anna Engelhardt, Manouach edited Chimeras: Inventory of Synthetic Cognition (Onassis Foundation, Athens, 2022), an open-access glossary on artificial intelligence with some 150 contributors, among them !Mediengruppe Bitnik, K Allado-McDowell, Jamie Allen, Clemens Apprich, Tega Brain, Vera Bühlmann, Mercedes Bunz, Florian Cramer, Matt Colquhoun, Laurent de Sutter, José Luis de Vicente and Patricia Reed. He edited the two-volume Limbo (2011) and, with Xavier Löwenthal, the anthology Le Coup de Grâce (2006) for La Cinquième Couche, and Η χρυσή εποχή… (Kormoranos, 2007). In 2023 he and Benoît Crucifix issued a call for an edited volume on comics and computation; the resulting book, Synthetic Comics: Computation, Standardization, Automation, is announced by De Gruyter.

In April 2026 he organised COMMA (Comics and Machines), an international conference held at the KTH Royal Institute of Technology in Stockholm and Uppsala University.

== Music ==
Manouach plays saxophone and has recorded as one half of the Athens noise duo Balinese Beast (with Giorgos Axiotis), in Glacial, an electronic-jazz project with the producer Giorgos Lemos that has released on the Hôtel Costes series, and with the Swiss accordionist Jonas Kocher in duo and trio formats on the Bruit label.

=== Discography ===
- Untitled (A Question of Re-Entry, 2009)
- Jeez Clusters Joys (Triple Bath, 2009)
- Balinese Beast, Balinese Beast, LP, self-released (BB001), April 2011, edition of 287
- Balinese Beast, Soft Offerings, 7", self-released (BB002), 2011
- Glacial, Costes présente… Glacial (Welcome to Masomenos, 25 January 2012)
- Various, Sonic Protest 2012, 2×CD compilation (Sonic Protest / Bimbo Tower, 2012), track "Pale Deposit"
- Balinese Beast / Wham Jah, split LP (Phase!, 2013)
- Fusiller / Balinese Beast, Les Géométries Souterraines, split LP (TanzProcesz, 2013)
- Balinese Beast / TBC & Guy Saldanha, Thunderbird Hotel, split 7", self-released (BB004), 2013
- Wry Trio, Wry CD (Clamshell Records, 2013)
- Romvos, Undeveloped: Uncovering of a Liminal Space, single-sided 12" (Romvos RMV003, February 2014)
- Arnaud Rivière & Mario [Aspec(t)/ASpirale] / Balinese Beast, SchengenShenzhen, split LP (Phase! / Viande / More Mars, 2014)
- Glacial, Entropy EP, 12" (Six D.O.G.S. Records SDRG002, February 2015)
- Jonas Kocher & Ilan Manouach, Skeleton Drafts, CD (Bruit, 2015)
- Glacial, Hardcore Lounge EP (Equivalence, 2016)
- Kocher / Manouach / Papageorgiou (Bruit, 2016)
- Glacial, Hotel Costes Presents… Hardcore Lounge (Studio HC, 2021)

== Reception ==
Ilan Manouach in Review: Critical Approaches to his Conceptual Comics, edited by Pedro Moura, was published by Routledge in 2023 with a foreword by Kenneth Goldsmith and chapters by, among others, José Alaniz, Jan Baetens, Benoît Crucifix, Simon Grennan, Ian Hague and Daniel Worden. A French expanded edition, Le cas Manouach, is announced by the Presses universitaires de Liège for March 2027. Further scholarly treatments include Crucifix's chapter in The Oxford Handbook of Comic Book Studies (2020), Sébastien Conard in Collateral (2023), and Álvaro Pons Moreno and Noelia Ibarra-Rius in Norba (2024).

== Bibliography ==
=== Books ===
- Les lieux et les choses qui entouraient les gens, désormais. Brussels: La Cinquième Couche, 2003. ISBN 978-2-930356-03-7. doi:10.5281/zenodo.12703921
- La Mort du Cycliste. La Cinquième Couche, 2004. ISBN 978-2-930356-12-9. doi:10.5281/zenodo.12703837
- Arbres en plastique, feuilles en papier (ed.). La Cinquième Couche, 2006. ISBN 978-2-930356-19-8. doi:10.5281/zenodo.12703858
- Le Coup de Grâce (ed., with Xavier Löwenthal). La Cinquième Couche, 2006. ISBN 978-2-930356-29-7. doi:10.5281/zenodo.11394381
- Η χρυσή εποχή και τα τοπία κενοτάφια… (ed.). Athens: Kormoranos, 2007. ISBN 978-960-89659-0-4. doi:10.5281/zenodo.14639836
- Frag. La Cinquième Couche, 2008. ISBN 978-2-930356-18-1. doi:10.5281/zenodo.12703789
- Écologie forcée. La Cinquième Couche, 2011. ISBN 978-2-930356-79-2. doi:10.5281/zenodo.12703981
- Les deux côtés d'un mur. La Cinquième Couche, 2011. ISBN 978-2-930356-83-9. doi:10.5281/zenodo.12703993
- Limbo (sketchbook / textbook, ed.). La Cinquième Couche, 2011. ISBN 978-2-930356-62-4 / 978-2-930356-63-1. doi:10.5281/zenodo.12703945
- Katz. La Cinquième Couche, 2012. ISBN 978-2-930356-84-6. doi:10.5281/zenodo.11161165
- MetaKatz. La Cinquième Couche, 2013. ISBN 978-2-930356-90-7. doi:10.5281/zenodo.11353967
- Noirs. La Cinquième Couche, 2014. No ISBN. doi:10.5281/zenodo.11121750
- Tintin Akei Kongo. Brussels / Lisbon: La Cinquième Couche / MMMNNNRRRG, 2015. 64 pp. No ISBN. doi:10.5281/zenodo.11160817
- Riki Fermier. La Cinquième Couche, 2015. 32 pp. ISBN 978-2-39008-099-2. doi:10.5281/zenodo.11353666
- Harvested. Co-published by La Cinquième Couche (Belgium), Lendroit éditions (France), Hélice Hélas (Switzerland), MMMNNNRRRG (Portugal), Forlaens (Denmark), Topovoros (Greece), Fortepressa (Italy), Ediciones Valientes (Spain), Pachiclon (Mexico) and Bitterkomix (South Africa), 2016. 504 pp., 1,000 copies. ISBN 978-2-917427-70-5. doi:10.5281/zenodo.11354609
- Blanco. La Cinquième Couche, 2018. ISBN 978-2-39008-043-5. doi:10.5281/zenodo.11354827
- Compendium of Franco-Belgian Comics / Abrégé de bande dessinée franco-belge. Co-published by La Cinquième Couche (Belgium), Lendroit éditions (France), Hélice Hélas (Switzerland), Forlaens (Denmark), Topovoros (Greece), Fortepressa (Italy), Antilope (Brazil) and Gnat (Israel), 2018. 50 pp., 500 copies. ISBN 978-2-37751-007-8 (Lendroit) / 978-2-39008-018-3 (La Cinquième Couche). doi:10.5281/zenodo.11149392
- Cascão. Brussels: La Cinquième Couche / La Crypte Tonique, 2019. No ISBN. doi:10.5281/zenodo.11353502
- The Cubicle Island: Pirates, Microworkers, Spambots and the Venatic Lore of Clickfarm Humor. La Cinquième Couche, 2020. ISBN 978-2-39008-051-0. doi:10.5281/zenodo.11160959
- Peanuts minus Schulz: Distributed Labor as a Compositional Practice. Paris: JBE Books, 2021. 700 pp. ISBN 978-2-36568-030-1. doi:10.5281/zenodo.11161034
- Fastwalkers. La Cinquième Couche (with Chili Com Carne, D Editore, Fortepressa, Topovoros), 2021. ISBN 978-2-39008-086-2. doi:10.5281/zenodo.11354716
- ONEPIECE. JBE Books, 2022. Edition of 50. No ISBN. doi:10.5281/zenodo.11355097
- Le VTT comme je l'aime. Paris: BDCUL, 2022. ISBN 979-10-92775-42-6. doi:10.5281/zenodo.11355025
- Out Side: Between Art and Hallucination (with K Allado-McDowell). JBE Books, 2024. ISBN 978-2-36568-079-0. doi:10.5281/zenodo.11355160
- Reading. Rennes: Lendroit, 2024. ISBN 978-2-39008-097-8. doi:10.5281/zenodo.11354959
- Lu X. La Cinquième Couche, 2024. ISBN 978-2-39008-102-9. doi:10.5281/zenodo.15911072
- Lu 0. La Cinquième Couche, November 2024. ISBN 978-2-39008-112-8. doi:10.5281/zenodo.15910599
- Brother: What Is Program? How to Use Your Machine (with Antoine Graff). La Cinquième Couche, 2025. ISBN 978-2-39008-110-4.
- La ballade de la mer sale. La Cinquième Couche, 2020. doi:10.5281/zenodo.11160479
- Tarwar. La Cinquième Couche (ISBN 978-2-39008-122-7) / NERO Editions (ISBN 978-88-8056-299-3) / Lystring Förlag / Chili Com Carne / Inkpress–Kormoranos (ISBN 978-960-89659-8-0), 2025. 120 pp. doi:10.5281/zenodo.11119240

=== Selected articles ===
- "Peanuts minus Schulz: Distributed Labor as a Compositional Practice". The Comics Grid 9 (2019). doi:10.16995/cg.139.
- "Outlining Conceptual Practices in Comics". European Comic Art 14.2 (2021). doi:10.3167/eca.2021.140206.
- "Comic Books as Ontographs: The Composition Process of Abrégé de bande dessinée franco-belge". Cuadernos del Centro de Estudios en Diseño y Comunicación 125 (2021). doi:10.18682/cdc.vi125.4553.
- "The Tactile Comics of Shapereader". Leonardo 55.3 (2022): 291–296.
- "Comics as Big Data: The Transformation of Comics into Machine-Interpretable Information". Electronic Book Review (2024). https://electronicbookreview.com/publications/comics-as-big-data-the-transformation-of-comics-into-machine-interpretable-information/
- (with Barbara Postema) "'The Hard Work of Programming Germinates Soft Pleasures': Creating Synthetic Comics with AI Collaboration". Critical Humanities 2.2 (2024): 156–165. doi:10.33470/2836-3140.1053.
- "Generative Palimpsests: The Feature Space of Synthetic Comics". EVA Berlin 2025: Electronic Media and Visual Arts, ed. Dominik Lengyel (arthistoricum.net, 2025), 33–34. doi:10.11588/arthistoricum.1568.c24035.
- "From Prelims to Feature Spaces: Rethinking Comics Prototyping in the Age of AI". European Comic Art 19.1 (2026). doi:10.3167/eca.2026.190102
- (with Anne Deneuville and Laurence Allard) "Ilan Manouach: la bande dessinée comme infrastructure". Multitudes (2026). HAL: hal-05684427.
- (with Anna Foka) "Comics as Heritage: Theorizing Digital Futures of Vernacular Expression". Heritage 8.8 (2025): 295. doi:10.3390/heritage8080295.

=== Edited volumes ===
- (with Anna Engelhardt) Chimeras: Inventory of Synthetic Cognition. Athens: Onassis Foundation, 2022. ISBN 978-618-85361-8-0. doi:10.5281/zenodo.11262432
- Limbo (sketchbook / textbook). La Cinquième Couche, 2011. ISBN 978-2-930356-62-4 / 978-2-930356-63-1.
- Η χρυσή εποχή και τα τοπία κενοτάφια…. Kormoranos, 2007. ISBN 978-960-89659-0-4.
- (with Xavier Löwenthal) Le Coup de Grâce. La Cinquième Couche, 2006. ISBN 978-2-930356-29-7.
- Arbres en plastique, feuilles en papier. La Cinquième Couche, 2006. ISBN 978-2-930356-19-8.

=== Works about Manouach ===
- Moura, Pedro (ed.). Ilan Manouach in Review: Critical Approaches to his Conceptual Comics. Routledge, 2023. ISBN 978-1-032-45005-6 (hbk), 978-1-032-39971-3 (pbk/ebk).
- Moura, Pedro (ed.). Le cas Manouach. Bande dessinée conceptuelle : détournement, appropriation, art synthétique, intelligence artificielle et distribuée. Presses universitaires de Liège / La Cinquième Couche / Echo Chamber, forthcoming March 2027. ISBN 978-2-39008-127-2.
