= William Henne =

Belgian comics author, filmmaker, publisher and producer

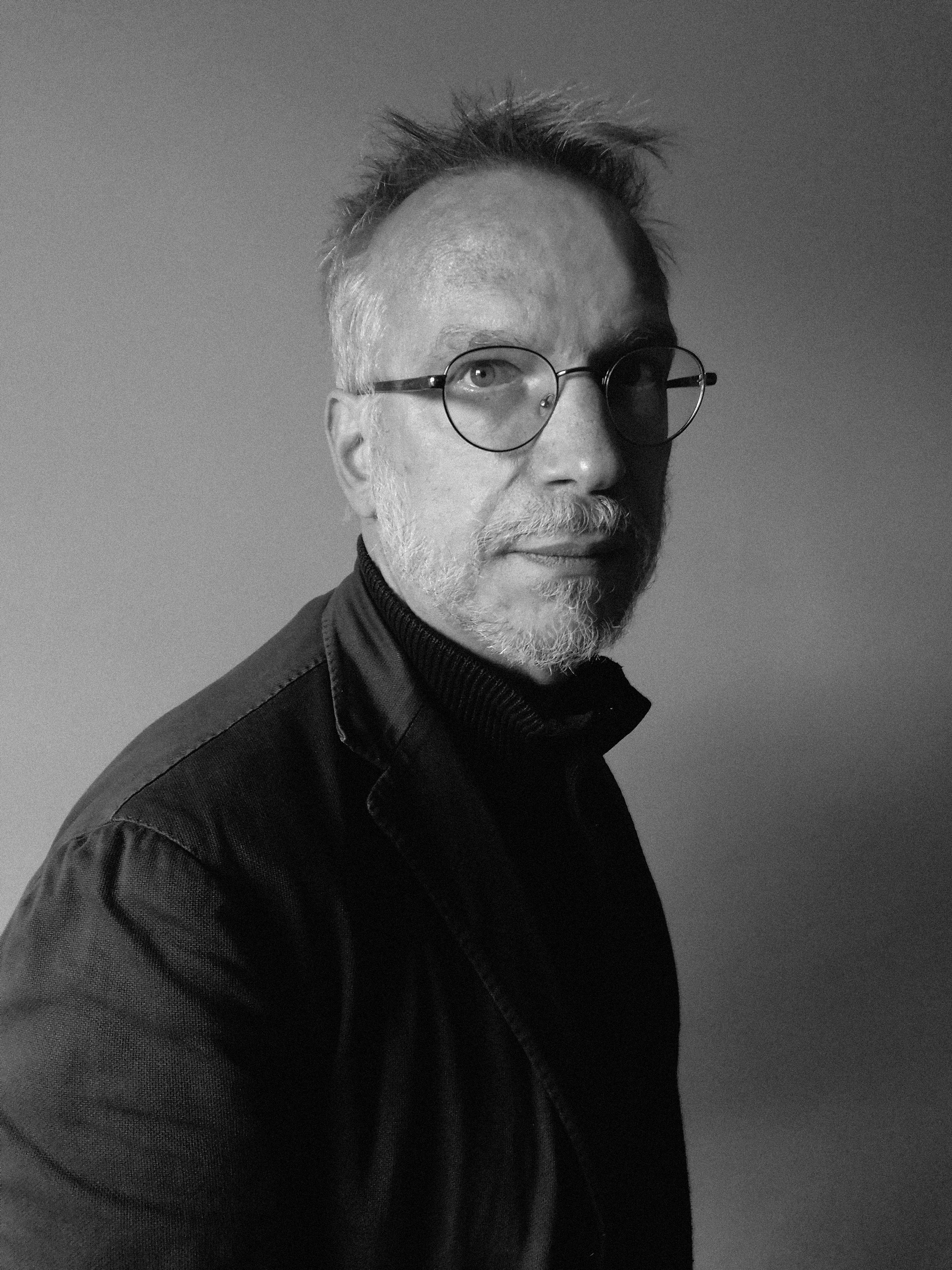
- William Henne
- Born: June 11, 1969 (age 57); Ixelles, Brussels, Belgium
- Occupations: Comics author; filmmaker; publisher; producer; social worker
- Known for: Co-director of La Cinquième Couche; co-founder of Zorobabel
- Website: 5c.be

William Henne (born 11 June 1969 in Ixelles, Brussels) is a Belgian comics author, filmmaker, animator, publisher, producer, and social worker. He is the co-director of the independent publishing house La Cinquième Couche and co-founder of the animation studio Zorobabel.

== Biography ==
Henne was born on 11 June 1969 in Ixelles, a municipality of Brussels. In 1994, he co-founded the animation studio Zorobabel with filmmaker Delphine Renard, which functions as both a professional production house for animated short films and a centre for animation workshops. From 1997 to 2018, he coordinated the studio's Atelier Collectif, a participatory filmmaking workshop operating on a principle of collective co-authorship, which produced around forty short films.

In 1994, he self-published his first comics collection, L'Épuisement. He joined the La Cinquième Couche collective in 1998, and from around 2000 onwards, and co-directs the group with Xavier Löwenthal.

Together with Löwenthal and Thomas Boivin, Henne is widely considered one of the principal figures behind the pen name Judith Forest, under which the autobiographical comics 1h25 (2009) and Momon (2011) were published at La Cinquième Couche.

He has also worked as a social worker and video educator in priority education zone schools in Saint-Gilles.

From 2023 onwards, Henne has worked with Löwenthal on the posthumous edition of the work of Chaïm Kaliski at La Cinquième Couche. He served as one of the advisers for the major retrospective exhibition of Kaliski's work at the Musée d'art et d'histoire du Judaïsme in Paris (January 2026).

In 2024, with Portuguese filmmaker Zepe, he co-founded the experimental animation platform Beat Bit.

== Comics ==
=== Solo works ===
- L'Épuisement, Zorobabel, Brussels, 1994, 27 p.
- Le Poulpe: La Disparition de Perek (after Hervé Le Tellier), 6 pieds sous terre, Montpellier, 2001, 64 p. ISBN 2-910431-23-1.
- La Poursuite [découpage], La Cinquième Couche, coll. "Extracteur", Brussels, 2001, 64 p. ISBN 2-9600-1863-X.
- L'Annonceur, La Cinquième Couche, coll. "F.", Brussels, 2003, 40 p. ISBN 2-930356-02-2.
- La Station, La Cinquième Couche, coll. "Extracteur", Brussels, 2004, 128 p. ISBN 978-2-930356-10-5.
- La Régression (scenario; drawings by François Olislaeger), La Cinquième Couche, Brussels, 2005, 40 p. ISBN 2-930356-06-5.
- La Permutation [Errata], La Cinquième Couche, coll. "Extracteur", Brussels, 2006, 64 p. ISBN 2-930356-30-8.
- Les Songes [Reliefs], La Cinquième Couche, Brussels, 2009, 100 p. ISBN 978-2-930356-47-1. Reissued 2017. ISBN 978-2-390-08015-2.
- L'Hôte [Été 1977], La Cinquième Couche, coll. "Point Métal", Brussels, 2012, 40 p. ISBN 978-2-930356-85-3.
- La Poursuite [contre-sens], La Cinquième Couche, Brussels, 2014, 56 p. ISBN 978-2-930356-97-6.
- Les Mensonges (et autres tentatives) (archive 1992–2012), La Cinquième Couche, Brussels, 2014, 640 p.
- Djihad blues (with Yann Bonnin), La Cinquième Couche, Brussels, 2017, 176 p. ISBN 978-2-390-08037-4.
- La Marque Jaune, La Cinquième Couche, Brussels, 2022, 120 p. ISBN 978-2-390-08083-1.

=== Under the pen name Judith Forest ===
- 1h25 (with Xavier Löwenthal and Thomas Boivin, under the pen name Judith Forest), La Cinquième Couche, coll. "Extracteur", Brussels, 2009, 304 p. ISBN 978-2-930356-68-6.
- Momon (with Xavier Löwenthal and Thomas Boivin, under the pen name Judith Forest), La Cinquième Couche, coll. "Extracteur", Brussels, 2011, 96 p. ISBN 978-2-930356-76-1.
- Journaux (with Xavier Löwenthal), La Cinquième Couche, Brussels, 2018, 500 p. ISBN 978-2-390-08045-9.
- Sexe, mensonges et édition (with Xavier Löwenthal), La Cinquième Couche, Brussels, 2021, 32 p. ISBN 978-2-390-08068-8.
- Strip (with Xavier Löwenthal), La Cinquième Couche, Brussels, 2025, 24 p. ISBN 978-2-390-08109-8.

=== Under the pen name The Stealth Group ===
- Le Capitalisme à portée de main (with Xavier Löwenthal), La Cinquième Couche / Hélice-Hélas, Brussels / Vevey, 2017, 204 p. ISBN 978-2-390-08016-9.

=== Conceptual books and détournements (with Xavier Löwenthal) ===
- Astro Boy #6, La Cinquième Couche, Brussels, 2020, 240 p. ISBN 978-2-39008-061-9.
- The Dark Knight Returns Book, La Cinquième Couche, Brussels, 2021, 352 p. ISBN 978-2-39008-070-1.
- Les Raisons de la colère, La Cinquième Couche, Brussels, 2023, 36 p.

=== Editions of Chaïm Kaliski's work ===
From 2023 onwards, Henne and Xavier Löwenthal have edited and published the works of Chaïm Kaliski at La Cinquième Couche:

- Jim d'Etterbeek, La Cinquième Couche, Brussels, 2024. ISBN 978-2-390-08085-5.
- Dossin, La Cinquième Couche, Brussels, 2025. ISBN 978-2-390-08119-7.
- Le Génocide des Juifs d'Europe, La Cinquième Couche, Brussels, 2026.

=== Collective publications ===
- Comix 2000 (collective including William Henne), L'Association, Paris, 1999. ISBN 978-2-84414-022-7.
- Le Coup de grâce (collective), La Cinquième Couche, coll. "F", Brussels, 2006. ISBN 978-2-930356-29-7.
- Bruxelles stories (scenario by Patrick van Roy; collective illustrations including William Henne), Zanpano, Paris, 2009. ISBN 978-2-915757-18-7.

== Filmography ==
=== As director ===
All films made with the Atelier Collectif unless otherwise noted.

- 1997: Tout jeune garçon, animation, 7 min, painted animation, 16 mm.
- 2000: Barbe Bleue (Blue Beard), animation, 15 min, stop motion, 35 mm.
- 2002: Le Petit Théâtre mécanique, animation, 7 min 30 s, stop motion, 35 mm.
- 2003: Le Complot de famille, animation, 6 min, stop motion, 35 mm.
- 2004: Jan Hermann, animation, 9 min, stop motion, 35 mm.
- 2005: Transit, animation and documentary, 24 min, mixed techniques, HD.
- 2006: Otomi, animation, 9 min, stop motion, 35 mm.
- 2007: La Diagramme du migrant, animation, 2 min, Flash.
- 2008: Déjà vu, animation, 19 min 57 s, stop motion, 35 mm.
- 2009: Kill the surfers, animation, 3 min 23 s, stop motion, HD.
- 2010: L'Affaire Ginzhu, animation, 16 min 20 s, stop motion, HD.
- 2011: Kimiko, animation, 3 min 30 s, stop motion, HD.
- 2011: Kin, animation, 11 min, stop motion, 35 mm.
- 2011: Pigmaleón, animation, 4 min 45 s, stop motion, HD.
- 2013: Quand j'étais petit, je croyais que…, animation, 52 × 45 s, HD.
- 2014: La Chair (The Flesh) (with Louise Lemoine Torrès), animation, 15 min, DCP.
- 2015: The Opening, animation, 6 min 5 s, DCP.
- 2016: No-go zone, animation, 10 min, DCP.
- 2016: Inhibitum, animation, 8 min, DCP.
- 2016: Scraps, animation, 5 min 51 s, DCP.
- 2017: KL (with Yann Bonnin), animation, 3 min 30 s, DCP.
- 2017: Biophonie, animation, 2 min 31 s, DCP.
- 2017: C'est comme des gens normaux, animation, 3 min 40 s, DCP.
- 2018: La Vigie, animation, 9 min 17 s, DCP.
- 2018: Le Poisson fidèle, animation, 7 min 40 s, DCP.
- 2022: Alex Barbier : portraits (with Laura Petitjean), documentary, 75 min, DCP.
- 2024: Murmuziek, documentary, 54 min 31 s, DCP.

== Awards ==
- 2001: Prix Cinergie, 20th Anima festival, Brussels, for Barbe Bleue.
- 2002: Best short film, 24th Festival du Film Indépendant, Brussels, for Le Petit Théâtre mécanique (shared with Simon Elst, Lamya Amrani, Laurence Leplae).
- 2002: Audience prize, Festival du Film de Vendôme, for Le Petit Théâtre mécanique.
- 2003: Prix de la SABAM, 23rd Anima, Brussels, for Le Petit Théâtre mécanique.
- 2003: Special jury prize, Goldfish International Children's Animation Film Festival, Moscow, for Le Petit Théâtre mécanique.
- 2004: Grand Prix Anima, Communauté Française, Brussels, for Jan Hermann.
- 2006: Grand Prix Award, Akira Kurosawa Memorial Short Film Competition, Imari, Japan, for Otomi.
- 2011: Prix de la RTBF, Anima festival, Brussels, for Kin.
- 2011: Grand Prix, Anima festival, Communauté Française, Brussels, for Kin.
- 2022: Film on Art Prize, Brussels Art Film Festival, for Alex Barbier : portraits.
