= Chaïm Kaliski =

Belgian artist and comics author, Holocaust witness (1929–2015)

- Born: Haïm-Charles Kaliski; December 25, 1929; Etterbeek, Province of Brabant, Belgium
- Died: September 12, 2015 (aged 85)
- Other names: Jim Kaliski; Jim d'Etterbeek; Ch. Kaliski
- Occupations: Artist; comics author
- Known for: Graphic chronicle of the Holocaust in Brussels
- Relatives: René Kalisky (brother); Jonathan Zaccaï (nephew)

Chaïm Kaliski (25 December 1929 – 12 September 2015), also known as Jim Kaliski or Jim d'Etterbeek, was a Belgian artist and comics author. Born into a modest Polish-Jewish family in Etterbeek, Brussels, he was deeply marked by the Holocaust, having lived through the Nazi occupation of Belgium as a hidden Jewish child. From the age of 60, he created an extraordinary self-taught graphic chronicle of that experience, producing more than 6,000 drawings and pages over eighteen years. He was the brother of playwright René Kalisky and the uncle of actor Jonathan Zaccaï.

== Biography ==
=== Early years ===
Haïm-Charles Kaliski was born on 25 December 1929 in Etterbeek. He came from a modest Polish-Jewish family: his father Avram (Abraham) was a leather-goods maker and his mother, Fradla Wach (born 15 November 1901 in Warsaw), was a seamstress and illiterate. He was the eldest of four children: René, who would become a writer and playwright under the name René Kalisky; Sarah Kaliski (1941–2010), who became a painter; and Ida Kaliski (born 1933), who nearly became an opera singer. He grew up in Cureghem, a neighbourhood of Anderlecht, near Brussels-Midi station.

The outbreak of World War II and the German invasion of Belgium in May 1940 upended his family's existence. The advance of the Wehrmacht led the family to flee towards France, but lacking the financial means, the Kaliskis returned to the Belgian capital. The family was registered in the Jewish register of Belgium on 24 December 1940. Kaliski was forced to interrupt his schooling and lived through the relentless persecution of Brussels Jews during the German Occupation, evading controls and denunciations. The street where he lived, rue Docteur De Meersman, was spared during the roundup of Brussels Jews on 3 September 1942. His father Abraham was arrested on 12 February 1944. His mother then managed to place her younger children in separate hiding places while she concealed herself with Chaïm until the Liberation in September 1944.

=== Disappearance of his father ===
Abraham was imprisoned at Saint-Gilles Prison, where he was tortured to make him reveal the address of his hidden children. Having said nothing, he was transferred to the Dossin barracks in Mechelen and deported on 7 April 1944 to Auschwitz, from which he would never return. Chaïm Kaliski, "Jim", had to provide for his family and worked in the leather trade. The brutal disappearance of his father and the extermination of the Jews left him deeply traumatised. The family, reunited by his mother, lived in a modest neighbourhood of Etterbeek.

From the Liberation onwards, Chaïm — also known as Charles or Jim d'Etterbeek — continuously cut out images of Nazi atrocities and pasted them into notebooks that foreshadowed his later narratives. He collected press clippings and documented himself assiduously throughout the postwar years. According to curator Virginie Michel: "Probably affected by an autistic disorder, he received a disability pension which allowed him to devote himself to his story, which he would revisit throughout his entire life."

=== Graphic chronicle of the Holocaust in Brussels ===
At the age of 60, at the instigation of his sister Sarah, Kaliski began to create a self-taught representation of the Holocaust, combining pen-and-ink drawing with watercolour painting and using India ink for his writing. His journey as a Jewish child hidden in Brussels during the war forms the backbone of his entire body of work. Kaliski's meticulous, obsessive, almost compulsive chronicle of a stolen childhood, spanning from the 1920s through the postwar period, explores Etterbeek as well as other Brussels municipalities: Anderlecht, Ixelles, Saint-Gilles, and Schaerbeek.

He extended the scope of his work as a memorist to depict other massacres and exterminations, including the Armenian genocide, the Tutsi genocide, and the Katyn massacre. With Le Siècle des génocides, a publication produced for the exhibition Un siècle de génocides at La Maison du livre in Saint-Gilles (4–27 February 1999), Kaliski placed himself among the earliest comics artists to address the subject of the Holocaust. He also treated lighter subjects, including the lives of Jacques Brel and Johnny Hallyday.

In total he produced more than 6,000 drawings and pages, generally on Canson A3 paper, signed and dated over a period of eighteen years. His work was shown only partially during his lifetime, notably at the Jewish Museum of Belgium in 2007, as part of an exhibition dedicated to three artists of the Kaliski family, and in exhibitions devoted to outsider art curated by Erwin Dejasse.

The work, meticulously preserved, required extensive cataloguing, sorting and digitisation before publication. It was the comics authors and publishers William Henne and Xavier Löwenthal of La Cinquième Couche who undertook this task, assembling the material into a series of four volumes with the pages presented in chronological order. Jim d'Etterbeek contains 336 pages created between 1989 and 1999, with an introduction by Joël Kotek and Didier Pasamonik. This first Memorbuch features a recurring character in the form of the informer Jacques Mousso, known as "Fat Jacques", whose true identity was Icek Glogowski, responsible for hundreds of deportations. The song Seule ce soir as performed by Léo Marjane, expressing grief and despair, runs as a refrain through his pages. The speech bubbles are written in a mixture of Yiddish, Dutch, German and French.

According to Joël Kotek: "The work as a whole is heartbreaking. It is also quite interesting to study the relationship of comics authors with their fathers. As in the work of Spiegelman or Kichka, one finds this essential bond. For Kaliski, his father seemed all-powerful, almost invulnerable. And yet he disappeared forever. For Haïm, this was an irremediable loss, a pure tragedy. This book traces part of the story of a grief that would never be resolved, especially since this autistic child was very attached to his father and never left his side."

The second volume, Dossin, antichambre de la mort, focuses on the Dossin barracks — comparable to the Drancy internment camp in France — and was published in August 2025. Its introduction was written by Laurence Schram, a doctor of the Université libre de Bruxelles and lead researcher at the Kazerne Dossin museum. These graphic novels are to be followed by further volumes titled Le Génocide des Juifs d'Europe (2026) and Auschwitz (2027).

=== Personal life ===
In 2014 he lived on avenue Brugmann in the Brussels-Capital Region. He remained unmarried throughout his life.

He died on 12 September 2015, aged 85.

=== Family ===
He was the uncle of actor, director and painter Jonathan Zaccaï.

== Artistic work ==
Kaliski signed his work as "Ch. Kaliski". He also worked in oil painting.

The 2017 Paris exhibition revealed Kaliski's little-known drawings, which, according to Daniel Couvreur, culture editor of the Brussels daily Le Soir, are filled with "tragic poetry".

In 2022, he was featured in the exhibition Art brut et bande dessinée (Outsider Art and Comics), curated by Erwin Dejasse, at the Collection de l'Art Brut in Lausanne. The exhibition catalogue was published by the Geneva imprint Atrabile. The same curator presented Off-Comics, a distinctive history of the comics medium, at the Dr. Guislain Museum in Ghent in 2024, including works by Jim Kaliski.

In 2026, the retrospective exhibition Chaïm Kaliski. Jim d'Etterbeek was held at the Musée d'Art et d'Histoire du Judaïsme in Paris. According to Didier Pasamonik: "Chaïm Kaliski did not write History: he drew it, line after line, as one engraves a memory so that it may never be erased."

== Exhibitions ==
=== Solo exhibitions ===
- Chaïm Kaliski. Jim d'Etterbeek, curated by Virginie Michel, Musée d'Art et d'Histoire du Judaïsme, Paris, 22 January – 13 December 2026. A monographic exhibition bringing together 120 drawings, photographs and archival documents.

=== Group exhibitions ===
- Sarah et ses frères, les Kaliski, une famille d'artistes témoins de l'Histoire, Jewish Museum of Belgium, Brussels, October 2007 – 24 February 2008.
- Shoah et bande dessinée (2017), Mémorial de la Shoah, Paris, 19 January 2017 – 7 January 2018 (extended from 30 October 2017). Curated by Didier Pasamonik and Joël Kotek, specialist in antisemitism. The exhibition subsequently transferred to the Kazerne Dossin Memorial, Museum and Documentation Centre in Mechelen, Belgium, 17 September 2018 – 22 April 2019.
- PsycArt, Dr. Guislain Museum, Ghent, 24 July – 12 September 2021.
- Art brut et bande dessinée, curated by Erwin Dejasse, Collection de l'Art Brut, Lausanne, 16 September 2022 – 26 February 2023.
- Off-Comics, curated by Erwin Dejasse, Dr. Guislain Museum, Ghent, 2 March – 23 June 2024.
- Aussi loin qu'ici, Volet 2, curated by Alix Hubermont and Tatiana Veress, Art et Marges Museum, Brussels, 13 November 2025 – 29 March 2026.

== Publications ==
=== Graphic novels ===
- Jim d'Etterbeek – Bruxelles, les années noires, La Cinquième Couche, Brussels, 1 June 2024. ISBN 978-2-390-08085-5. (Note: Introduction by Joël Kotek and Didier Pasamonik. Landscape format.)
- Dossin – Antichambre de la mort, La Cinquième Couche, Brussels, 15 August 2025. ISBN 978-2-390-08119-7. (Note: Introduction by Laurence Schram. Landscape format.)

=== Exhibition catalogues ===
- Un siècle de génocides, Didier Devillez, 2002 (1st ed. 1999). ISBN 978-2-87396-017-9.
- Sojcher, Jacques (ed.), Sarah et ses frères: Les Kaliski, une famille d'artistes témoins de l'Histoire, Jewish Museum of Belgium / Didier Devillez, Brussels, 2007, 119 pp. ISBN 978-2-87396-109-1.
- Kotek, Joël and Pasamonik, Didier (eds.), Shoah et bande dessinée: L'image au service de la mémoire, Denoël Graphic / Mémorial de la Shoah, Paris, 2017, 168 pp. ISBN 978-2-207-13668-3.
- Dejasse, Erwin (ed.), Art brut et bande dessinée (collective, including Jim Kaliski), Atrabile, Geneva, 16 September 2022. ISBN 978-2-88923-120-1. (Note: Comics format.)

=== Public collections ===
- Moi Jim et les dirigeants nazis, ink and coloured pencil on thick paper, black leather cover, notebook of 46 pages, 22.2 × 16 cm, c. 1980, LaM – Lille Métropole Museum of Modern, Contemporary and Outsider Art.
- Rue Gray Etterbeek juin 1944, ink on Canson-type paper, 27 × 36 cm, 1993, LaM.
- Bruxelles place Rogier octobre 1941, ink on Canson-type paper, 27 × 36 cm, 1994, LaM.

== See also ==
- Auschwitz concentration camp
- Memorbuch
- The Holocaust
- René Kalisky
- La Cinquième Couche
- Xavier Löwenthal
