= Maus =

Graphic novel by Art Spiegelman

- Cover of the first volume of Maus
- Creator: Art Spiegelman
- Date: 1991
- Page count: 296 pages
- Publisher: Pantheon Books

Original publication
- Published in: Raw
- Issues: Vol. 1 No. 2 – Vol. 2 No. 3
- Date of publication: 1980–1991

Maus, (Note: From the German word Maus [maʊ̯s] pronounced similarly to and meaning "mouse".) often published as Maus: A Survivor's Tale, is a graphic novel written and illustrated by American cartoonist Art Spiegelman, serialized from 1980 to 1991. It depicts Spiegelman interviewing his father about his experiences as a Polish Jew and Holocaust survivor. The work employs postmodern techniques and represents Jews as mice, Germans as cats, and Poles as pigs. Critics have classified Maus as memoir, biography, history, fiction, autobiography, or a mix of genres. In 1992, it became the first graphic novel to win a Pulitzer Prize.

In the frame-tale timeline in the narrative present that begins in 1978 in New York City, Spiegelman talks with his father, Vladek, about his Holocaust experiences, gathering material and information for the Maus project he is preparing. In the narrative past, Spiegelman depicts these experiences, from the years leading up to World War II to his parents' liberation from the Nazi concentration camps. Much of the story revolves around Spiegelman's troubled relationship with his father and the absence of his mother, who died by suicide when Spiegelman was 20. Her grief-stricken husband destroyed her written accounts of Auschwitz. The book uses a minimalist drawing style and displays innovation in its pacing, structure, and page layouts.

A three-page strip also called "Maus" that he made in 1972 gave Spiegelman an opportunity to interview his father about his life during World War II. The recorded interviews became the basis for the book, which Spiegelman began in 1978. He serialized Maus from 1980 until 1991 as an insert in Raw, an avant-garde comics and graphics magazine published by Spiegelman and his wife, Françoise Mouly, who also appears in Maus. A collected volume of the first six chapters that appeared in 1986, Maus I: My Father Bleeds History, brought the book mainstream attention; a second volume, Maus II: And Here My Troubles Began, collected the remaining chapters in 1991. Maus was one of the first graphic novels to receive significant academic attention in the English-speaking world.

== Synopsis ==
Most of the book weaves in and out of two timelines. In the frame tale of the narrative present, Spiegelman interviews his father, Vladek, in the Rego Park neighborhood of Queens in New York City in 1978–79. The story Vladek tells unfolds in the narrative past, which begins in the mid-1930s, and continues until the end of the Holocaust in 1945.

In Rego Park in 1958, a young Art Spiegelman is skating with his friends when he falls down and hurts himself, but his friends keep going. When he returns home, he finds his father, who asks him why he is upset, and Art tells him that his friends left him behind. His father responds in broken English, "Friends? Your friends? If you lock them together in a room with no food for a week, then you could see what it is, friends!"

As an adult, Art visits his father, from whom he has become estranged. Vladek has remarried a woman named Mala since the suicide of Art's mother Anja in 1968. Art asks Vladek to recount his Holocaust experiences. Vladek tells of his time in the Polish city of Częstochowa and how he came to marry into Anja's wealthy family in 1937 and move to Sosnowiec to become a manufacturer. Vladek begs Art not to include this in the book, and Art reluctantly agrees. Anja suffers a breakdown due to postpartum depression after giving birth to their first son Richieu, (Note: Spelled "Rysio" in Polish. "Richieu" is Spiegelman's misspelling, as he had not previously seen his brother's name written down.) and the couple go to a sanitarium in Nazi-occupied Czechoslovakia for her to recover. After they return, political and antisemitic tensions build until Vladek is drafted just before the Nazi invasion of Poland. Vladek is captured at the front and forced to work as a prisoner of war. After his release, he finds Germany has annexed Sosnowiec, and he is dropped off on the other side of the border in the German protectorate. He sneaks across the border and reunites with his family.

"Prisoner on the Hell Planet" (1973), an early, expressionistic strip about Spiegelman's mother's suicide, reprinted in Maus

During one of Art's visits, he finds that a friend of Mala's has sent the couple one of the underground comix magazines Art contributed to. Mala tries to hide it, but Vladek finds and reads it. In "Prisoner on the Hell Planet", Art is traumatized by his mother's suicide three months after his release from the mental hospital, and in the end, depicts himself behind bars saying, "You murdered me, Mommy, and left me here to take the rap!" Though it brings back painful memories, Vladek admits that dealing with the issue in such a way was for the best.

In 1943, the Nazis move the Jews of the Sosnowiec Ghetto in Srodula and march them back to Sosnowiec to work. The family splits up—Vladek and Anja send Richieu to Zawiercie to stay with an aunt for safety. As more Jews are sent from the ghettos to Auschwitz, the aunt poisons herself, her children, and Richieu to death to escape the Gestapo and not die in the gas chamber. In Srodula, many Jews build bunkers to hide from the Germans. Vladek's bunker is discovered, and he is placed into a "ghetto inside the ghetto" surrounded by barbed wire. The remnants of Vladek and Anja's family are taken away. Srodula is cleared of its Jews, except for a group Vladek hides with in another bunker. When the Germans depart, the group splits up and leaves the ghetto.

In Sosnowiec, Vladek and Anja move from one hiding place to the next, making occasional contact with other Jews in hiding. Vladek disguises himself as an ethnic Pole and hunts for provisions. The couple arrange with smugglers to escape to Hungary, but it is a trick—the Gestapo arrest them on the train (as Hungary is invaded) and take them to Auschwitz, where they are separated until after the war.

Art asks after Anja's diaries, which Vladek tells him were her account of her Holocaust experiences and the only record of what happened to her after her separation from Vladek at Auschwitz and which Vladek says she had wanted Art to read. Vladek comes to admit that he burned them after she killed herself. Art is enraged and calls Vladek a "murderer".

The story jumps to 1986 after the first six chapters of Maus have appeared in a collected edition. Art is overcome with the unexpected attention the book receives and finds himself "totally blocked". Art talks about the book with his psychiatrist Paul Pavel, a Czech Holocaust survivor. Pavel suggests that, as those who perished in the camps can never tell their stories, "maybe it's better not to have any more stories". Art replies with a quote from Samuel Beckett: "Every word is like an unnecessary stain on silence and nothingness", but then realizes, "on the other hand, he said it".

Vladek tells of his hardship in the camps, of starvation and abuse, of his resourcefulness, of avoiding the selektionen—the process by which prisoners were selected for further labor or execution. Despite the danger, Anja and Vladek exchange occasional messages. As the war progresses and the German front is pushed back, the prisoners are marched from Auschwitz in occupied Poland to Gross-Rosen within the Reich and then to Dachau, where the hardships only increase and Vladek catches typhus.

The war ends, the camp survivors are freed and Vladek and Anja reunite. The book closes with Vladek turning over in his bed as he finishes his story and telling Art, "I'm tired from talking, Richieu, and it's enough stories for now". The final image is of Vladek and Anja's tombstone—Vladek died in 1982, before the book was completed.

== Primary characters ==
Art "Artie" Spiegelman
Art (Note: Born Itzhak Avraham ben Zev; his name was changed to Arthur Isadore when he immigrated with his parents to the U.S.) (born 1948) is a cartoonist and an intellectual. Art is presented as angry and full of self-pity. He deals with his own traumas and those inherited from his parents by seeking psychiatric help, which continued after the book was completed. He has a strained relationship with his father, Vladek, by whom he feels dominated. At first, he displays little sympathy for his father's hardships, but he shows more as the narrative unfolds.
Vladek Spiegelman
Vladek (Note: Born Zev Spiegelman, with the Hebrew name Zev ben Abraham. His Polish given name was Wladislaw ("Wladislaw" and "Wladec" are the spellings Spiegelman provides; the standard Polish spellings for these names are "Władysław" and "Władek"), of which "Wladec" is a diminutive. "Vladek" is the Russian version of this name, which was picked up when the area in which Vladek lived was controlled by Russia. This spelling was chosen for Maus as it was deemed the easiest spelling for English speakers to pronounce. The German version of his name was "Wilhelm" (or "Wolf" for short), and he became William when he moved to the U.S. In writing and spoken interviews, Art consistently uses the name Vladek /vlɑːdɪk/.) (1906–1982) is a Polish Jew who survived the Holocaust and then moved to the U.S. in the early 1950s. Speaking broken English, he is presented as intelligent and resourceful, pious and moral, but also egocentric, insensitive, neurotic, stubborn and sometimes absurdly miserly—traits that greatly annoy his family. He displays racist attitudes, as when Françoise picks up an African-American hitchhiker, who he fears will rob them. He shows little insight into his own racist comments about others in comparison to his treatment during the Holocaust.
Mala Spiegelman
Mala (1917–2007) is Vladek's second wife. Vladek makes her feel that she can never live up to Anja. Though she too is a survivor and speaks with Art throughout the book, Art makes no attempt to learn of her Holocaust experience.
Anna "Anja" Spiegelman
Also a Polish Jew who has survived the Holocaust, Anja (Note: Born Andzia Zylberberg, with the Hebrew name Hannah. Her name became Anna when she and Vladek arrived in the U.S.) (1912–1968) is Art's mother and Vladek's first wife. Nervous, compliant and clinging, she has her first nervous breakdown after giving birth to her first son. She sometimes told Art about the Holocaust while he was growing up, although his father did not want him to know about it. She killed herself by slitting her wrists in a bathtub in May 1968 and left no suicide note.
Richieu Spiegelman
Richieu Spiegelman (1937–1943) is Vladek and Anja's first-born son. During the war, Vladek and Anja sent him to Zawiercie to live with an aunt, somewhere they believed he would be safer than he was with them. He did not survive.
Françoise Mouly
Françoise (born 1955) is married to Art. She is French and converted to Judaism to please Art's father. Spiegelman struggles with whether he should present her as a Jewish mouse, a French frog, or some other animal—in the end, he uses a mouse.

== Background ==
Art Spiegelman was born on February 15, 1948, in Sweden to Polish Jews and Holocaust survivors Vladek and Anja Spiegelman. An aunt poisoned his parents' first son Richieu to avoid capture by the Nazis, four years before Spiegelman's birth. He and his parents emigrated to the United States in 1951. During his youth his mother occasionally talked about Auschwitz, but his father did not want him to know about it.

Spiegelman developed an interest in comics early and began drawing professionally at 16. He spent a month in Binghamton State Mental Hospital in 1968 after a nervous breakdown. Shortly after he got out, his mother died by suicide. Spiegelman's father was not happy with his son's involvement in the hippie subculture. Spiegelman said that when he bought himself a German Volkswagen it damaged their already-strained relationship "beyond repair". Around this time, Spiegelman read in fanzines about such graphic artists as Frans Masereel who had made wordless novels. The discussions in those fanzines about making the Great American Novel in comics inspired him.

From the original, more detailed 1972 "Maus" strip

Spiegelman became a key figure in the underground comix movement of the 1970s, both as cartoonist and editor. In 1972, Justin Green produced the semi-autobiographical comic book Binky Brown Meets the Holy Virgin Mary, which inspired other underground cartoonists to produce more personal and revealing work. The same year, Green asked Spiegelman to contribute a three-page strip for the first issue of Funny Aminals, which Green edited. Spiegelman wanted to do a strip about racism, and at first considered focusing on African Americans, with cats as Ku Klux Klan members chasing African-American mice. Instead, he turned to the Holocaust and depicted Nazi cats persecuting Jewish mice in a strip he titled "Maus". The tale was narrated to a mouse named "Mickey". After finishing the strip, Spiegelman visited his father to show him the finished work, which he had based in part on an anecdote he had heard about his father's Auschwitz experience. His father gave him further background information, which piqued Spiegelman's interest. Spiegelman recorded a series of interviews over four days with his father, which was to provide the basis of the longer Maus. Spiegelman followed up with extensive research, reading survivors' accounts and talking to friends and family who had also survived. He got detailed information about Sosnowiec from a series of Polish pamphlets published after the war which detailed what happened to the Jews by region.

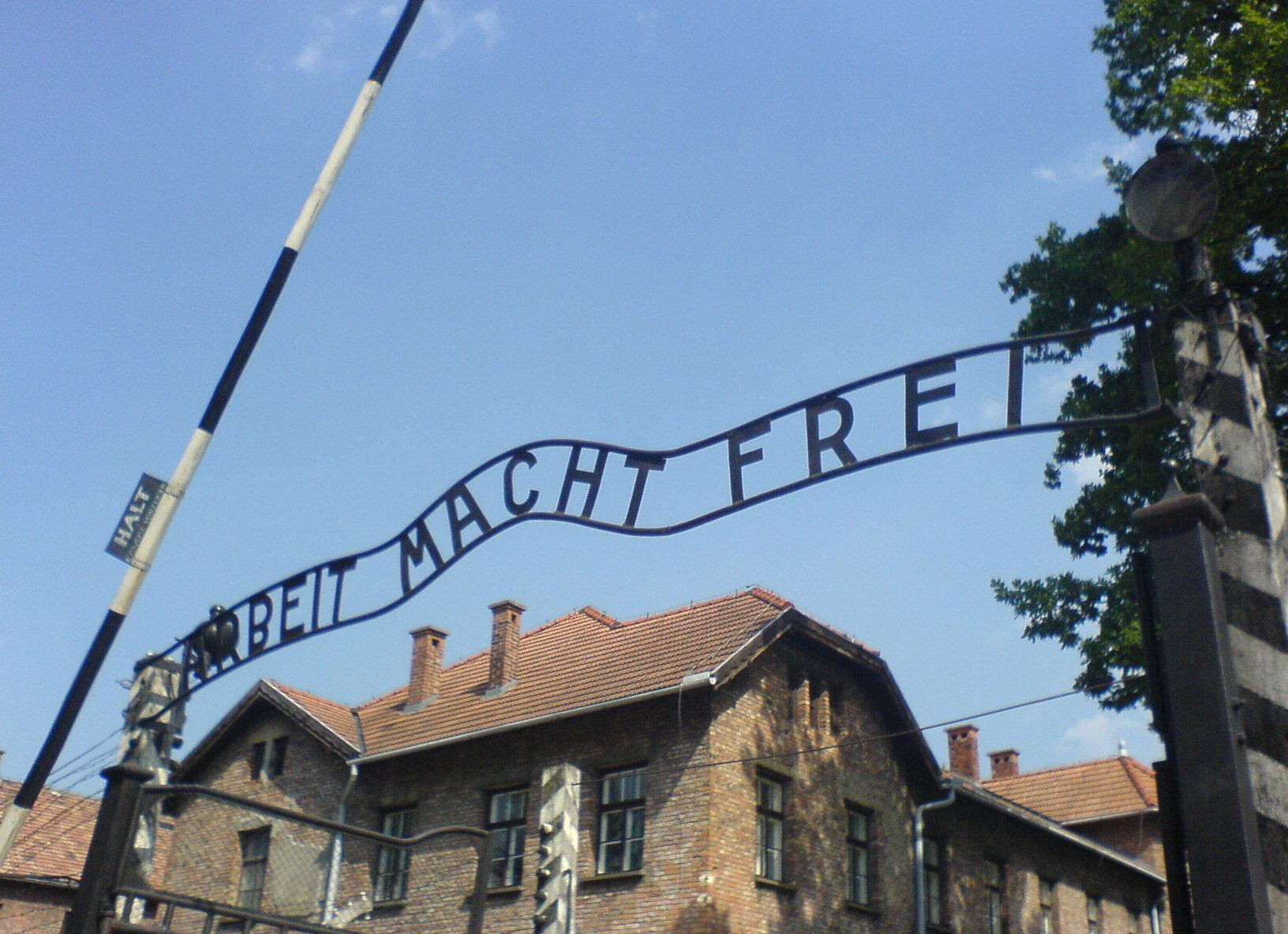
Spiegelman visited Auschwitz concentration camp in 1979 as part of his research.

In 1973, Spiegelman produced a strip for Short Order Comix #1 about his mother's suicide called "Prisoner on the Hell Planet". The same year, he edited a pornographic, psychedelic book of quotations, and dedicated it to his mother. He spent the rest of the 1970s building his reputation making short avant-garde comics. He moved back to New York from San Francisco in 1975, which he admitted to his father only in 1977, by which time he had decided to work on a "very long comic book". He began another series of interviews with his father in 1978, and visited Auschwitz in 1979. He serialized the story in a comics and graphics magazine he and his wife Mouly began in 1980 called Raw.

Spiegelman started taking down his interviews with Vladek on paper, but quickly switched to a tape recorder, face-to-face or over the phone. Spiegelman often condensed Vladek's words, and occasionally added to the dialogue or synthesized multiple retellings into a single portrayal.

Spiegelman worried about the effect that his organizing of Vladek's story would have on its authenticity. In the end, he eschewed a Joycean approach and settled on a linear narrative he thought would be better at "getting things across". He strove to present how the book was recorded and organized as an integral part of the book itself, expressing the "sense of an interview shaped by a relationship".

=== Comics medium ===
American comic books were big business with a diversity of genres in the 1940s and 1950s, but had reached a low ebb by the late 1970s. By the time Maus began serialization, the "Big Two" comics publishers, Marvel and DC Comics, dominated the industry with mostly superhero titles. The underground comix movement that had flourished in the late 1960s and early 1970s also seemed moribund. The public perception of comic books was as adolescent power fantasies, inherently incapable of mature artistic or literary expression. Most discussion focused on comics as a genre rather than as a medium.

Maus came to prominence when the term "graphic novel" was beginning to gain currency. Will Eisner popularized the term with the publication in 1978 of A Contract with God. The term was used partly to rise above the low cultural status that comics had in the English-speaking world, and partly because the term "comic book" was being used to refer to short-form periodicals, leaving no accepted vocabulary with which to talk about book-form comics.

== Publication history ==
The first chapter of Maus appeared in December 1980 in the second issue of Raw as a small insert; a new chapter appeared in each issue until the magazine came to an end in 1991. Every chapter but the last appeared in Raw.

Spiegelman struggled to find a publisher for a book edition of Maus, but after a rave New York Times review of the serial in August 1986, Pantheon Books published the first six chapters in a volume called Maus: A Survivor's Tale and subtitled My Father Bleeds History. Spiegelman was relieved that the book's publication preceded the theatrical release of the animated film An American Tail by three months, as he believed that the film, produced by Steven Spielberg's Amblin Entertainment, was inspired by Maus and wished to avoid comparisons with it.

The book found a large audience, partly because of its distribution through bookstores rather than the direct market comic shops where comic books were normally sold. Maus was difficult for critics and reviewers to classify, and also for booksellers, who needed to know on which shelves to place it. Though Pantheon pushed for the term "graphic novel", Spiegelman was not comfortable with this, as many book-length comics were being referred to as "graphic novels" whether or not they had novelistic qualities. He suspected the term's use was an attempt to validate the comics form, rather than to describe the content of the books. Spiegelman later came to accept the term, and with Drawn & Quarterly publisher Chris Oliveros successfully lobbied the Book Industry Study Group in the early 2000s to include "graphic novel" as a category in bookstores.

Pantheon collected the last five chapters in 1991 in a second volume subtitled And Here My Troubles Began. Pantheon later collected the two volumes into soft- and hardcover two-volume boxed sets and single-volume editions. These boxed sets included an original comic by Spiegelman, entitled The Past Hangs Over the Future. In 1994 the Voyager Company released The Complete Maus on CD-ROM, a collection which contained the original comics, Vladek's taped transcripts, filmed interviews, sketches, and other background material. The CD-ROM was based on HyperCard, a Macintosh and Apple IIGS application that has since become obsolete. In 2011 Pantheon Books published a companion to The Complete Maus entitled MetaMaus, with further background material, including filmed footage of Vladek. The centerpiece of the book is a Spiegelman interview conducted by Hillary Chute. It also has interviews with Spiegelman's wife and children, sketches, photographs, family trees, assorted artwork, and a DVD with video, audio, photos, and an interactive version of Maus.

Spiegelman dedicated Maus to his brother Richieu and his first daughter Nadja. The epigraph of the first volume is a quote from Adolf Hitler: "The Jews are undoubtedly a race, but they are not human". The opening of second volume emphasizes the dehumanization of the "mouse" metaphor, with a quote from a Nazi propaganda paper decrying Mickey Mouse, "the greatest bacteria carrier in the animal kingdom", as evidence of the "Jewish brutalization of the people".

=== International publication ===
Penguin Books obtained the rights to publish the initial volume in the Commonwealth in 1986. In support of the African National Congress's cultural boycott in opposition to apartheid, Spiegelman refused to "compromise with fascism" by allowing publication of his work in South Africa.

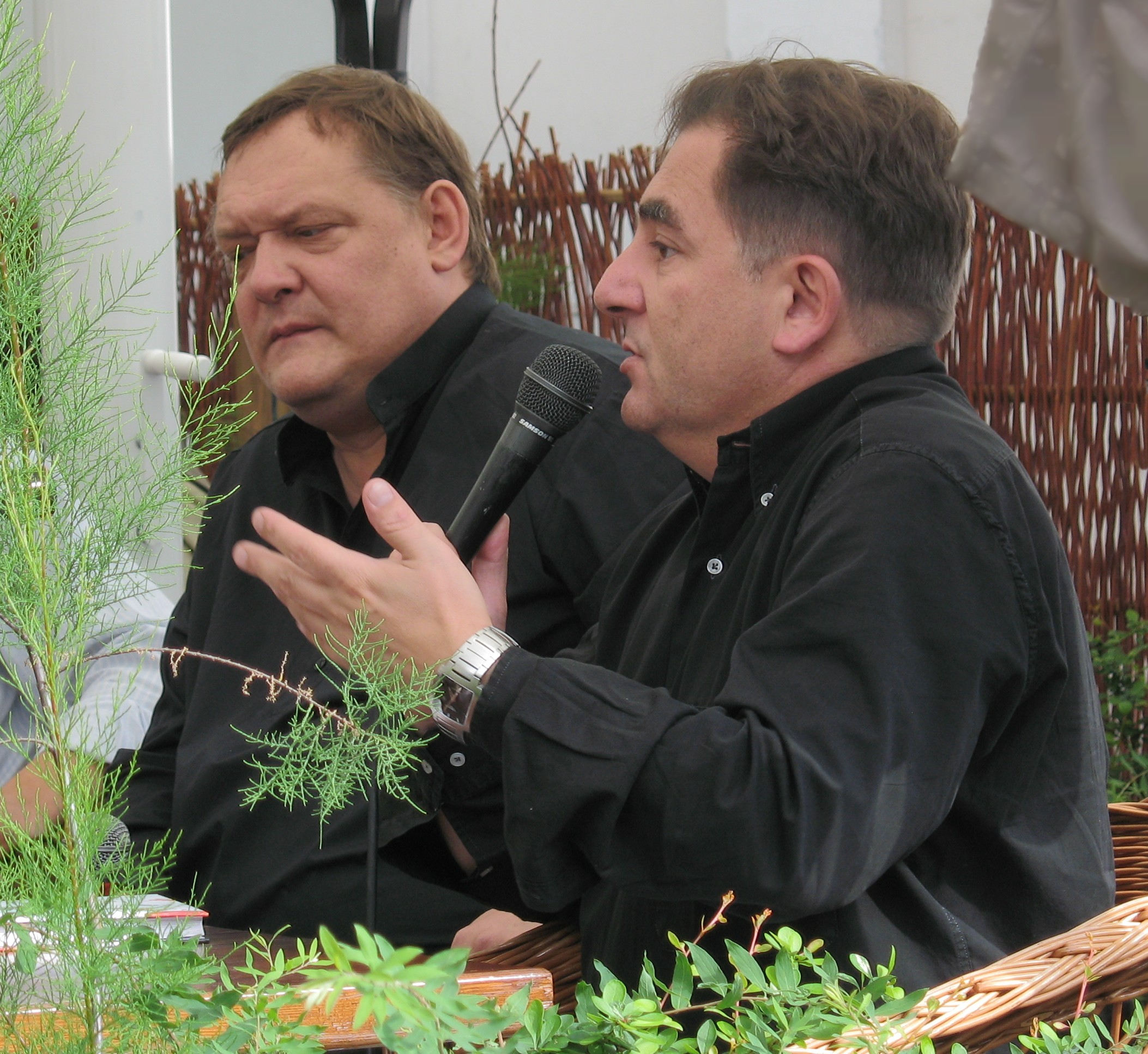
Journalist Piotr Bikont (left) set up a publishing house in 2001 to publish a Polish edition of Maus in the face of protest.

By 2011, Maus had been translated into about 30 languages. Three translations were particularly important to Spiegelman: French, as his wife was French, and because of his respect for the sophisticated Franco-Belgian comics tradition; German, given the book's background; and Polish. Poland was the setting for most of the book, and Polish was the language of his parents and his own mother tongue. The publishers of the German edition had to convince the German culture ministry of the work's serious intent to have the swastika appear on the cover, per laws prohibiting the display of Nazi symbolism. Reception in Germany was positive—Maus was a best-seller and was taught in schools. The Polish translation encountered difficulties; as early as 1987, when Spiegelman planned a research visit to Poland, the Polish consulate official who approved his visa questioned him about the Poles' depiction as pigs, and pointed out how serious an insult it was. Publishers and commentators refused to deal with the book for fear of protests and boycotts. Piotr Bikont, a journalist for Gazeta Wyborcza, set up his own publishing house to publish Maus in Polish in 2001. Demonstrators protested Maus's publication and burned the book in front of Gazeta's offices. Bikont's response was to don a pig mask and wave to the protesters from the office windows. The magazine-sized Japanese translation was the only authorized edition with larger pages. Long-standing plans for an Arabic translation have yet to come to fruition. A Russian law passed in December 2014 prohibiting the display of Nazi propaganda led to the removal of Maus from Russian bookstores leading up to Victory Day due to the swastika appearing on the book's cover. Now the book is widely available again, with a slightly modified cover.

A few panels were changed for the Hebrew edition of Maus. Based on Vladek's memory, Spiegelman portrayed one of the minor characters as a member of the Nazi-installed Jewish Police. An Israeli descendant objected and threatened to sue for libel. Spiegelman redrew the character with a fedora in place of his original police hat, but appended a note to the volume voicing his objection to this "intrusion". This version of the first volume appeared in 1990 from the publishing house Zmora Bitan. It had an indifferent or negative reception, and the publisher did not release the second volume. Another Israeli publisher put out both volumes, with a new translation by poet Yehuda Vizan that included Vladek's broken language, which Zmora Bitan had refused to do. Marilyn Reizbaum saw this as highlighting a difference between the self-image of the Israeli Jew as a fearless defender of the homeland, and that of the American Jew as a feeble victim, something that one Israeli writer disparaged as "the diaspora sickness". (Note: Translated from Hebrew by Marilyn Reizbaum.)

== Themes ==
=== Racism ===
Spiegelman parodies the Nazis' vision of racial divisions; Vladek's racism is also put on display when he becomes upset that Françoise would pick up a black hitchhiker, a "schwartser" as he says. When she berates him, a victim of antisemitism, for his attitude, he replies, "It's not even to compare, the schwartsers and the Jews!" Spiegelman gradually deconstructs the animal metaphor throughout the book, especially in the second volume, showing where the lines cannot be drawn between races of humans.

The Germans are depicted with little difference between them, but there is great variety among the Poles and Jews who dominate the story. Sometimes Jews and the Judenrat councils are shown complying with the occupiers; some trick other Jews into capture, while others act as ghetto police for the Nazis.

Spiegelman shows numerous instances of Poles who risked themselves to aid Jews, and also shows antisemitism as being rife among them. The kapos who run the camps are Poles, and Anja and Vladek are tricked by Polish smugglers into the hands of the Nazis. Anja and Vladek hear stories that Poles continue to drive off and even kill returning Jews after the war.

=== Memory ===
To Marianne Hirsch, Spiegelman's life is "dominated by memories that are not his own". His work is one not of memory but of postmemory, a term she coined after encountering Maus. This describes the relation of the children of survivors with the survivors themselves. While these children have not had their parents' experiences, they grow up with their parents' memories—the memory of another's memory—until the stories become so powerful that for these children they become memories in their own right. The children's proximity creates a "deep personal connection" with the memory, though separated from it by "generational distance". In the field of psychology, this is called transgenerational trauma or generational trauma.

Art tried to keep his father's story chronological, because otherwise he would "never keep it straight". His mother Anja's memories are conspicuously absent from the narrative, given her suicide and Vladek's destruction of her diaries. Hirsch sees Maus in part as an attempt to reconstruct her memory. Vladek keeps her memory alive with the pictures on his desk, "like a shrine", according to Mala.

=== Guilt ===
Spiegelman displays his sense of guilt in many ways. He suffers anguish over his dead brother, Richieu, who perished in the Holocaust, and whom he feels he can never live up to. The eighth chapter, made after the publication and unexpected success of the first volume, opens with a guilt-ridden Spiegelman (now in human form, with a strapped-on mouse mask) atop a pile of corpses—the corpses of the six million Jews upon whom Maus' success was built. He is told by his psychiatrist that his father feels guilt for having survived and for outliving his first son, and that some of Art's guilt may spring from painting his father in such an unflattering way. As he had not lived in the camps himself, he finds it difficult to understand or visualize this "separate universe", and feels inadequate in portraying it.

=== Language ===
Vladek spoke Yiddish and Polish. He also learned English, German, and French while still in Poland. His knowledge of languages helps him several times during the story, both before and during his imprisonment. Vladek's recounting of the Holocaust, first to American soldiers, then to his son, is in English, which became his daily language when he moved to America. Vladek's English is fluent, but his phrasing is often non-native, showing the influence of Yiddish (and possibly also of Polish). For example, he asks Art, "But, tell me, how is it by you? How is going the comics business?" Later, describing his internment, he tells Art, "[E]very day we prayed ... I was very religious, and it wasn't else to do". The passages where he is shown in Europe speaking Yiddish or Polish are in standard English, without the idiosyncratic phrasings Spiegelman records from their English-language conversations. Spiegelman does not show other Holocaust survivors (Vladek's second wife Mala, their friends, and Art's therapist Paul Pavel) using Yiddish-influenced constructions.

The German word Maus is cognate to the English word "mouse", and also reminiscent of the German verb mauscheln, which means "to speak like a Jew" and refers to the way Jews from Eastern Europe spoke German—a word etymologically related not to Maus but, distantly, to Moses.

== Style and presentation ==
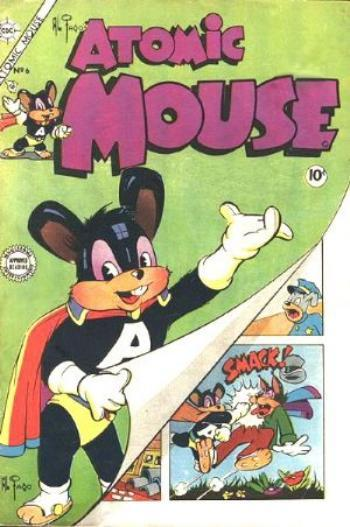
Spiegelman's use of cartoon animals, similar to those shown here, conflicted with readers' expectations.

Spiegelman's perceived audacity in using the Holocaust as his subject was compounded by his telling the story in comics. The prevailing view in the English-speaking world held comics as inherently trivial, thus degrading Spiegelman's subject matter, especially as he used animal heads in place of recognizably human ones.

Ostensibly about the Holocaust, the story entwines with the frame tale of Art interviewing and interacting with his father. Art's "Prisoner on the Hell Planet" is also encompassed by the frame, and stands in visual and thematic contrast with the rest of the book as the characters are in human form in a surreal, German Expressionist woodcut style inspired by Lynd Ward.

Spiegelman blurs the line between the frame and the world, such as when neurotically trying to deal with what Maus is becoming for him, he says to his wife: "In real life you'd never have let me talk this long without interrupting". Throughout the book, Spiegelman incorporates and highlights banal details from his father's tales, sometimes humorous or ironic, giving a lightness and humanity to the story which "helps carry the weight of the unbearable historical realities".

=== Artwork ===
The story is text-driven, with few wordless panels among its 1,500 black-and-white panels. The art has high contrast, with heavy black areas and thick black borders balanced against areas of white and wide white margins. There is little gray in the shading. In the narrative present, the pages are arranged in eight-panel grids; in the narrative past, Spiegelman found himself "violating the grid constantly" with his page layouts.

Spiegelman rendered the original three-page "Maus" and "Prisoner on the Hell Planet" in highly detailed, expressive styles. Spiegelman planned to draw Maus in such a manner, but after initial sketches he decided to use a pared-down style, one little removed from his pencil sketches, which he found more direct and immediate. Characters are rendered in a minimalist way: animal heads with dots for eyes and slashes for eyebrows and mouths, sitting on humanoid bodies. Spiegelman wanted to get away from the rendering of the characters in the original "Maus", in which oversized cats towered over the Jewish mice, an approach which Spiegelman says, "tells you how to feel, tells you how to think". He preferred to let the reader make independent moral judgments. He drew the cat-Nazis the same size as the mouse-Jews, and dropped the stereotypical villainous expressions.

Spiegelman wanted the artwork to have a diary-like feel to it, and so drew the pages on stationery with a fountain pen and typewriter correction fluid. It was reproduced at the same size it was drawn, unlike his other work, which was usually drawn larger and shrunk down, which hides defects in the art.

=== Allegory ===
Two panels of Auschwitz from Maus, depicting a seemingly Jewish inmate (a mouse) who claimed to be German (a cat). In making people of each ethnicity look alike, Spiegelman hoped to show that such racial stereotyping, with its "metaphors ... are meant to self-destruct" and "reveal the inanity of the notion itself".

Talking animals have been a staple of comics, and while they have a traditional reputation as children's fare, the underground had long made use of them in adult stories, for example in Robert Crumb's Fritz the Cat, which comics critic Joseph Witek asserts shows that the genre could "open up the way to a paradoxical narrative realism" that Maus exploited. Spiegelman, like many of his critics, has expressed concern that "[r]eality is too much for comics ... so much has to be left out or distorted", admitting that his presentation of the story may not be accurate. He takes a postmodern approach; Maus "feeds on itself", telling the story of how the story was made. It examines the choices Spiegelman made in the retelling of his father's memories, and the artistic choices he had to make. For example, when his French wife converts to Judaism, Spiegelman's character frets over whether to depict her as a frog, a mouse, or another animal.

The book therefore portrays humans with the heads and tails of different species of animals; Jews are drawn as mice and other Germans and Poles as cats and pigs, among others. Spiegelman took advantage of the way Nazi propaganda films depicted Jews as vermin, though he was first struck by the metaphor after attending a presentation where Ken Jacobs showed films of minstrel shows along with early American animated films, abundant with racial caricatures. Spiegelman derived the mouse as symbol for the Jew from Nazi propaganda, emphasized in a quote from a German newspaper in the 1930s that prefaces the second volume: "Mickey Mouse is the most miserable idea ever revealed ... Healthy emotions tell every independent young man and every honorable youth that the dirty and filth-covered vermin, the greatest bacteria carrier in the animal kingdom, cannot be the ideal type of animal ... Away with Jewish brutalization of the people! Down with Mickey Mouse! Wear the Swastika Cross!"

Jewish characters try to pass themselves off as ethnic Poles by tying pig masks to their faces, with the strings showing at the back. Vladek's disguise was more convincing than Anja's—"you could see she was more Jewish", Vladek says. Spiegelman shows this Jewishness by having her tail hang out of her disguise. This literalization of the genocidal stereotypes that drove the Nazis to their Final Solution, may risk reinforcing racist labels, but Spiegelman uses the idea to create anonymity for the characters. According to art historian Andrea Liss, this may paradoxically enable the reader to identify with the characters as human, preventing the reader from observing racial characteristics based on facial traits, while reminding readers that racist classification is ever present.

In making people of each ethnicity look alike, Spiegelman hoped to show the absurdity of dividing people along such lines. Spiegelman has stated that "these metaphors ... are meant to self-destruct" and "reveal the inanity of the notion itself". Animals signified the characters' roles in the story rather than their races—the gentile Françoise is a mouse because of her identification with her husband, who identifies with the Holocaust victims, and her conversion to Judaism. When asked what animal he would make Israeli Jews, Spiegelman suggests porcupines. When Art visits his psychiatrist, the two wear mouse masks. Spiegelman's perceptions of the animal metaphor seem to have evolved over the book's making—in the original publication of the first volume, his self-portrait showed a mouse head on a human body, but by the time the second volume arrived, his self-portrait had become that of a man wearing a mouse mask. In Maus, the characters seem to be mice and cats only in their predator/prey relationship. In every respect other than their heads and tails, they act and speak as ordinary humans. Further complicating the animal metaphor, Anja is ironically shown to be afraid of mice, while other characters appear with pet dogs and cats, and the Nazis with attack dogs. When one of the Jewish prisoners claims to be ethnically German, citing his son's medals as a Jewish WWI veteran, Spiegelman offers two variants of the same panel, one depicting him as a mouse and one as a cat.

=== Influences ===
Wordless woodcut novels such as those by Frans Masereel were an early influence on Spiegelman.

Spiegelman has published articles promoting a greater knowledge of his medium's history. Chief among his early influences were Harvey Kurtzman, Will Eisner, and Bernard Krigstein's "Master Race". Though he acknowledged Eisner's early work as an influence, he denied that Eisner's first graphic novel, A Contract with God (1978), had any impact on Maus. He cited Harold Gray's comic strip Little Orphan Annie as having "influenced Maus fairly directly", and praised Gray's work for using a cartoon-based storytelling vocabulary, rather than an illustration-based one. Justin Green's Binky Brown Meets the Holy Virgin Mary (1972) inspired Spiegelman to include autobiographical elements in his comics. Spiegelman stated, "without Binky Brown, there would be no Maus". Among the graphic artists who influenced Maus, Spiegelman cited Frans Masereel, who had made early wordless novels in woodcuts such as Passionate Journey (1919).

== Reception and legacy ==
While Spiegelman's work as cartoonist and editor had long been known and respected in the comics community, the media attention after the first volume's publication in 1986 was unexpected. Hundreds of overwhelmingly positive reviews appeared, and Maus became the center of new attention focused on comics. It was considered one of the "Big Three" book-form comics from around 1986–87, along with Watchmen and The Dark Knight Returns, that are said to have brought the term "graphic novel" and the idea of comics for adults into mainstream consciousness. It was credited with changing the public's perception of what comics could be at a time when, in the English-speaking world, they were considered to be for children, and strongly associated with superheroes. Initially, critics of Maus showed a reluctance to include comics in literary discourse. The New York Times intended praise when saying of the book, "Art Spiegelman doesn't draw comic books". After its Pulitzer Prize win, it won greater acceptance and interest among academics. The Museum of Modern Art staged an exhibition on the making of Maus in 1991–92.

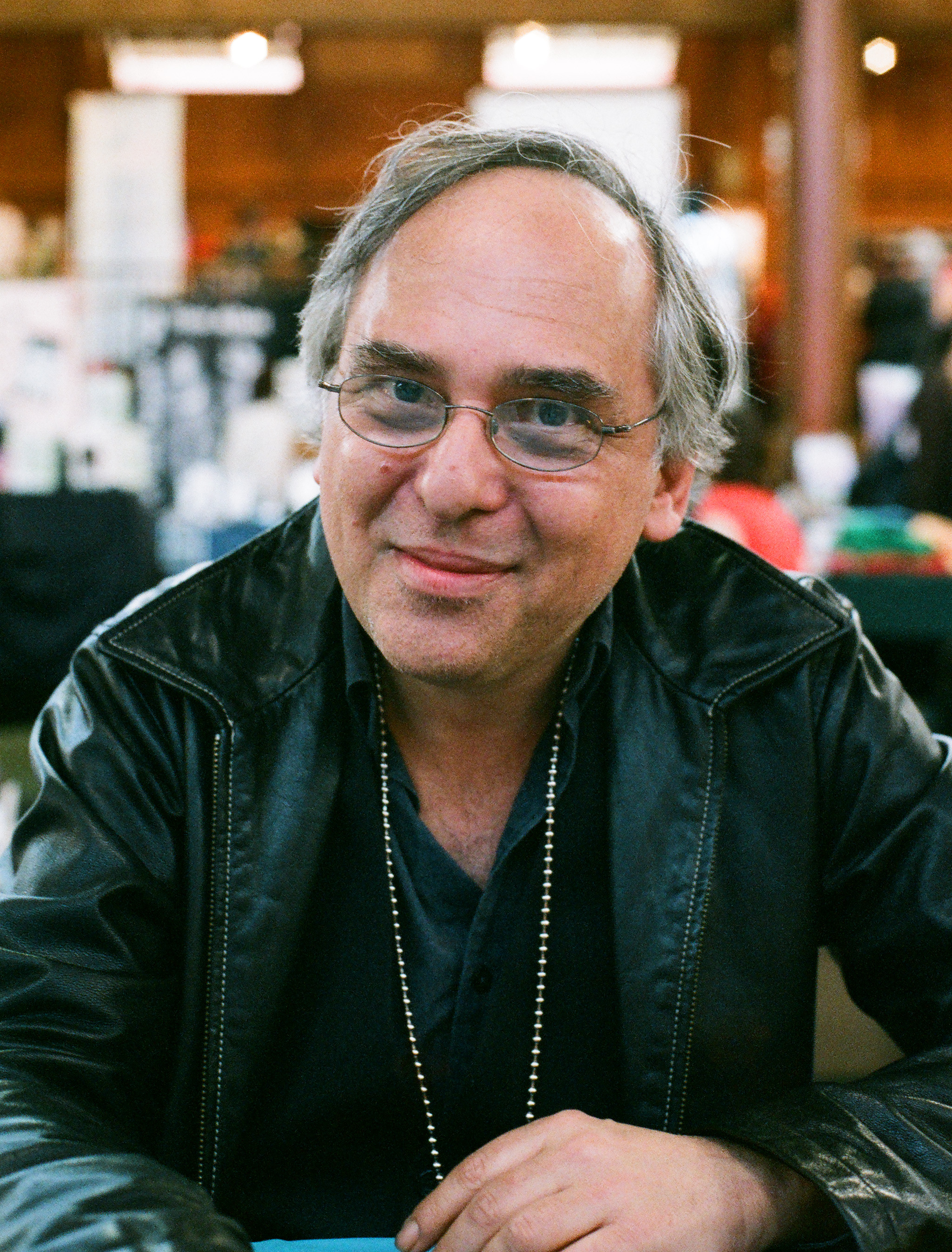
Spiegelman in 2007.

Maus proved difficult to classify to a genre, and has been called biography, fiction, autobiography, history, and memoir. Spiegelman petitioned The New York Times to move it from "fiction" to "non-fiction" on the newspaper's bestseller list, saying, "I shudder to think how David Duke ... would respond to seeing a carefully researched work based closely on my father's memories of life in Hitler's Europe and in the death camps classified as fiction". An editor responded, "Let's go out to Spiegelman's house and if a giant mouse answers the door, we'll move it to the nonfiction side of the list!" The Times eventually acquiesced. The Pulitzer committee sidestepped the issue by giving the completed Maus a Special Award in Letters in 1992.

Maus ranked highly on comics and literature lists. The Comics Journal called it the fourth greatest comics work of the 20th century, and Wizard placed it first on their list of 100 Greatest Graphic Novels. Entertainment Weekly listed Maus at seventh place on their list of "The New Classics: Books – The 100 Best Reads from 1983 to 2008", and Time put Maus at seventh place on their list of best non-fiction books from between 1923 and 2005, and fourth on their list of top graphic novels. Praise for the book also came from contemporaries such as Jules Feiffer and literary writers such as Umberto Eco. Spiegelman turned down numerous offers to have Maus adapted for film or television.

Early installments of Maus that appeared in Raw inspired the young Chris Ware to "try to do comics that had a 'serious' tone to them". Maus is cited as a primary influence on graphic novels such as Marjane Satrapi's Persepolis and Alison Bechdel's Fun Home.

In 2022, the board of trustees for McMinn County Schools in east Tennessee voted unanimously to remove Maus from the curriculum over concerns including profanity, violence, and nudity. The decision led to a backlash and attracted attention the day before Holocaust Remembrance Day, and was covered by media in the United States, Europe, Asia, and Africa. Spiegelman called the decision baffling, "Orwellian", and "daffily myopic". The ban led to Amazon sales of Maus rising to No. 1. On January 30, 2022, it was the No. 1 overall for books. On January 31, Maus held the No. 1 and No. 2 ranks on Amazon at different times during the day, and also appeared as a best seller on Barnes & Noble's top 100 list and Bookshop's index of best-selling books. Student activist group Voters of Tomorrow then announced plans in February 2022 to distribute Maus and other challenged books to students in Texas and Virginia.

=== Critique ===
A cottage industry of academic research has built up around Maus; schools have also used it as course material in a range of fields, including literature, history, dysfunctional family psychology, language arts, and social studies. The volume of academic work published on Maus far surpasses that of any other work of comics. One of the earliest such works was Joshua Brown's 1988 "Of Mice and Memory" from the Oral History Review, which deals with the problems Spiegelman faced in presenting his father's story. Marianne Hirsch wrote an influential essay on post-memory entitled "Family Pictures: Maus, Mourning, and Post-Memory", later expanded into a book called Family Frames: Photography, Narrative, and Postmemory. Academics far outside the field of comics such as Dominick LaCapra, Linda Hutcheon, and Terrence Des Pres took part in the discourse. Few approached Maus who were familiar with comics, largely because of the lack of an academic comics tradition—Maus tended to be approached as Holocaust history or from a film or literary perspective. In 2003, Deborah Geis edited a collection of essays on Maus called Considering Maus: Approaches to Art Spiegelman's "Survivor's Tale" of the Holocaust. Maus is considered an important work of Holocaust literature, and studies of it have made significant contributions to Holocaust studies.

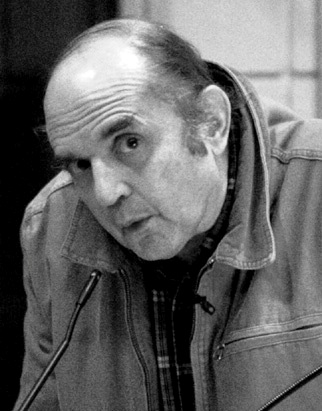
Comics writer and critic Harvey Pekar objected to Maus's use of animals, and the negative depiction of Spiegelman's father.

According to writer Arie Kaplan, some Holocaust survivors objected to Spiegelman making a comic book out of their tragedy. Literary critics such as Hillel Halkin objected that the animal metaphor was "doubly dehumanizing", reinforcing the Nazi belief that the atrocities were perpetrated by one species on another, when they were actually done by humans against humans. Comics writer and critic Harvey Pekar and others saw Spiegelman's use of animals as potentially reinforcing stereotypes. Pekar was also disdainful of Spiegelman's overwhelmingly negative portrayal of his father, calling him disingenuous and hypocritical for such a portrayal in a book that presents itself as objective. Comics critic R. C. Harvey argued that Spiegelman's animal metaphor threatened "to erode [Maus's] moral underpinnings", and played "directly into [the Nazis'] racist vision".

Commentators such as Peter Obst and Lawrence Weschler expressed concern over the Poles' depiction as pigs, which reviewer Marek Kohn saw as an ethnic slur and The Norton Anthology of American Literature called "a calculated insult". Jewish culture views pigs and pork as non-kosher, or unclean, a point of which the Jewish Spiegelman was unlikely to be ignorant. Critics such as Obst and Pekar have said that the portrayal of Poles is unbalanced—that, while some Poles are seen as helping Jews, they are often shown doing so for self-serving reasons. In the late 1990s, an objector to Maus's depiction of Poles interrupted a presentation by Spiegelman at Montreal's McGill University with persistent abuse and was removed from the auditorium.

Literary critic Walter Benn Michaels found Spiegelman's racial divisions "counterfactual". Spiegelman depicts Europeans as different animal species based on Nazi conceptions of race, but all Americans, both black and white, as dogs—with the exception of the Jews, who remain unassimilated mice. In Michaels view, Maus seems to gloss over the racial inequality that has plagued the history of the U.S.

Scholar Bart Beaty disagrees with claims from other critics that Maus presents a fatalistic perspective. Rather, he argues that Maus problematizes the essentialistic understanding of the relationship between the German "cats" and Jewish "mice", or the notion that there is something natural about Germans killing Jewish people.

Scholar Paul Buhle asserted: "More than a few readers have described [Maus] as the most compelling of any [Holocaust] depiction, perhaps because only the caricatured quality of comic art is equal to the seeming unreality of an experience beyond all reason". Michael Rothberg opined: "By situating a nonfictional story in a highly mediated, unreal, 'comic' space, Spiegelman captures the hyperintensity of Auschwitz".

=== Parodies ===
Belgian publisher La Cinquième Couche produced a book entitled Katz, a remix of Spiegelman's book but with all animal heads replaced with cat heads. The book reproduced every page and line of dialogue from the French translation of Maus. The French publisher of the book, Flammarion, had the Belgian publisher destroy all copies under charges of copyright violation.

Jesse Reklaw wrote and drew a short version of Michael and Douglas Crichton's novel Dealing: or the Berkeley-to-Boston Forty-Brick Lost-Bag Blues in the style of Maus for the minicomic Low-Jinx #3.

== Awards and nominations ==
Awards and nominations for Maus
Year	Organization	Award	Result
1986	National Book Critics Circle	National Book Critics Circle Award for Biography	Nominated
1987	Present Tense magazine American Jewish Committee	Present Tense/Joel H. Cavior Book Award for Fiction	Won
1988	Témoignage chrétien (Christian Testimony)	Prix Résistance by Témoignage chrétien	Won
1988	Angoulême International Comics Festival Awards	Best Foreign Album (Maus: un survivant raconte - Mon père saigne l'histoire)	Won
1988	Urhunden Prize	Foreign Album	Won
1990	Max & Moritz Prize	Special Prize	Won
1991	National Book Critics Circle	National Book Critics Circle Award	Nominated
1992	Pulitzer Prize	Special Awards and Citations – Letters	Won
1992	Eisner Award	Best Graphic Album—Reprint (Maus II).	Won
1992	Harvey Award	Best Graphic Album of Previously Published Material (Maus II)	Won
1992	Los Angeles Times	Book Prize for Fiction (Maus II)	Won
1993	Angoulême International Comics Festival Awards	Best Foreign Album (Maus: un survivant raconte - Et c'est là que mes ennuis ont commencé)	Won
1993	Urhunden Prize	Foreign Album (Maus II)	Won

Awards and nominations for MetaMaus
Year	Organization	Award	Result
2011	Jewish Book Council	National Jewish Book Award for Biography	Won

== See also ==
- Anthropomorphism – Attribution of human traits to non-human entities
- Birds' Head Haggadah – Illuminated Passover liturgical manuscript
- Ethnic stereotypes in comics
- Holocaust education – Efforts to educate populace on the Holocaust
- Mickey au Camp de Gurs – 1942 French comic book by Horst Rosenthal
- Stereotypes of Jews in literature

== Works cited ==
=== Books ===
- Abell, Catharine (2012). "Comics and Genre". In Meskin, Aaron; Cook, Roy T (eds.). The Art of Comics: A Philosophical Approach. John Wiley & Sons. ISBN 978-1-4443-3464-7.
- Adams, Jeff (2008). Documentary Graphic Novels and Social Realism. Peter Lang. ISBN 978-3-03911-362-0.
- Ahrens, Jörn; Meteling, Arno (2010). Comics and the City: Urban Space in Print, Picture, and Sequence. Continuum International Publishing Group. ISBN 978-0-8264-4019-8.
- Baker, Steve (1993). Picturing the Beast: Animals, Identity, and Representation. Manchester University Press. ISBN 978-0-7190-3378-0. (attributed to Kohn, Marek (September 10, 1987). "Paws and Whiskers". The Listener: 25.)
- Ball, David M.; Kuhlman, Martha B. (2010). The Comics of Chris Ware: Drawing Is a Way of Thinking. University Press of Mississippi. ISBN 978-1-60473-442-3.
- Berger, James (1999). After the End: Representations of Post-Apocalypse. University of Minnesota Press. ISBN 978-0-8166-2932-9.
- Chute, Hillary L (2010). Graphic Women: Life Narrative and Contemporary Comics. Columbia University Press. ISBN 978-0-231-15062-0.
- Duncan, Randy; Smith, Matthew J (2009). The Power of Comics. Continuum International Publishing Group. ISBN 978-0-8264-2936-0.
- Fagan, Bryan D.; Fagan, Jody Condit (2011). "Medium or Genre?". Comic Book Collections for Libraries. ABC-CLIO. p. 3. ISBN 978-1-59884-511-2.
- Fathers, Michael (2007). "Art Mimics Life in the Death Camps". In Witek, Joseph (ed.). Art Spiegelman: Conversations. University Press of Mississippi. pp. 122–125. ISBN 978-1-934110-12-6. (Originally in Independent on Sunday on 1992-03-22)
- Fischer, Heinz Dietrich; Fischer, Erika J. (2002). "Spiegelman, Art". Complete Biographical Encyclopedia of Pulitzer Prize Winners, 1917–2000: Journalists, Writers and Composers on Their Ways to the Coveted Awards. Walter de Gruyter. p. 230. ISBN 978-3-598-30186-5.
- Harvey, R. C. (1996). The Art of the Comic Book: An Aesthetic History. University Press of Mississippi. ISBN 978-0-87805-758-0.
- Hatfield, Charles (2005). Alternative Comics: An Emerging Literature. University Press of Mississippi. ISBN 978-1-57806-719-0.
- Hignite, Todd (2007). "Art Spiegelman". In the Studio: Visits With Contemporary Cartoonists. Yale University Press. pp. 40–61. ISBN 978-0-300-13387-5.
- Hirsch, Marianne (1997). Family Frames: Photography, Narrative, and Postmemory. Harvard University Press. ISBN 978-0-674-29265-9.
- Horowitz, Sara R. (1997). "Art Spiegelman". In Shatzky, Joel; Taub, Michael (eds.). Contemporary Jewish-American Novelists: A Bio-Critical Sourcebook. Greenwood Publishing Group. pp. 400–408. ISBN 978-0-313-29462-4.
- Hungerford, Amy (2003). "Surviving Rego Park". The Holocaust of Texts: Genocide, Literature, and Personification. University of Chicago Press. pp. 73–96. ISBN 978-0-226-36076-8.
- Kannenberg, Gene Jr. (2001). "'I Looked Just Like Rudolph Valentino': Identity and Representation in Maus". In Baetens, Jan (ed.). The Graphic Novel. Leuven University Press. pp. 79–89. ISBN 978-90-5867-109-7.
- Kaplan, Arie (2006). Masters of the Comic Book Universe Revealed!. Chicago Review Press. ISBN 978-1-55652-633-6.
- Kaplan, Arie (2008). From Krakow to Krypton: Jews and Comic Books. Jewish Publication Society. ISBN 978-0-8276-0843-6.
- Baym, Nina; Klinkowitz, Jerome; Krupat, Arnold; Wallace, Patricia B., eds. (2007). The Norton Anthology of American Literature. Vol. E. W. W. Norton. ISBN 978-0393927436.
- LaCapra, Dominick (1998). "'Twas the Night Before Christmas: Art Spiegelman's Maus". History and Memory After Auschwitz. Cornell University Press. pp. 139–179. ISBN 978-0-8014-8496-4.
- Levine, Michael G. (2006). The Belated Witness: Literature, Testimony, and the Question of Holocaust Survival. Stanford University Press. ISBN 978-0-8047-5555-9.
- Liss, Andrea (1998). Trespassing Through Shadows: Memory, Photography, and the Holocaust. University of Minnesota Press. ISBN 978-0-8166-3060-8.
- Loman, Andrew (2010). "The Canonization of Maus". In Williams, Paul; Lyons, James (eds.). The Rise of the American Comics Artist: Creators and Contexts. University Press of Mississippi. ISBN 978-1-60473-792-9.
- Mandel, Naomi (2006). "The Story of my Death: Night, Maus, Shoah and the Image of the Speaking Corpse". Against the Unspeakable: Complicity, the Holocaust, and Slavery in America. University of Virginia Press. pp. 99–130. ISBN 978-0-8139-2581-3.
- McGlothlin, Erin Heather (2006). "'In Auschwitz We Didn't Wear Watches': Marking Time in Art Spiegelman's Maus". Second-Generation Holocaust Literature: Legacies of Survival and Perpetration. Camden House Publishing. pp. 66–90. ISBN 978-1-57113-352-6.
- Meskin, Aaron; Cook, Roy T., eds. (2012). The Art of Comics: A Philosophical Approach. John Wiley & Sons. ISBN 978-1-4443-3464-7.
- Monnin, Katie (2010). Teaching Graphic Novels: Practical Strategies for the Secondary ELA Classroom. Maupin House Publishing, Inc. ISBN 978-1-934338-40-7.
- Moss, Joshua Louis (2017). Why Harry Met Sally: Subversive Jewishness, Anglo-Christian Power, and the Rhetoric of Modern Love. University of Texas Press. ISBN 978-1-4773-1283-4.
- Orbán, Katalin (2005). "Mauschwitz". Ethical Diversions: The Post-Holocaust Narratives of Pynchon, Abish, DeLillo, and Spiegelman. Routledge. pp. 35–74. ISBN 978-0-415-97167-6.
- Petersen, Robert (2010). Comics, Manga, and Graphic Novels: A History of Graphic Narratives. ABC-CLIO. ISBN 978-0-313-36330-6.
- Pustz, Matthew J (2007). "I Gave It All Up to Draw Comics: Autobiographical (And Other) Tales About Creating Comic Books". In Klaehn, Jeffery (ed.). Inside the World of Comic Books. Black Rose Books. pp. 61–81. ISBN 978-1-55164-296-3.
- Reibmann, James E. (2001). "Fredric Wertham, Spiegelman's Maus, and Representations of the Holocaust". In Baetens, Jan (ed.). The Graphic Novel. Leuven University Press. pp. 23–30. ISBN 978-90-5867-109-7.
- Reizbaum, Marilyn (2000). Silberstein, Laurence Jay (ed.). Mapping Jewish Identities. New York University Press. ISBN 978-0-8147-9769-3.
- Rhoades, Shirrel (2008). Comic Books: How the Industry Works. Peter Lang. ISBN 978-0-8204-8892-9.
- Rice, Maria J. (2007). Migrations of Memory: Postmemory in Twentieth Century Ethnic American Women's Literature. ISBN 978-0-549-69539-4.
- Rosen, Alan Charles (2005). Sounds of Defiance: the Holocaust, Multilingualism, and the Problem of English. University of Nebraska Press. ISBN 978-0-8032-3962-3.
- Rothberg, Michael (2000). Traumatic Realism: The Demands of Holocaust Representation. University of Minnesota Press. ISBN 978-0-8166-3459-0.
- Russell, Vanessa (2008). "The Mild-Mannered Reporter: How Clark Kent Surpassed Superman". In Ndalianis, Angela (ed.). The Contemporary Comic Book Superhero. Taylor & Francis. pp. 216–232. ISBN 978-0-415-99176-6.
- Sabin, Roger (1993). Adult Comics: An Introduction. Taylor & Francis. ISBN 978-0-415-04419-6.
- Schuldiner, Michael (2011). "The Second-Generation Holocaust Nonsurvivor: Third-Degree Metalepsis and Creative Block in Art Spiegelman's Maus". In Royal, Derek Parker (ed.). Unfinalized Moments: Essays in the Development of Contemporary Jewish American Narrative. Purdue University Press. pp. 69–80. ISBN 978-1-55753-584-9.
- Schwab, Gabriele (2010). Haunting Legacies: Violent Histories and Transgenerational Trauma. Columbia University Press. ISBN 978-0-231-52635-7.
- Smith, Graham (2007). "From Mickey to Maus: Recalling the Genocide Through Cartoon". In Witek, Joseph (ed.). Art Spiegelman: Conversations. University Press of Mississippi. pp. 84–94. ISBN 978-1-934110-12-6. (Originally in Oral History Journal Vol. 15, Spring 1987)
- Spiegelman, Art (2011). Chute, Hillary (ed.). MetaMAUS. Viking Press. ISBN 978-0-670-91683-2.
- Stringer, Jenny, ed. (1996). "Graphic novel". The Oxford Companion to Twentieth-Century Literature in English. Oxford University Press. p. 262. ISBN 978-0-19-212271-1.
- Tan, Ed (2001). "The Telling Face in Comic Strip and Graphic Novel". In Baetens, Jan (ed.). The Graphic Novel. Leuven University Press. pp. 31–46. ISBN 978-90-5867-109-7.
- Weine, Stevan J. (2006). Testimony After Catastrophe: Narrating the Traumas of Political Violence. Northwestern University Press. ISBN 978-0-8101-2300-7.
- Weiner, Stephen (2003). Faster than a Speeding Bullet: The Rise of the Graphic Novel. NBM Publishing. ISBN 978-1-56163-368-5.
- Williams, Paul; Lyons, James (2010). The Rise of the American Comics Artist: Creators and Contexts. University Press of Mississippi. ISBN 978-1-60473-792-9.
- Wirth-Nesher, Hana (2006). Call It English: The Languages of Jewish American Literature. Princeton University Press. ISBN 978-0-691-13844-2.
- Witek, Joseph (1989). Comic Books as History: The Narrative Art of Jack Jackson, Art Spiegelman, and Harvey Pekar. University Press of Mississippi. ISBN 978-0-87805-406-0.
- Wolk, Douglas (2008). Reading Comics: How Graphic Novels Work and What They Mean. Da Capo Press. ISBN 978-0-7867-2157-3.
- Wood, Monica (1997). "Maus: A Survivor's Tale, Volumes I and II, by Art Spiegelman". 12 Multicultural Novels: Reading and Teacher Strategies. Walch Publishing. pp. 81–94. ISBN 978-0-8251-2901-8.
- Young, James E. (2006). "The Arts of Jewish Memory in a Postmodern Age". In Rüsen, Jörn (ed.). Meaning and Representation in History. Berghahn Books. pp. 239–254. ISBN 978-1-57181-776-1.

=== Journals and magazines ===
- Arnold, Andrew D. (September 7, 2001). "Lemons into Lemonade". Time. Archived from the original on November 18, 2016.
- Bolhafner, J. Stephen (October 1991). "Art for Art's Sake". The Comics Journal. 348 (145). Fantagraphics Books: 96–99. Bibcode:1990Natur.348..280C. doi:10.1038/348280d0. ISSN 0194-7869.
- Brown, Joshua (1988). "Of Mice and Memory". Oral History Review (Spring). Oral History Association: 91–109. doi:10.1093/ohr/16.1.91. ISSN 0094-0798.
- Chute, Hillary (Summer 2006). ""The Shadow of a past Time": History and Graphic Representation in "Maus"". Twentieth Century Literature. 52 (2): 199–230. doi:10.1215/0041462X-2006-3001. JSTOR 20479765. S2CID 160818029.
- Frahm, Ole (May 2004). "Considering MAUS. Approaches to Art Spiegelman's "Survivor's Tale" of the Holocaust by Deborah R. Geis (ed.)". Image & Narrative (8). ISSN 1780-678X. Archived from the original on January 4, 2019.
- Gordon, Andrew (Spring 2004). "Jewish Fathers and Sons in Spiegelman's Maus and Roth's Patrimony". ImageTexT. 1 (1). ISSN 1549-6732.
- Jannequin, Jean-Paul (April 1990). "Druillet and Spiegelman Take Grand Prizes". The Comics Journal (121). Fantagraphics Books: 19. ISSN 0194-7869.
- Kannenberg, Gene Jr. (February 1999). Groth, Gary (ed.). "#4: Maus". The Comics Journal (210). Fantagraphics Books. ISSN 0194-7869.
- McGlothlin, Erin Heather (May 2003). "No Time Like the Present: Narrative and Time in Art Spiegelman's Maus". Narrative. 11 (2): 177–198. doi:10.1353/nar.2003.0007. S2CID 146408018.
- Merino, Ana (2010). "Memory in Comics: Testimonial, Autobiographical and Historical Space in Maus". TransAtlantica. 2010 (1). ISSN 1765-2766.
- Park, Hye Su (January 1, 2011). "Art Spiegelman's Maus: A Survivor's Tale: A Bibliographic Essay". Shofar. 29 (2): 146–164. doi:10.1353/sho.2011.0038. S2CID 54749234.
- Pekar, Harvey (December 1986). "Maus and Other Topics". The Comics Journal (113). Fantagraphics Books: 54–57. ISSN 0194-7869.
- Pekar, Harvey (April 1990). "Blood and Thunder". The Comics Journal. 302 (135). Fantagraphics Books: 27–34. Bibcode:1983Natur.302..784D. doi:10.1038/302784a0. ISSN 0194-7869.
- Surridge, Matthew (July 2001). "When Extravagant Fantasies Become Drab Experiences". The Comics Journal (235). Fantagraphics Books: 36–37. ISSN 0194-7869.
- Weschler, Lawrence (July–August 2001). "Pig Perplex". Lingua Franca. 11 (5).
- Witek, Joseph (2004). "Imagetext, or, Why Art Spiegelman Doesn't Draw Comics". ImageTexT: Interdisciplinary Comics Studies. 1 (1). University of Florida. ISSN 1549-6732. Archived from the original on November 29, 2014.
- Wizard staff (June 2009). "100 Greatest Graphic Novels of our Lifetime". Wizard (212). Wizard Entertainment.* Banita, Georgiana; Konstantinou, Lee, eds. (2023). Artful Breakdowns: The Comics of Art Spiegelman. University of Mississippi Press. ISBN 978-1-4968-3750-9.
- Ewert, Jeanne (2004). "Art Spiegelman's Maus and the Graphic Narrative". In Ryan, Marie-Laure (ed.). Narrative Across Media: The Languages of Storytelling. University of Nebraska Press. pp. 180–193. ISBN 978-0-8032-8993-2.
- Geis, Deborah R., ed. (2007). Considering Maus: Approaches to Art Spiegelman's "Survivor's tale" of the Holocaust. University of Alabama Press. ISBN 978-0-8173-5435-0.
- Kannenberg, Eugene P. (2002). Form, Function, Fiction: Text and Image in the Comics Narratives of Winsor McCay, Art Spiegelman, and Chris Ware. University of Connecticut. ISBN 978-0-493-69522-8. ProQuest 304791620.
- Miller, Frieda (1998). Maus: A Memoir of the Holocaust: Teacher's Guide (PDF). Vancouver Holocaust Education Centre. ISBN 978-1-895754-29-2.

=== Newspapers ===
- Couvreur, Daniel (March 5, 2012). "Katz a-t-il défiguré Maus ?". Le Soir (in French). Archived from the original on November 2, 2013.
- Garner, Dwight (October 12, 2011). "After a Quarter-Century, an Author Looks Back at His Holocaust Comic". The New York Times.
- Franklin, Ruth (October 5, 2011). "Art Spiegelman's Genre-Defying Holocaust Work, Revisited". The New Republic.
- Hays, Matthew (October 8, 2011). "Of Maus and man: Art Spiegelman revisits his Holocaust classic". The Globe and Mail.
- Kois, Dan (December 2, 2011). "The Making of 'Maus'". The New York Times.
- Langer, Lawrence L (December 6, 1998). "A Fable Of The Holocaust". The New York Times.
- McGrath, Charles (July 11, 2004). "Not Funnies". The New York Times.
- New York Times staff (March 11, 1987). "Awards for Books With Jewish Themes". The New York Times.

=== Websites ===
- Beaty, Bart (March 7, 2012). "Conversational Euro-Comics: Bart Beaty On Katz". The Comics Reporter.
- Blau, Rosie (November 29, 2008). "Breakfast with the FT: Art Spiegelman". Financial Times.(registration required)
- Colbert, James (November 8, 1992). "Times Book Prizes 1992 : Fiction : On Maus II". Los Angeles Times.
- Comic Salon staff (2012). "Nominierungen/Preisträger seit 1984" (in German). Comic Salon.
- Conan, Neal (October 5, 2011). "'MetaMaus': The Story Behind Spiegelman's Classic". NPR.
- The Daily Free Press staff (September 28, 2000). "Cartoonist Sued for $1.5 Million". The Daily Free Press. Archived from the original on February 26, 2014.
- Eisner Awards staff (2012). "Complete List of Eisner Award Winners". San Diego Comic-Con International. Archived from the original on April 27, 2011.
- Entertainment Weekly staff (June 27, 2008). "The New Classics: Books". Entertainment Weekly. Archived from the original on January 27, 2012.
- Gambino, Lauren (April 28, 2015). "Art Spiegelman warns of 'dangerous' outcome as Russian shops ban Maus". The Guardian. Archived from the original on June 2, 2015.
- Grossman, Lev (March 6, 2009). "Top Ten Graphic Novels: Maus". Time.
- Hammarlund, Ola (August 8, 2007). "Urhunden: Satir och iransk kvinnoskildring får seriepris" (in Swedish). Urhunden. Archived from the original on April 13, 2019.
- Harvey Awards staff (1992). "1992 Harvey Award Winners". Harvey Awards. Archived from the original on March 15, 2016.
- Johnston, Ian (December 28, 2001). "On Spiegelman's Maus I and II". Vancouver Island University. Archived from the original on January 22, 2012.
- Morman, Todd (January 29, 2003). "High Art, Hit Movies and Manifestos". IndyWeek.com. Archived from the original on May 16, 2013.
- Mozzocco, J. Caleb (December 1, 2011). "Balloonless | Art Spiegelman and Hillary Chute's MetaMaus". Comic Book Resources. Archived from the original on December 4, 2011.
- National Book Critics Circle staff (2012). "All Past National Book Critics Circle Award Winners and Finalists". National Book Critics Circle. Archived from the original on April 8, 2014.
- Obst, Peter. "A Commentary on Maus by Art Spiegelman". American Council for Polish Culture. Archived from the original on March 4, 2016.
- Pulitzer Prize staff (2012). "Special Awards and Citations". Pulitzer Prizes.
- Silver, Alexandra (August 30, 2011). "All-TIME 100 Nonfiction Books: Maus". Time.
- Smith, Russ (July 30, 1999). "When Controversy Ralls the Comics World". Jewish World Review.
- Tout en BD staff (1993). "Le festival BD: Le palmarès 1993" (in French). Tout en BD. Archived from the original on October 5, 2011.
- Tout en BD staff (1998). "Le festival BD: Le palmarès 1988" (in French). Tout en BD. Archived from the original on February 7, 2012.
- Tzadka, Saul (February 2, 2012). "Maus: Revisited". Alondon.
- Steinhauer, Jillian (May 3, 2023). "Past and Present: How Maus changed the way we think about comics". Books & the Arts. The Nation.
