= Monoskop =

Wiki for arts and studies

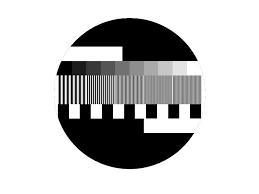

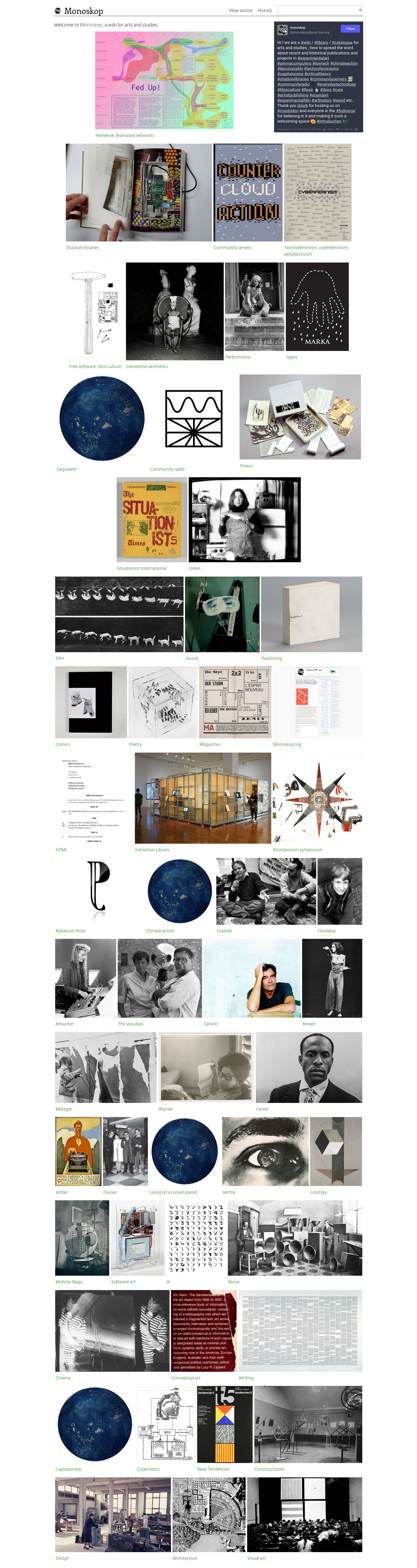
- Website type: Wiki
- Founded: 2004
- Founder: Dušan Barok
- Website: monoskop.org
- Written in: PHP (MediaWiki)

Monoskop is a self-described "wiki for arts and studies" founded by artist and activist Dušan Barok in 2004.
