= La Cinquième Couche =

Belgian independent comics publisher

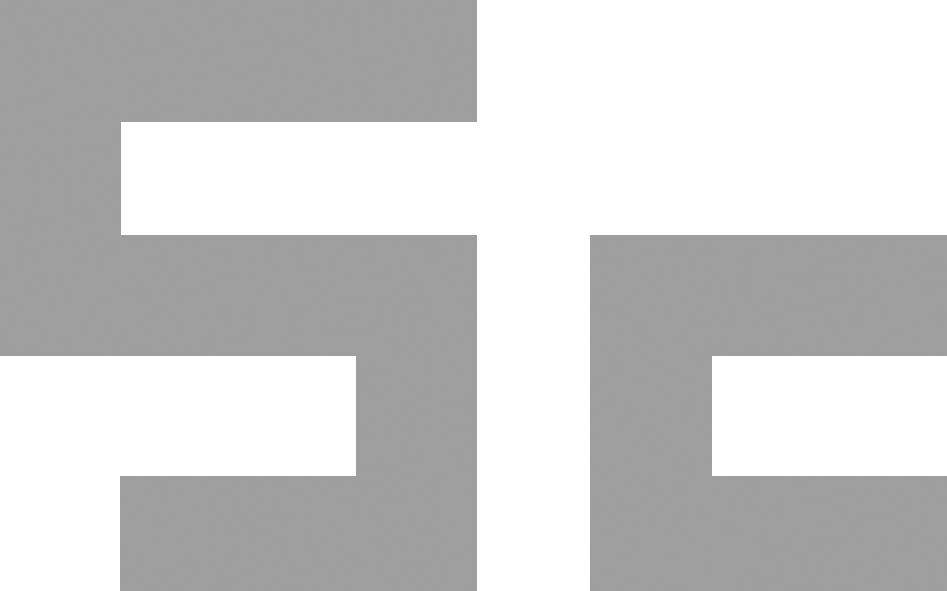
- Status: Active
- Founded: 1993
- Founder: Xavier Löwenthal and others
- Country of origin: Belgium
- Headquarters location: Brussels
- Key people: William Henne, Xavier Löwenthal
- Publication types: Comics
- Nonfiction topics: Alternative comics, conceptual comics
- Imprints: F., Extracteur, Écritures, Essaim, Point métal
- Official website: 5c.be

La Cinquième Couche (French: [la sɛ̃kjɛm kuʃ]; lit. "the fifth layer"), also known as 5c, is a Belgian independent comics publisher based in Brussels. Founded in 1993 by students from the comics workshop of the Institut Saint-Luc, it operates since 1999 as a formal publishing house. It is currently directed by William Henne and Xavier Löwenthal. Its catalogue of over 110 titles, by some sixty authors from more than ten countries, is marked by a consistent tendency toward conceptual and experimental comics — works the press itself calls Conceptual Comics (la bande dessinée spéculative).

== History ==
La Cinquième Couche was founded in 1993 by a group of students from the comics workshop of the Institut Saint-Luc in Brussels, among them Damien Rocour, Sarah Masson, Michel Squarci, Sibylle Loof, Olivier Fable, Vincent Dutreuil, Nicholas Wood, Sébastien Kempenaers, Christophe Poot, Renaud De Heyn, and Xavier Löwenthal. The group initially published a fanzine under the same name; for its first years it remained an informal collective that self-published its members' work. Around the turn of the millennium, it restructured as a proper publishing house.

The name is a wry allusion to the art historian Clement Greenberg's four-stage model of modernism — La Cinquième Couche positions itself as a hypothetical fifth layer beyond that canon.

William Henne, who had published independently since 1994, joined the collective in 1998. By the 2010s, he and Löwenthal had become its co-directors. As of 2016, the catalogue counted over 110 publications (five issued between 1993 and 1998, the remainder from 1999 onward), with authors from Belgium, France, Switzerland, Germany, Austria, Portugal, Greece, Finland, the United States, and South Korea.

Between 2004 and 2007, 5c incorporated the contemporary literature journal Écritures into its catalogue. From 2010 to 2013, it also published the journal Soldes, Fins de Séries by Marc Borgers and Jean-Louis Sbille.

== Editorial philosophy ==
La Cinquième Couche has never formally defined a programme. Its own editorial statement reads: "Comics is a contemporary art form like any other. 5c holds it in high regard, as do its readers. Everything that brushes against comics interests La Cinquième Couche — and tends to pull it away. Its field of action is, by definition, porous and unlimited."

Despite this deliberate openness, critics and the press's own documentation identify a consistent editorial tendency: an attraction to what 5c calls la bande dessinée spéculative (speculative or conceptual comics). Its catalogue favours works that proceed from a conceptual device — ludic, theoretical, poetic, or self-referential — applied to the comics form. Recurrent strategies include appropriation and détournement, mise en abyme, systematic or inverted narrative structures, formal constraint, deconstruction of the image, dissociated text–image relationships, abstraction, musical structure, and literary imposture.

In the words of Löwenthal: "We always acted as if comics were a contemporary art with which one could try anything, say anything, do anything."

The press emphasises that such formal devices do not obscure an author's subject matter but rather reinvigorate it: tackling a well-worn theme through a renewed or unusual form brings that theme — whether political, autobiographical, philosophical, or social — back into focus.

Authors published by 5c frequently work across other disciplines: theatre, performance and installation art, music, painting, sculpture, graphic design, screen printing, animation, video, photography, and literature.

== Collections ==
The catalogue is organised into five collections:

- F. — the main fiction and narrative series
- Extracteur — longer, formally experimental works
- Écritures — contemporary literature (initially an independent journal, 2004–2007)
- Essaim — conceptual and appropriation works
- Point métal — short-format publications

== Selected conceptual and experimental publications ==
=== Judith Forest (2009, 2011) — literary hoax ===
In 2009, 5c published 1h25, presented as the intimate autobiographical comics diary of a young French woman named Judith Forest. The book received critical praise from outlets including Arte and Les Inrockuptibles. In early 2010, it emerged that Judith Forest was a fictional author, invented by the press's own editorial team: William Henne, Xavier Löwenthal, and Thomas Boivin.

The hoax was designed not to boost sales but to provoke debate about authenticity, the value of the autobiographical genre in comics, and the role of genre conventions in shaping reader expectations. A second volume, Momon, followed in 2011, and the affair was later documented in Sexe, mensonges et édition (2021).

=== Katz (2012) — appropriation and legal controversy ===
Katz, by Ilan Manouach, is a reworking of Art Spiegelman's Maus in which every character — not only the Nazis — has been given a cat's head, dissolving the species-based allegory of the original. It was printed in November 2011 and first presented at the Angoulême International Comics Festival in January 2012, when Spiegelman himself was presiding over the festival's jury — a timing that was deliberate. Around one hundred copies circulated on the stands of various independent Franco-Belgian publishers, but the ISBN identified La Cinquième Couche as publisher.

Manouach's stated intention was to challenge the naturalisation of historical roles through species metaphor: representing all protagonists identically questions the implied fatalism of predator-and-prey iconography. Two weeks before the book's planned general release, Flammarion, the French rights-holder of Maus, served La Cinquième Couche with legal proceedings. Unable to sustain the costs of litigation, the press reached an out-of-court settlement; existing copies were destroyed.

The following year, 5c published MetaKatz (2013), a critical anthology documenting the affair, including legal filings, press responses, and essays, accompanied by a vinyl record of a musical piece commissioned to document the destruction of the remaining copies by fire.

=== Noirs (2014) — monochrome intervention ===
Also by Ilan Manouach, Noirs presents a faithful reproduction of Les Schtroumpfs noirs (The Black Smurfs) by Peyo and Yvan Delporte, identical to the original in format, page count, paper stock, and colour — with one exception: every ink, including black, magenta, and yellow, has been replaced by cyan. The result is a book in which blue Smurfs chase blue Smurfs to turn them into blue Smurfs, collapsing the chromatic distinction on which the original narrative's threat depends. The book's colophon states: "The new CMYK is CCCC. Four plates of cyan."

The work was first presented at the Angoulême festival in 2014, the same year the original album's US publication history (long suppressed due to its racial caricature) was receiving renewed critical attention.

=== Blanco (2015) — the unprinted book ===
Blanco is a 48-page hardcover colour album that contains no printing whatsoever: the pages are entirely blank. The object questions the material conditions of the printed book and the limits of the comics form by removing its essential content while preserving its physical conventions.

=== Abrégé de bande dessinée franco-belge (2018) — mash-up ===
A graphic mash-up of the Franco-Belgian comics tradition by Ilan Manouach, condensing and recombining iconic imagery from the canon into a single conceptual object....

=== Astro Boy #6 (2020) — Marxist ready-made ===
5c published a volume of Osamu Tezuka's Astro Boy — specifically, an existing volume — described as a conceptual ready-made, framed through a Marxist reading of the serialised cultural commodity. The book belongs to a strand of 5c's practice in which the act of publishing and framing an existing work itself constitutes the artistic gesture.

=== The Dark Knight Returns Book One (2021) — the unreadable e-book ===
Published by William Henne and Xavier Löwenthal, this volume presents itself as an e-book adaptation of Frank Miller's Batman: The Dark Knight Returns — but the book it contains is not a reproduction of the comic. Instead, its pages are filled with the raw PostScript source code of a PDF of the comic. The press's own description invites the reader to transcribe the code into a text editor, save the file with a .pdf extension, and open it in a PDF reader — thereby performing a laborious process of digital decoding by hand, a procedure that parodies both the supposed accessibility of digital publishing and the mystique of legacy print culture for francophone readers.

== Reception ==
The work of La Cinquième Couche and its principal authors has been covered by anglophone arts and comics publications including Hyperallergic, and The Comics Journal. Works published by 5c are archived in the UbuWeb online contemporary art collection. Manouach's research on conceptual comics has also been published in Leonardo, the MIT Press journal of arts and science.

== Chaïm Kaliski project (from 2023) ==
Since 2023, William Henne and Xavier Löwenthal have been working on an editorial project centred on the posthumous work of Chaïm Kaliski (1929–2015), a self-taught Brussels artist and child survivor of the Nazi Occupation whose father was deported to Auschwitz via the Dossin Barracks. Beginning around the age of sixty, Kaliski produced more than 6,000 drawings documenting the fate of Brussels' Jewish community during the Shoah. The 5c project gathers these into an ongoing series of volumes:

- Jim d'Etterbeek (June 2024; ISBN 978-2-390-08085-5)
- Dossin (August 2025; ISBN 978-2-390-08119-7)
- Le Génocide des Juifs d'Europe (forthcoming 2026)
- Auschwitz (forthcoming 2027)

== See also ==
- Xavier Löwenthal
- Ilan Manouach
- Chaïm Kaliski
- Frémok — comparable Belgian alternative comics publisher
