= Fun Home =

Graphic memoir by Alison Bechdel

Fun Home: A Family Tragicomic
- Cover of the hardback edition
- Author: Alison Bechdel
- Cover artist: Alison Bechdel
- Language: English
- Genre: Graphic novel, memoir
- Published: June 8, 2006 (Houghton Mifflin, hardcover); June 5, 2007 (Mariner Books, paperback)
- Publication place: United States
- Media type: Print (hardcover, paperback)
- Pages: 240 p.
- ISBN: 0-618-47794-2 (hardcover); ISBN 0-618-87171-3 (paperback)
- OCLC: 62127870
- Dewey Decimal: 741.5/973 22
- LC Class: PN6727.B3757 Z46 2006
- Followed by: Are You My Mother?

Fun Home: A Family Tragicomic is a 2006 graphic memoir by the American cartoonist Alison Bechdel, author of the comic strip Dykes to Watch Out For. It chronicles the author's childhood and youth in rural Pennsylvania, United States, focusing on her complex relationship with her father. The book addresses themes of sexual orientation, gender roles, suicide, emotional abuse, dysfunctional family life, and the role of literature in understanding oneself and one's family.

Writing and illustrating Fun Home took seven years, in part because of Bechdel's laborious artistic process, which includes photographing herself in poses for each human figure. Fun Home has been the subject of numerous academic publications in areas such as biography studies and cultural studies as part of a larger turn towards serious academic investment in the study of comics/sequential art.

Fun Home has been both a popular and critical success, and spent two weeks on the New York Times Best Seller list. In The New York Times Sunday Book Review, Sean Wilsey called it "a pioneering work, pushing two genres (comics and memoir) in multiple new directions." Several publications named Fun Home as one of the best books of 2006; it was also included in several lists of the best books of the 2000s. It was nominated for several awards, including the National Book Critics Circle Award and three Eisner Awards (winning the Eisner Award for Best Reality-Based Work). A French translation of Fun Home was serialized in the newspaper Libération; the book was an official selection of the Angoulême International Comics Festival and has been the subject of an academic conference in France. Fun Home also generated controversy, being challenged and removed from libraries due to its contents.

In 2013, a musical adaptation of Fun Home at The Public Theater enjoyed multiple extensions to its run, with book and lyrics written by Obie Award–winning playwright Lisa Kron, and score composed by Tony Award–nominated Jeanine Tesori. The production, directed by Sam Gold, was called "the first mainstream musical about a young lesbian." As a musical theatre piece, Fun Home was a finalist for the 2014 Pulitzer Prize for Drama, while winning the Lucille Lortel Award for Outstanding Musical, the New York Drama Critics' Circle Award for Best Musical, and the Obie Award for Musical Theater. The Broadway production opened in April 2015 and earned twelve nominations at the 69th Tony Awards, winning the Tony Award for Best Musical.

== Background ==
Bechdel states that her motivation for writing Fun Home was to reflect on why things turned out the way they did in her life. She reflects on her father's untimely death and whether Alison would have made different choices if she were in his position. This motivation is present throughout as she contrasts Bruce's artifice in hiding things with Alison's free and open self. The process of writing Fun Home required many references to literary works and archives to both accurately write and draw the scenes. As Bechdel wrote the book, she would reread the sources of her literary references, and this attention to detail in her references led to the development of each chapter having a different literary focus. On the process of writing the book, Bechdel says, "It was such a huge project: six or seven years of drawing and excavating. It was sort of like living in a trance."

Fun Home is drawn in black line art with a gray-blue ink wash. Sean Wilsey wrote that Fun Home's panels "combine the detail and technical proficiency of R. Crumb with a seriousness, emotional complexity and innovation completely its own." Writing in the Gay & Lesbian Review Worldwide, Diane Ellen Hamer contrasted "Bechdel's habit of drawing her characters very simply and yet distinctly" with "the attention to detail that she devotes to the background, those TV shows and posters on the wall, not to mention the intricacies of the funeral home as a recurring backdrop." Bechdel told an interviewer for The Comics Journal that the richness of each panel of Fun Home was very deliberate:

It's very important for me that people be able to read the images in the same kind of gradually unfolding way as they're reading the text. I don't like pictures that don't have information in them. I want pictures that you have to read, that you have to decode, that take time, that you can get lost in. Otherwise what's the point?

Alison Bechdel took photographs of herself posing as each character, to use as reference in her drawing. Here, she poses for a drawing of her father.

Bechdel wrote and illustrated Fun Home over a seven-year period. Her meticulous artistic process made the task of illustration slow. She began each page by creating a framework in Adobe Illustrator, on which she placed the text and drew rough figures. She used extensive photo reference and, for many panels, posed for each human figure herself, using a digital camera to record her poses. Bechdel also used photo reference for background elements. For example, to illustrate a panel depicting fireworks seen from a Greenwich Village rooftop on July 4, 1976, she used Google Images to find a photograph of the New York skyline taken from that particular building in that period. She also painstakingly copied by hand many family photographs, letters, local maps and excerpts from her own childhood journal, incorporating these images into her narrative. After using the reference material to draw a tight framework for the page, Bechdel copied the line art illustration onto plate finish Bristol board for the final inked page, which she then scanned into her computer. The gray-blue ink wash for each page was drawn on a separate page of watercolor paper, and combined with the inked image using Photoshop. Bechdel chose the bluish wash color for its flexibility, and because it had "a bleak, elegiac quality" which suited the subject matter. Bechdel attributes this detailed creative process to her "barely controlled obsessive-compulsive disorder".

== Plot summary ==
A panel from Fun Home depicting Bruce (left) and Alison Bechdel (right).

The narrative of Fun Home is non-linear and recursive. Incidents are told and re-told in the light of new information or themes. Bechdel describes the structure of Fun Home as a labyrinth, "going over the same material, but starting from the outside and spiraling in to the center of the story." In an essay on memoirs and truth in the academic journal PMLA, Nancy K. Miller explains that as Bechdel revisits scenes and themes "she re-creates memories in which the force of attachment generates the structure of the memoir itself." Additionally, the memoir derives its structure from allusions to various works of literature, Greek myth and visual arts; the events of Bechdel's family life during her childhood and adolescence are presented through this allusive lens. Miller notes that the narratives of the referenced literary texts "provide clues, both true and false, to the mysteries of family relations."

The memoir focuses on Bechdel's family, and is centered on her relationship with her father, Bruce. Bruce was a funeral director and high school English teacher in Beech Creek, where Alison and her siblings grew up. The book's title comes from the family nickname for the funeral home, the family business in which Bruce grew up and later worked; the phrase also refers ironically to Bruce's tyrannical domestic rule. Bruce's two occupations are reflected in Fun Home's focus on death and literature.

In the beginning of the book, the memoir exhibits Bruce's obsession with restoring the family's Victorian home. His obsessive need to restore the house is connected to his emotional distance from his family, which he expressed in coldness and occasional bouts of abusive rage. This emotional distance, in turn, is connected with his being a closeted homosexual. Bruce had homosexual relationships in the military and with his high school students; some of those students were also family friends and babysitters. At the age of 44, two weeks after his wife requested a divorce, he stepped into the path of an oncoming Sunbeam Bread truck and was killed. Although the evidence is equivocal, Alison concludes that her father died by suicide.

The story also deals with Alison's own struggle with her sexual identity, reaching a catharsis in the realization that she is a lesbian and her coming out to her parents. The memoir frankly examines her sexual development, including transcripts from her childhood diary, anecdotes about masturbation, and tales of her first sexual experiences with her girlfriend, Joan. In addition to their common homosexuality, Alison and Bruce share obsessive-compulsive tendencies and artistic leanings, albeit with opposing aesthetic senses: "I was Spartan to my father's Athenian. Modern to his Victorian. Butch to his nelly. Utilitarian to his aesthete." This opposition was a source of tension in their relationship, as both tried to express their dissatisfaction with their given gender roles: "Not only were we inverts, we were inversions of each other. While I was trying to compensate for something unmanly in him, he was attempting to express something feminine through me. It was a war of cross-purposes, and so doomed to perpetual escalation." However, shortly before Bruce's death, he and his daughter have a conversation in which Bruce confesses some of his sexual history; this is presented as a partial resolution to the conflict between father and daughter.

At several points in the book, Bechdel questions whether her decision to come out as a lesbian was one of the triggers for her father's suicide. This question is never answered definitively, but Bechdel closely examines the connection between her father's closeted sexuality and her own open lesbianism, revealing her debt to her father in both positive and negative lights.

== Themes ==
Bechdel describes her journey of discovering her own sexuality: "My realization at nineteen that I was a lesbian came about in a manner consistent with my bookish upbringing." Yet, hints of her sexual orientation arose early in her childhood; she wished "for the right to exchange [her] tank suit for a pair of shorts" in Cannes and for her brothers to call her Albert instead of Alison on one camping trip. Her father also exhibited homosexual behaviors, but the revelation of this made Bechdel feel uneasy. "I'd been upstaged, demoted from protagonist in my own drama to comic relief in my parents' tragedy". Father and daughter handled their issues differently. Bechdel chose to accept the fact, before she had a lesbian relationship, but her father hid his sexuality. He was afraid of coming out, as illustrated by "the fear in his eyes" when the conversation topic comes dangerously close to homosexuality.

In addition to sexual orientation, the memoir touches on the theme of gender identity. Bechdel had viewed her father as "a big sissy" while her father constantly tried to change his daughter into a more feminine person throughout her childhood.

The underlying theme of death is also portrayed. Unlike most young people, the Bechdel children have a tangible relationship with death because of the family mortuary business. Alison ponders whether her father's death was an accident or suicide, and finds it more likely that he killed himself purposefully.

== Allusions ==
The allusive literary references used in Fun Home are not merely structural or stylistic: Bechdel writes, "I employ these allusions ... not only as descriptive devices, but because my parents are most real to me in fictional terms. And perhaps my cool aesthetic distance itself does more to convey the Arctic climate of our family than any particular literary comparison." Bechdel, as the narrator, considers her relationship to her father through the myth of Daedalus and Icarus. As a child, she confused her family and their Gothic Revival home with the Addams Family seen in the cartoons of Charles Addams. Bruce Bechdel's suicide is discussed with reference to Albert Camus' novel A Happy Death and essay The Myth of Sisyphus. His careful construction of an aesthetic and intellectual world is compared to The Great Gatsby by F. Scott Fitzgerald, and the narrator suggests that Bruce Bechdel modeled elements of his life after Fitzgerald's, as portrayed in the biography The Far Side of Paradise. His wife Helen is compared with the protagonists of the Henry James novels Washington Square and The Portrait of a Lady. Helen Bechdel was an amateur actress, and plays in which she acted are also used to illuminate aspects of her marriage. She met Bruce Bechdel when the two were appearing in a college production of The Taming of the Shrew, and Alison Bechdel intimates that this was "a harbinger of my parents' later marriage". Helen Bechdel's role as Lady Bracknell in a local production of The Importance of Being Earnest is shown in some detail; Bruce Bechdel is compared with Oscar Wilde. His homosexuality is also examined with allusion to Marcel Proust's In Search of Lost Time. The father and daughter's artistic and obsessive-compulsive tendencies are discussed with reference to E. H. Shepard's illustrations for The Wind in the Willows. Bruce and Alison Bechdel exchange hints about their sexualities by exchanging memoirs: the father gives the daughter Earthly Paradise, an autobiographical collection of the writings of Colette; shortly afterwards, in what Alison Bechdel describes as "an eloquent unconscious gesture", she leaves a library copy of Kate Millett's memoir Flying for him. Finally, returning to the Daedalus myth, Alison Bechdel casts herself as Stephen Dedalus and her father as Leopold Bloom in James Joyce's Ulysses, with parallel references to the myth of Telemachus and Odysseus.

The chapter headings, too, are all literary allusions. The first chapter, "Old Father, Old Artificer", refers to a line in Joyce's A Portrait of the Artist as a Young Man, and the second, "A Happy Death", invokes the Camus novel. "That Old Catastrophe" is a line from Wallace Stevens's "Sunday Morning", and "In the Shadow of the Young Girls in Flower" is the literal translation of the title of one of the volumes of Marcel Proust's In Search of Lost Time, which is usually given in English as Within a Budding Grove.

In addition to the literary allusions which are explicitly acknowledged in the text, Bechdel incorporates visual allusions to television programs and other items of pop culture into her artwork, often as images on a television in the background of a panel. These visual references include the film It's a Wonderful Life, Bert and Ernie of Sesame Street, the Smiley Face, Yogi Bear, Batman, the Road Runner and Wile E. Coyote, the resignation of Richard Nixon and The Flying Nun.

== Analysis ==
Heike Bauer, a professor at the University of London, categorizes Fun Home as part of the queer transnational archive for its contribution towards the "felt experiences" of the LGBTQ community. Bauer argues that books provide a relatable source, or a felt experience, as Alison uses literature to understand her own feelings in a homophobic society. Bauer notes that as Alison finds relatable literature for her experiences, Fun Home itself becomes a similar outlet for its readers by increasing representation of LGBTQ literature.

Valerie Rohy, an English professor at the University of Vermont, questions the authenticity of Alison's archives in the book. Rohy explores how Alison uses her diary in her childhood and readings in her young adulthood to both document her life and learn about herself through written works. On the uncertainty relating to Bruce's cause of death, Rohy says Alison concludes it to be a suicide to fill in her knowledge gap of the situation, similar to her use of books to fill in gaps in her own understanding of her childhood.

Judith Kegan Gardiner, a professor of English and Gender and Women's Studies at the University of Illinois, Chicago, views Fun Home as queer literature that bends the literary norms of the graphic novel genre, arguing Bechdel combines both tragedy, normally associated with men, and humor, normally associated with women, by discussing her father's death using a comic book style and dark humor. Gardiner argues Bechdel takes control of creating an open culture for lesbian feminist work through Fun Home by focusing less on Bruce's wrongdoings regarding minors, and more on the tragedy faced by Alison and the guilt towards his subsequent death after her coming out. She also says that by breaking the gender norms of the genre, particularly within lesbian and gay literature, Fun Home has dramatically affected representation.

== Publication and reception ==
Fun Home was first printed in hardcover by Houghton Mifflin (Boston, New York City) on June 8, 2006. This edition appeared on the New York Times' Hardcover Nonfiction bestseller list for two weeks, covering the period from June 18 to July 1, 2006. It continued to sell well, and by February 2007 there were 55,000 copies in print. A trade paperback edition was published in the United Kingdom by Random House under the Jonathan Cape imprint on September 14, 2006; Houghton Mifflin published a paperback edition under the Mariner Books imprint on June 5, 2007.

The French edition of Fun Home, published by Éditions Denoël

In the summer of 2006, a French translation of Fun Home was serialized in the Paris newspaper Libération (which had previously serialized Persepolis by Marjane Satrapi). This translation, by Corinne Julve and Lili Sztajn, was subsequently published by Éditions Denoël on October 26, 2006. In January 2007, Fun Home was an official selection of the Angoulême International Comics Festival. In the same month, the Anglophone Studies department of the Université François Rabelais, Tours sponsored an academic conference on Bechdel's work, with presentations in Paris and Tours. At this conference, papers were presented examining Fun Home from several perspectives: as containing "trajectories" filled with paradoxical tension; as a text interacting with images as a paratext; and as a search for meaning using drag as a metaphor. These papers and others on Bechdel and her work were later published in the peer-reviewed journal GRAAT (Groupe de Recherches Anglo-Américaines de Tours, or Tours Anglo-American Research Group).

An Italian translation was published by Rizzoli in January 2007. In Brazil, Conrad Editora published a Portuguese translation in 2007. A German translation was published by Kiepenheuer & Witsch in January 2008. The book has also been translated into Hungarian, Korean, and Polish, and a Chinese translation has been scheduled for publication.

In Spring 2012, Bechdel and literary scholar Hillary Chute co-taught a course at the University of Chicago titled "Lines of Transmission: Comics and Autobiography".

=== Reviews and awards ===
The Times of London described Fun Home as "a profound and important book;" Salon.com called it "a beautiful, assured piece of work;" and The New York Times ran two separate reviews and a feature on the memoir. In one New York Times review, Sean Wilsey called Fun Home "a pioneering work, pushing two genres (comics and memoir) in multiple new directions" and "a comic book for lovers of words". Joey Soloway, writing in the Los Angeles Times as Jill Soloway, praised the work overall but commented that Bechdel's reference-heavy prose is at times "a little opaque". Similarly, a reviewer in The Tyee felt that "the narrator's insistence on linking her story to those of various Greek myths, American novels and classic plays" was "forced" and "heavy-handed". By contrast, the Seattle Times' reviewer wrote positively of the book's use of literary reference, calling it "staggeringly literate". The Village Voice said that Fun Home "shows how powerfully—and economically—the medium can portray autobiographical narrative. With two-part visual and verbal narration that isn't simply synchronous, comics presents a distinctive narrative idiom in which a wealth of information may be expressed in a highly condensed fashion."

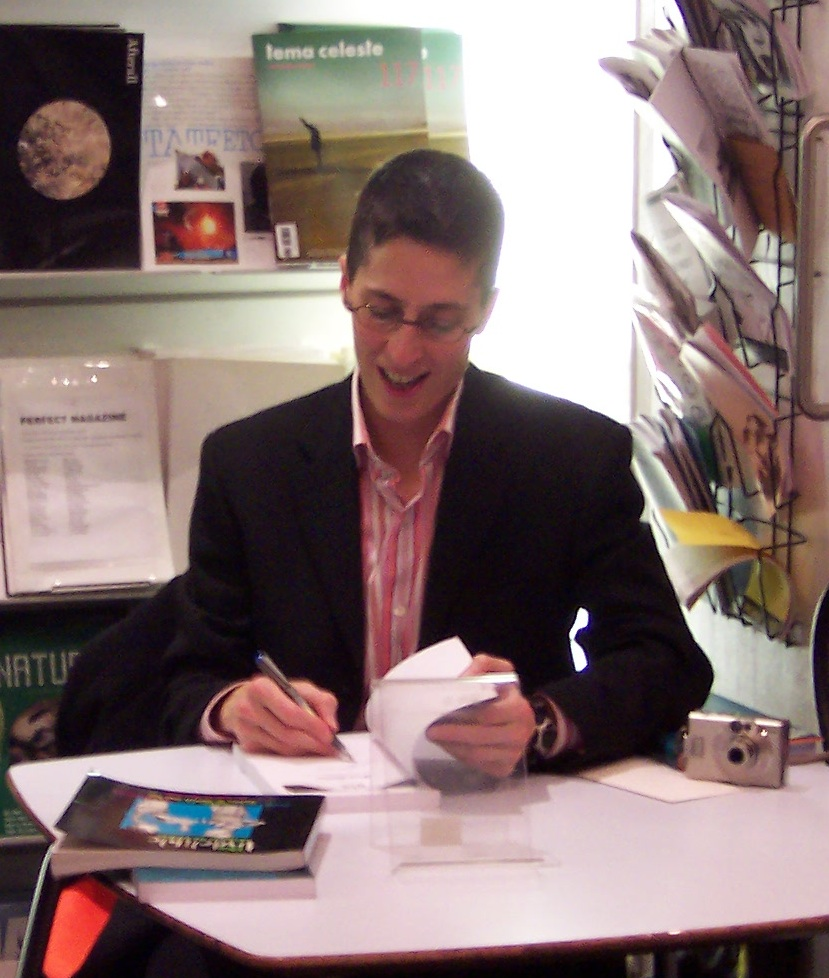
Alison Bechdel at a London signing for Fun Home

Several publications listed Fun Home as one of the best books of 2006, including The New York Times, Amazon.com, The Times of London, New York magazine and Publishers Weekly, which ranked it as the best comic book of 2006. Salon.com named Fun Home the best nonfiction debut of 2006, admitting that they were fudging the definition of "debut" and saying, "Fun Home shimmers with regret, compassion, annoyance, frustration, pity and love—usually all at the same time and never without a pervasive, deeply literary irony about the near-impossible task of staying true to yourself, and to the people who made you who you are." Entertainment Weekly called it the best nonfiction book of the year, and Time named Fun Home the best book of 2006, describing it as "the unlikeliest literary success of 2006" and "a masterpiece about two people who live in the same house but different worlds, and their mysterious debts to each other."

Fun Home was a finalist for the 2006 National Book Critics Circle Award, in the memoir/autobiography category. In 2007, Fun Home won the GLAAD Media Award for Outstanding Comic Book, the Stonewall Book Award for non-fiction, the Publishing Triangle-Judy Grahn Nonfiction Award, and the Lambda Literary Award in the "Lesbian Memoir and Biography" category. Fun Home was nominated for the 2007 Eisner Awards in two categories, Best Reality-Based Work and Best Graphic Album, and Bechdel was nominated as Best Writer/Artist. Fun Home won the Eisner for Best Reality-Based Work. In 2008, Entertainment Weekly placed Fun Home at No. 68 in its list of "New Classics" (defined as "the 100 best books from 1983 to 2008"). The Guardian included Fun Home in its series "1000 novels everyone must read", noting its "beautifully rendered" details.

In 2009, Fun Home was listed as one of the best books of the previous decade by The Times of London, Entertainment Weekly and Salon.com, and as one of the best comic books of the decade by The Onion's A.V. Club.

In 2010, the Los Angeles Times literary blog "Jacket Copy" named Fun Home as one of "20 classic works of gay literature". In 2019, the graphic novel was ranked 33rd on The Guardian's list of the 100 best books of the 21st century. In 2024, The New York Times ranked it #35 of the 100 best books of the 21st century.

=== Challenges and attempted banning ===
==== 2006: Marshall, Missouri ====
In October 2006, a resident of Marshall, Missouri, attempted to have Fun Home and Craig Thompson's Blankets, both graphic novels, removed from the city's public library. Supporters of the books' removal characterized them as "pornography" and expressed concern that they would be read by children. Marshall Public Library Director Amy Crump defended the books as having been well-reviewed in "reputable, professional book review journals", and characterized the removal attempt as a step towards "the slippery slope of censorship". On October 11, 2006, the library's board appointed a committee to create a materials selection policy, and removed Fun Home and Blankets from circulation until the new policy was approved. The committee "decided not to assign a prejudicial label or segregate [the books] by a prejudicial system", and presented a materials selection policy to the board. On March 14, 2007, the Marshall Public Library Board of Trustees voted to return both Fun Home and Blankets to the library's shelves. Bechdel described the attempted banning as "a great honor", and described the incident as "part of the whole evolution of the graphic-novel form."

==== 2008: University of Utah ====
In 2008, an instructor at the University of Utah placed Fun Home on the syllabus of a mid-level English course, "Critical Introduction to English Literary Forms". One student objected to the assignment, and was given an alternate reading in accordance with the university's religious accommodation policy. The student subsequently contacted a local organization called "No More Pornography", which started an online petition calling for the book to be removed from the syllabus. Vincent Pecora, the chair of the university's English department, defended Fun Home and the instructor. The university said that it had no plans to remove the book.

==== 2013: Palmetto Family ====
In 2013, Palmetto Family Council, a conservative South Carolina group affiliated with Focus on the Family and the Family Research Council, challenged the inclusion of Fun Home as a reading selection for incoming freshmen at the College of Charleston. Palmetto Family president Oran Smith called the book "pornographic". Bechdel disputed this, saying that pornography is designed to cause sexual arousal, which is not the purpose of her book. The controversy made its way to the state's Senate and House of Representatives. In the Senate they were voting on whether or not to make budget cuts to the summer reading program for incoming freshmen. Senator Brad Hutto used a four-hour filibuster to delay the voting process and felt that this was "a challenge to academic freedom and an act that would shame our state." There was an alternative for students who found the selection of reading chosen by the institution to be offensive: they were offered a different book in the program's list. The past president of College of Charleston, Glenn McConnell, had contradicting opinions on Fun Home. When asked about the reading he stated that professors have academic freedom when it comes to what they teach in the classroom, but they should also ask themselves if it is worth it and "it certainly wouldn't be my book of choice." The punishment given to the college was a cut to funding to prevent the institution from exploring identity and sexuality. Many tried to fight this because it was seen as a restriction and became a "battlefield in a full-blown culture war."

College provost George Hynd and associate provost Lynne Ford defended the choice of Fun Home, pointing out that its themes of identity are especially appropriate for college freshmen. However, seven months later, the Republican-led South Carolina House of Representatives Ways and Means Committee cut the college's funding by $52,000, the cost of the summer reading program, to punish the college for selecting Fun Home. Rep. Garry Smith, who proposed the cuts, said that in choosing Fun Home the university was "promoting the gay and lesbian lifestyle". Rep. Stephen Goldfinch, another supporter of the cuts, said, "This book trampled on freedom of conservatives. ... Teaching with this book, and the pictures, goes too far." Bechdel called the funding cut "sad and absurd" and pointed out that Fun Home "is after all about the toll that this sort of small-mindedness takes on people's lives." The full state House of Representatives subsequently voted to retain the cuts. College of Charleston students and faculty reacted with dismay and protests to the proposed cuts, and the college's Student Government Association unanimously passed a resolution urging that the funding be restored. A coalition of ten free-speech organizations wrote a letter to the South Carolina Senate Finance Committee, urging them to restore the funds and warning them that "[p]enalising state educational institutions financially simply because members of the legislature disapprove of specific elements of the educational program is educationally unsound and constitutionally suspect". The letter was co-signed by the National Coalition Against Censorship, the ACLU of South Carolina, the American Association of University Professors, the Modern Language Association, the Association of College and Research Libraries, the American Booksellers Foundation for Free Expression, the Comic Book Legal Defense Fund, the Association of American Publishers, the National Council of Teachers of English and the American Library Association. After a nearly week-long debate in which Fun Home and Bechdel were compared to slavery, Charles Manson and Adolf Hitler, the state Senate voted to restore the funding, but redirect the funds towards study of the United States Constitution and The Federalist Papers; the university was also required to provide alternate books to students who object to an assignment due to a "religious, moral or cultural belief". Governor Nikki Haley approved the budget measure penalizing the university.

==== 2015: Duke University ====
In 2015, the book was assigned as summer reading for the incoming class of 2019 at Duke University. Several students objected to the book on moral and/or religious grounds.

==== 2018: Somerset County, New Jersey ====
In 2018, parents challenged Fun Home in the Watchung Hills Regional High School curriculum. The challenge was rejected, and the book remained in the school. After the Watchung Hills High School challenge, administrators at nearby North Hunterdon High School removed Fun Home from their libraries as well, but in February the following year the book was restored. A lawsuit was filed in May 2019 against the administrators of the Watchung Hills school, seeking the removal of the book. The lawsuit claimed that if the book was not removed, "minors will suffer irreparable harm and...New Jersey statutes will be violated."

==== 2022: Wentzville, Missouri ====
In January 2022, the Wentzille school board in Missouri voted 4–3 to ban Fun Home, going against the review committee's 8–1 vote to retain the book in the district's libraries. The ban included three other books, as well: George M. Johnson's All Boys Aren't Blue, Toni Morrison's The Bluest Eye, and Kiese Laymon's Heavy.

==== 2022: Rapid City, South Dakota ====
In May 2022, parents challenged Fun Home in the Rapid City Area Schools, claiming the book is "pornographic" and the overall concept of having books similar to Fun Home in schools is a "Marxist Revolution." Some teachers disagreed because the book represents the highly marginalized voices of the LGBTQ+ community. The school board decided to temporarily remove the book.

==== 2023: Sheboygan, Wisconsin ====
In January 2023, Sheboygan South High School principal, Kevin Formolo, removed Fun Home from the school's library after community members expressed outrage about the book's inclusion. Supporters of the principal's decision say the sexual content of the book is inappropriate in a school setting. Others equated the removal of the book from the school's library to discrimination.

Two other books were also removed from the library by the principal: Bechdel's Are You My Mother? – which is a companion to Fun Home – and Maia Kobabe's Gender Queer.

==== 2025: Alberta, Canada ====
In July 2025, the conservative provincial government of Alberta, led by Premier Danielle Smith, issued an order to school libraries restricting books with "explicit sexual content". Alberta’s Education and Childcare Minister Demetrios Nicolaides did not provide a list of books to be removed, but provided four examples of sexually explicit content: Fun Home by Bechdel, Gender Queer by Maia Kobabe; Blankets by Craig Thompson; and Flamer by Mike Curato. Notably, all four examples of objectionable materials are graphic novels depicting coming-of-age and LGBTQ subjects.

In August 2025, the Edmonton Public School Board's internally distributed a list of over 200 books to be removed from library shelves in order to comply with the new policy. The list included literary classics, among them The Handmaid's Tale, Brave New World, and I Know Why the Caged Bird Sings. The list was leaked to the public, prompting a major backlash that led the government to pause its implementation.

In September 2025, the government announced a revised policy that requires removal of only visual representations deemed sexually explicit. The examples of objectionable materials continue to include Fun Home.

== Adaptations ==
=== Stage musical ===
Fun Home has been adapted into a stage musical, with a book by Lisa Kron and music by Jeanine Tesori. The musical was developed through a 2009 workshop at the Ojai Playwrights Conference and workshopped in 2012 at the Sundance Theatre Lab and The Public Theater's Public Lab. Bechdel did not participate in the musical's creation. She expected her story to seem artificial and distant on stage, but she came to feel that the musical had the opposite effect, bringing the "emotional heart" of the story closer than even her book did.

The musical debuted Off-Broadway at The Public Theater on September 30, 2013. The production was directed by Sam Gold and starred Michael Cerveris and Judy Kuhn as Bruce and Helen Bechdel. The role of Alison was played by three actors: Beth Malone played the adult Alison, reviewing and narrating her life, Alexandra Socha played "Medium Alison" as a student at Oberlin, discovering her sexuality, and Sydney Lucas played Small Alison, at age 10. It received largely positive reviews, and its limited run was extended several times until January 12, 2014. The musical was a finalist for the 2014 Pulitzer Prize for Drama; it also won the Lucille Lortel Award for Outstanding Musical, the New York Drama Critics' Circle Award for Best Musical, and the Obie Award for Musical Theater. Alison Bechdel drew a one-page comic about the musical adaptation for the newspaper Seven Days.

A Broadway production opened at Circle in the Square Theatre in April 2015. The production won five 2015 Tony Awards, including Best Musical, and ran for 26 previews and 582 regular performances until September 10, 2016, with a national tour that began in October that year. Kalle Oskari Mattila, in The Atlantic, argued that the musical's marketing campaign "obfuscates rather than clarifies" the queer narrative of the original novel.

=== Potential musical film ===
In January 2020, Jake Gyllenhaal and a partner secured the rights to produce a film version of the musical, planning to star Gyllenhaal as Bruce Bechdel with Sam Gold directing and Amazon MGM Studios distributing. In 2023, Alison Bechdel said she would not have direct involvement on the project and Gyllenhaal was no longer involved in any upcoming film adaptation. She did, however, say "They're still trying to make this movie happen, but it will have a different star." However, on April 2, 2024, Gyllenhaal was confirmed to remain involved on the film as a producer when he and his Nine Stories Productions banner signed a first-look deal with Amazon MGM.

== See also ==
- List of feminist comic books
- Dykes to Watch Out For
- Portrayal of women in comics
