= Alison Bechdel =

American cartoonist (born 1960)

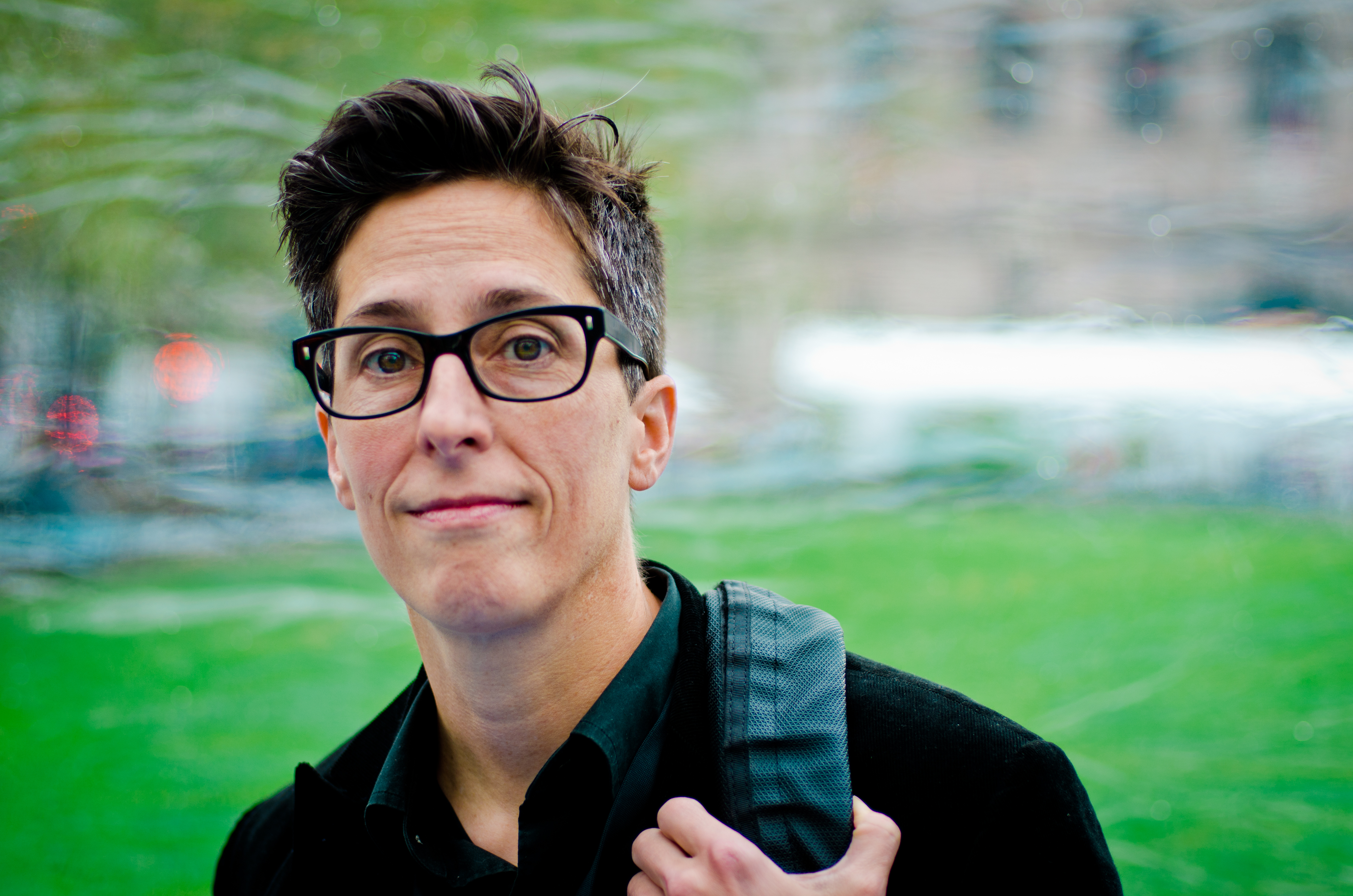
- Bechdel at the Boston Book Festival in 2011
- Born: September 10, 1960 (age 66); Lock Haven, Pennsylvania, U.S.
- Education: Simon's Rock College (AA); Oberlin College (BA)
- Occupations: Cartoonist; author
- Spouses: Amy Rubin (m. 2004; voided 2004) Holly Rae Taylor (m. 2015)
- Writing career
- Genres: Autobiography, social commentary
- Notable works: Dykes to Watch Out For, Fun Home, Are You My Mother?
- Movement: Underground
- Website: dykestowatchoutfor.com

Alison Bechdel (/ˈbɛkdəl/ BEK-dəl; born September 10, 1960) is an American cartoonist. Originally known for the comic strip Dykes to Watch Out For, she came to critical and commercial success in 2006 with her graphic novel memoir Fun Home. Fun Home was adapted as a musical, which won a Tony Award for Best Musical in 2015. In 2012, she released her second graphic memoir Are You My Mother?. She was a 2014 recipient of the MacArthur "Genius" Award. She is also known for originating the Bechdel test.

== Early life ==
Bechdel was born in Lock Haven, Pennsylvania. She is the daughter of Helen Augusta (née Fontana) and Bruce Allen Bechdel. Her family was Roman Catholic. Her father was an army veteran who was stationed in West Germany. He was a high school English teacher, working full-time and operating a funeral home part-time. Her mother was an actress and teacher. Both of her parents contributed to her career as a cartoonist. She has two brothers: Bruce "Christian" Bechdel II and John Bechdel, a keyboard player who has worked with many bands including Fear Factory, Ministry, Prong and Killing Joke. Bechdel left high school a year early and earned her A.A. in 1979 from Bard College at Simon's Rock. She graduated with a degree in studio arts and art history in 1981 from Oberlin College. After her father died in 1980, her mother sold the family house in Beech Creek, Pennsylvania, the small town where Bechdel grew up, and moved to Bellefonte, with her long-time partner Robert Fenichel.

== Career ==
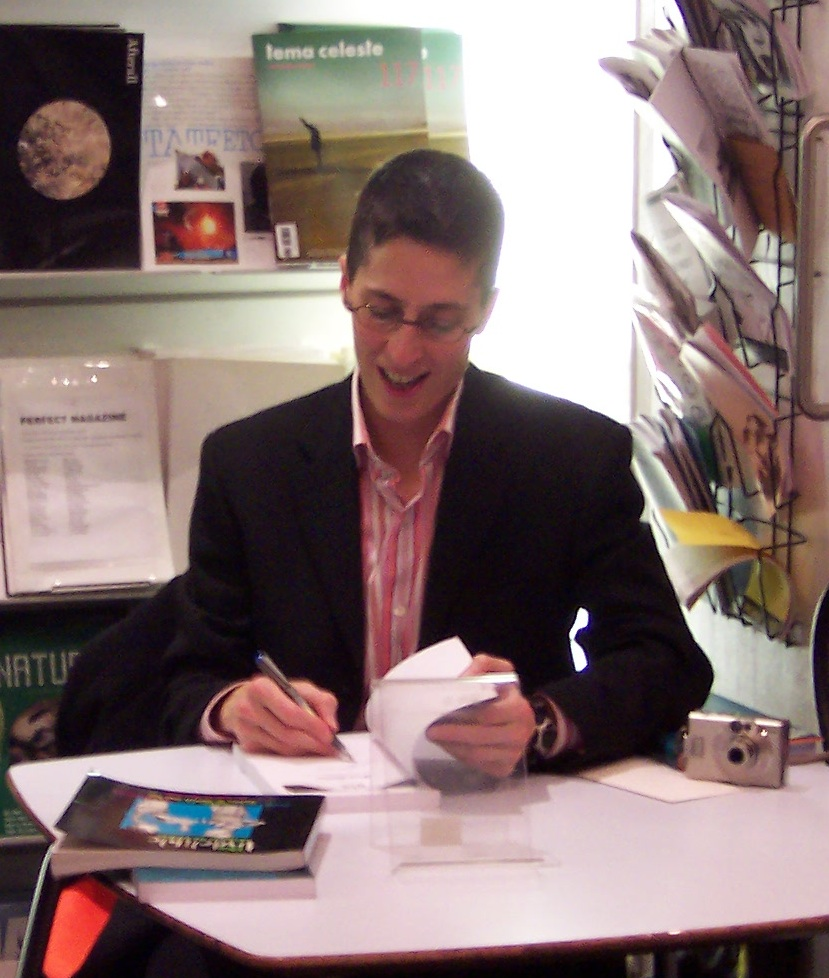
Bechdel at a London signing for Fun Home in 2006

Bechdel moved to Manhattan during the summer of 1981 and applied to several art schools, but was rejected and worked in many office jobs in the publishing industry.

She began Dykes to Watch Out For as a single drawing labeled "Marianne, dissatisfied with the morning brew: Dykes to Watch Out For, plate no. 27". An acquaintance recommended she send her work to WomaNews, a feminist newspaper, which published her first work in its June 1983 issue. Bechdel gradually moved from her early single-panel drawings to multi-paneled strips. Dykes to Watch Out For began this process, developing into a series of posters and postcards, allowing for people to have a look into the urban lesbian community. After a year, other outlets began running the strip.

In the first years, Dykes to Watch Out For consisted of unconnected strips without a regular cast or serialized storyline. However, its structure eventually evolved into a focus on following a set group of lesbian characters. In 1986, Firebrand Books published a collection of the strips to date. In 1987, Bechdel introduced her regular characters, Mo and her friends, while living in St. Paul, Minnesota. Dykes to Watch Out For is the origin of the "Bechdel test", intended as a joke, which has become a frequently used metric in cultural discussion of film. In 1988, she began a short-lived page-length strip about the staff of a queer newspaper, titled "Servants to the Cause", for The Advocate. Bechdel has written and drawn autobiographical strips and has done illustrations for magazines and websites. The success of Dykes to Watch Out For allowed Bechdel to quit her day job in 1990 to work on the strip full-time. In 1991, she made her move to Vermont to continue her cartooning career there. She likened her reasoning for moving to Vermont to that of the von Trapp family's in the Sound of Music, "Absence of Nazis, presence of hills."

In November 2006, Bechdel was invited to sit on the Usage Panel of the American Heritage Dictionary. In 2012, Bechdel was a Mellon Residential Fellow for Arts and Practice at the Richard and Mary L. Gray Center at the University of Chicago and co-taught "Lines of Transmission: Comics & Autobiography" with Professor Hillary Chute. On April 6, 2017, Bechdel was appointed as Vermont's third Cartoonist Laureate.

In 2014, she posted a comic strip based on her Fun Home! The Musical! After Donald Trump's election in 2016 as U.S. president she posted three new episodes of Dykes to Watch Out For: "Pièce de Résistance", "Postcards From the Edge", and "Things Fall Apart."

From January 30, 2018 to May 20, 2018, Bechdel's work was shown in a dedicated exhibit, "Self-Confessed! The Inappropriately Intimate Comics of Alison Bechdel," at the Fleming Museum of Art in Burlington, Vermont.

Bechdel became Professor in the Practice, English and Film & Media Studies at Yale University in 2024.

Bechdel resides in Bolton, Vermont, and works with the Vermont-based alternative weekly Seven Days.

== Graphic novels ==
=== Fun Home ===
In 2006, Bechdel published Fun Home: A Family Tragicomic, an autobiographical "tragicomic" chronicling her childhood and the years before and after her father's suicide. It follows the past and present phases of her relationship with her parents, principally her father, and depicts the hardships individuals face when coming out. Fun Home has received more mainstream attention than Bechdel's earlier work, with reviews in Entertainment Weekly, People and several features in The New York Times. Fun Home spent two weeks on The New York Times Bestseller List for Hardcover Nonfiction.

Fun Home was hailed as one of the best books of 2006 by numerous sources, including The New York Times, amazon.com, The Times of London, Publishers Weekly, salon.com, New York magazine, and Entertainment Weekly.

Time magazine named Alison Bechdel's Fun Home number one of its "10 Best Books of the Year". Lev Grossman and Richard LeCayo described Fun Home as "the unlikeliest literary success of 2006," and called it "a stunning memoir about a girl growing up in a small town with her cryptic, perfectionist dad and slowly realizing that a) she is gay and b) he is too... Bechdel's breathtakingly smart commentary duets with eloquent line drawings. Forget genre and sexual orientation: this is a masterpiece about two people who live in the same house but different worlds, and their mysterious debts to each other."

Fun Home was a finalist for the 2006 National Book Critics Circle Award in the memoir/autobiography category. It also won the 2007 Eisner Award for Best Reality-Based Work. Fun Home was nominated for the Best Graphic Album award, and Bechdel was nominated for Best Writer/Artist.

In 2014, the Republican-led South Carolina House of Representatives Ways and Means Committee considered cutting the College of Charleston's funding by $52,000 for selecting Fun Home. The addition of Fun Home to the summer reading list caused significant backlash from some conservative students who found the depiction of sexuality to be "immoral", and "pornographic" for "graphically showing lesbian acts."

Fun Home premiered as a musical Off-Broadway at The Public Theater on September 30, 2013, and opened on October 22, 2013. The score was written by Jeanine Tesori and the book and lyrics were written by Lisa Kron. Kron and Tesori made history as the first all-woman team to win a Tony Award for best score. Originally scheduled to run through November 3, 2013, the run was extended multiple times and the musical closed on January 12, 2014. The Public Theater production was directed by Sam Gold. Sets and costumes were by David Zinn, lighting by Ben Stanton, sound by Kai Harada, projections by Jim Findlay and Jeff Sugg and choreography by Danny Mefford. The musical played at Broadway's Circle in the Square Theatre, with previews from March 27, 2015, and an official opening on April 19, 2015, running to September 10, 2016. Sam Gold, who directed the Public Theater production, also directed the show on Broadway, leading the Off-Broadway production team. The Off-Broadway cast reprised their roles on Broadway, except for the actors playing John, Christian, and Medium Alison. The Broadway musical won five Tony Awards, including Best Musical, Best Performance by an Actor in Leading Role in a Musical, Best Original Score (Music and/or Lyrics) Written for the Theatre, Best Book of a Musical, and Best Direction of a Musical.

On January 3, 2020, it was announced that Jake Gyllenhaal and his Nine Stories Productions banner secured the rights to adapt the musical version of Fun Home into a film. Sam Gold, who directed the Broadway production, is set to helm the film, in which Gyllenhaal will star as Bruce Bechdel.

=== Are You My Mother? ===
Bechdel suspended work on Dykes to Watch Out For in 2008 so that she could work on her second graphic memoir, Are You My Mother?: A Comic Drama, which was released in May 2012. It focuses on her relationship with her mother. Bechdel described its themes as "the self, subjectivity, desire, the nature of reality, that sort of thing," which is a paraphrase of a quote from Virginia Woolf's To the Lighthouse. An excerpt entitled "Mirror" was included in The Best American Comics 2013.

=== The Secret to Superhuman Strength ===
Bechdel published another memoir, The Secret to Superhuman Strength, in 2021. The book chronicles Bechdel's fascination with fitness, jumping from sport to sport and discovering that she gets in her own way.

=== Spent: A Comic Novel ===
Bechdel's graphic novel Spent: A Comic Novel was released by HarperCollins Publishers in May 2025. The novel features a cartoonist, also named Alison Bechdel, running a pygmy goat sanctuary in Vermont while attempting to write a book about capitalism. The character is based on Bechdel but contains many fictionalized details, including the goat farm.

== Artistic style ==
Her artistic process when creating her graphic novels involves a lot of posing and photographing herself for reference, not just for drawings of herself, but very notably for drawings of her father in Fun Home and her mother in Are You My Mother?.

== Personal life ==
Bechdel came out as a lesbian at age 19. Her sexuality and gender non-conformity are a large part of the core message of her work, and she has said that "the secret subversive goal of my work is to show that women, not just lesbians, are regular human beings". In February 2004, Bechdel married Amy Rubin, her girlfriend since 1992, in a civil ceremony in San Francisco. However, all same-sex marriage licenses given by the city at that time were subsequently voided by the California Supreme Court. Bechdel and Rubin separated in 2006. She subsequently lived with her partner Holly Rae Taylor, a painter, for seven and a half years before their marriage in July 2015. She lives in Bolton, Vermont, in a house she bought in 1996, adding her own studio to work in. Bechdel uses she/her pronouns.

== Selected works ==
- The Essential Dykes to Watch Out For (Houghton Mifflin, 2008, ISBN 978-0618968800)
- Fun Home: A Family Tragicomic (Houghton Mifflin, 2006, ISBN 0-618-47794-2)
- Are You My Mother?: A Comic Drama (Houghton Mifflin Harcourt, 2012, ISBN 0-618-98250-7)
- The Secret to Superhuman Strength (Houghton Mifflin Harcourt, 2021, ISBN 978-0224101905)
- Spent (HarperCollins, 2025, ISBN 978-0063278929)

== Awards ==
- 2006 Time Magazine listed Fun Home as one of its 10 Best Books of the Year
- 2007 Eisner Award for Best Reality-Based Work
- 2007 Stonewall Book Awards – Israel Fishman Non-Fiction Award
- 2010 Women Cartoonists Hall of Fame (presented by Friends of Lulu)
- 2012 Guggenheim Fellowship
- 2012 Inkpot Award
- 2012 The Bill Whitehead Award for Lifetime Achievement from Publishing Triangle
- 2013 The International Forum for Psychoanalytic Education Distinguished Educator Award
- 2014 MacArthur Fellowship
- 2014 Lambda Board of Trustees Award for Excellence in Literature
- 2015 The Erikson Institute Prize for Excellence in Mental Health Media
- 2019 Harvey Awards Hall of Fame inductee. The award was presented to Bechdel by Chip Kidd during the Harvey Awards at New York Comic Con.
- 2022 PEN Oakland – Josephine Miles Literary Award for The Secret to Superhuman Strength.
- 2023 Golden Crown Literary Society Trailblazer Award

For her outstanding contributions to the comic art form, in 2016 ComicsAlliance listed Bechdel as one of twelve women cartoonists deserving of lifetime achievement recognition.

== See also ==
- Female comics creators
- Comics
