= Mark Larson =

American politician

Member of the Vermont House of Representatives from the Chittenden 3-2 district
- In office January 3, 2001 – August 17, 2011
- Preceded by: James J. McNamara
- Succeeded by: Jean O'Sullivan

Personal details
- Born: February 25, 1970 (age 56) Boston, Massachusetts, USA
- Party: Democratic
- Education: Bucknell University (BA)

Mark Larson (born February 25, 1970) is an American politician from the state of Vermont. A member of the Democratic Party, he represented Chittenden County in the Vermont House of Representatives from 2001 to 2011.

== Political career ==
Larson was elected to the Vermont House in 2000, serving until 2011. He was vice chair of the Appropriations Committee and co-chaired the Health Care Reform Commission.

On January 26, 2006, Larson introduced draft legislation to grant same-sex couples the right to marry and allow clergy to refuse to perform same-sex marriages if this would violate their religious beliefs. The bill failed in the General Assembly. On February 6, 2009, Larson introduced a bill to legalize same-sex marriage on behalf of 59 co-sponsors. Republican Governor Jim Douglas said economic and budgetary issues should be the legislature's first concern. The State Senate approved its version of the legislation on March 23 by a vote of 26 to 4. Douglas announced his intention to veto the bill on March 25. On April 3, the House passed an amended version of the bill 95–52, several votes shy of a veto-proof two-thirds majority. On April 6, 2009, the Vermont Senate approved the amendments made by the House. The governor vetoed the legislation the same day. On April 7, 2009, the Senate overrode the veto by a 23–5 vote and the House overrode it 100–49, the first time since 1990 that a Vermont governor's veto was overridden. Six of those voting in favor of the legislation were Republicans.

Larson introduced H 202 on February 8, 2011, titled Single-Payer and Unified Health System. The bill passed the House on March 24, 2011, with 94 votes in favor and 49 against. The bill then passed the Senate on April 26, 2011, with 21 votes in favor and 9 against. The conference report legislation passed the Senate on May 3, 2011, with 21 votes in favor and 9 opposed, and the House on May 4, 2011, with 94 votes in favor and 49 against. Governor Peter Shumlin signed the bill on May 26, 2011. Larson described Green Mountain Care's provisions "as close as we can get [to single-payer] at the state level." Vermont abandoned the plan in 2014, citing costs and tax increases as too high to implement.

After leaving the legislature, Larson became Commissioner of the Vermont Department of Vermont Health Access (DVHA). He stepped down from his position in March 2015.

Larson endorsed Vermont Progressive Party nominee Emma Mulvaney-Stanak in the 2024 Burlington mayoral election.

== Personal life ==
Larson lives in Burlington.
