= 2027 Burlington mayoral election =

Local election in Vermont, US

- March 2, 2027
Incumbent mayor
Emma Mulvaney-Stanak
Progressive

The 2027 Burlington mayoral election will be held on March 2, 2027, to elect the mayor of Burlington, Vermont. Incumbent Progressive mayor Emma Mulvaney-Stanak is eligible to run for re-election to a second term in office. Local elections in Burlington use ranked-choice voting.

== Progressive caucus ==
=== Candidates ===
==== Potential ====
- Emma Mulvaney-Stanak, incumbent mayor (2024–present)

== Democratic caucus ==
=== Candidates ===
==== Declared ====
- Ben Traverse, city council president
