= Dykes to Watch Out For =

Comic strip by American cartoonist Alison Bechdel

- Several characters in Dykes to Watch Out For. From left to right: Mo, Sydney, Ginger, and Samia.
- Author: Alison Bechdel
- Website: dykestowatchoutfor.com
- Current status/schedule: Sporadic updates
- Launch date: 1983
- End date: May 14, 2008
- Genre(s): Lesbian, Women, Adults, Politics

Dykes to Watch Out For (sometimes DTWOF) was a weekly comic strip by Alison Bechdel. The strip, which ran from 1983 to 2008, was one of the earliest ongoing representations of lesbians in popular culture and has been called "as important to new generations of lesbians as landmark novels like Rita Mae Brown's Rubyfruit Jungle (1973) and Lisa Alther's Kinflicks (1976) were to an earlier one". It introduced the Bechdel test, a set of criteria for determining gender bias in works of entertainment, that has since found broad application.

== Overview ==
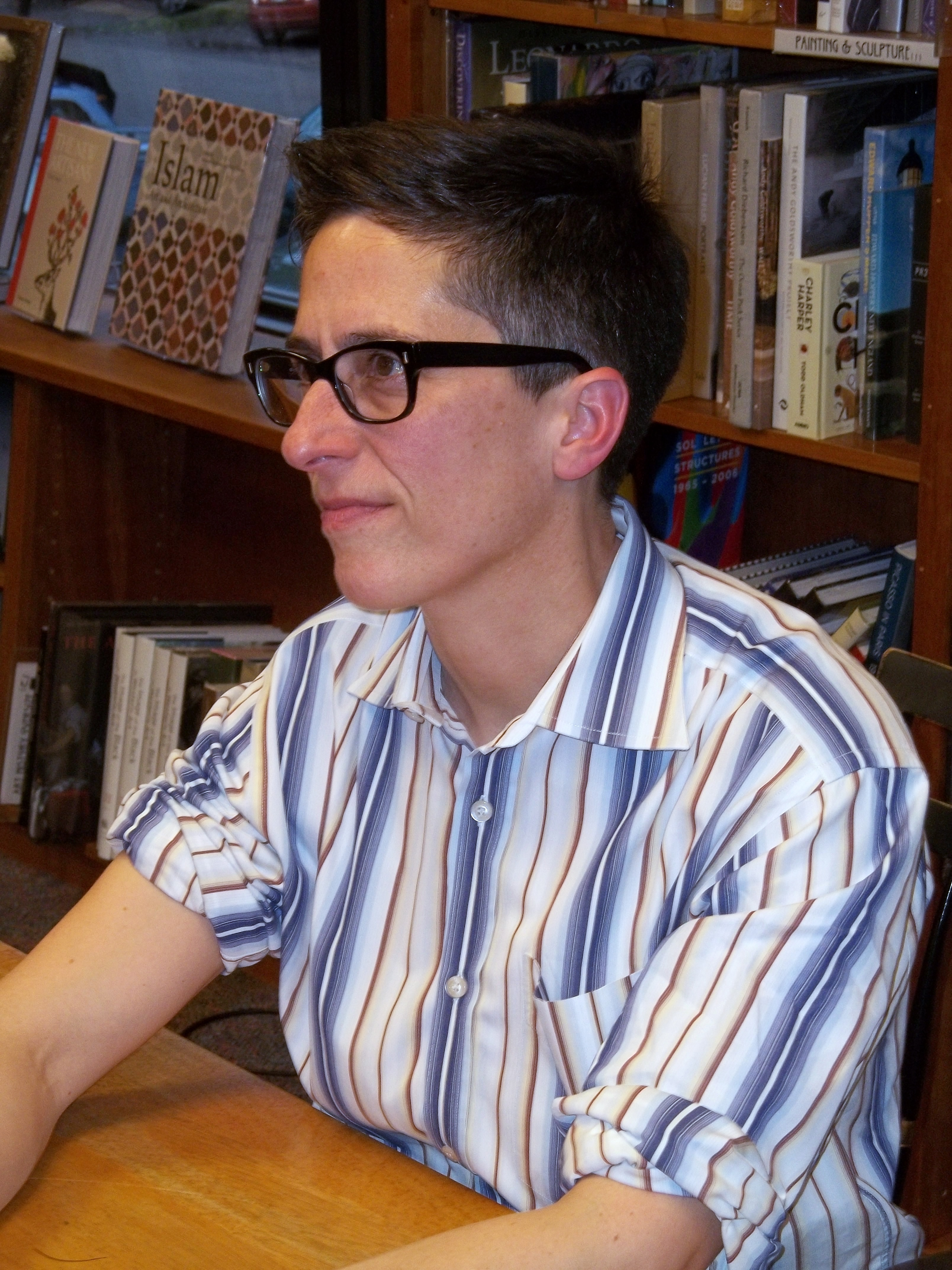
Alison Bechdel, author of Dykes to Watch Out For

DTWOF chronicled the lives, loves, and politics of a fairly diverse group of characters (most of them lesbians) living in a medium-sized city in the United States, featuring both humorous soap opera storylines and biting topical commentary. The strip was carried in Funny Times and syndicated to a number of gay and lesbian newspapers, and also posted on the web. The first illustrated book edition was published by Firebrand Books in 1986.

According to Bechdel, her strip was "half op-ed column and half endless, serialized Victorian novel". Characters reacted to contemporary events, including going to the Michigan Womyn's Festival, Gay Pride parades and protest marches, and having heated discussions about day-to-day events, political issues and the way lesbian culture was changing. The strip was one of the most successful and longest-running queer comic strips.

On May 10, 2008, Bechdel announced that she was putting the strip on indefinite hiatus in order to complete her graphic novel memoir Love Life, which was eventually published in 2012 as Are You My Mother?.

On November 23, 2016, Bechdel broke the strip's hiatus with an episode called “Pièce de Résistance”. The same characters are shown addressing the eight-year gap and responding to the election of Donald Trump. “Pièce de Résistance” was published in Seven Days and on Bechdel's website. The amount of traffic caused the website to crash. Bechdel also drew the cover for the November 23–30, 2016, issue of Seven Days, featuring the Dykes to Watch Out For characters having Thanksgiving dinner. In the strip, the characters reflect on Trump’s presidency and write postcards to the White House for the Ides of the Trump campaign. The Seven Days post states that Bechdel “now draws single strips when inspiration strikes.”. In 2023, forty years after the strip's debut, DTWOF was adapted as a streaming podcast series on Audible by playwright Madeleine George and featured the voices of Carrie Brownstein, Roberta Colindrez, Roxane Gay, Jenn Colella and Jane Lynch, with Bechdel's approval.

== Characters ==
The strip ran for 25 years; the characters aged in real time, and their (unnamed) city changed in ways realistic of many US cities. Many of the characters were connected to the city's feminist bookstore, Madwimmin Books, which faced insuperable commercial pressures when Bounders Books and Muzak (a parody of Borders Books and Music) moved in. Eventually Madwimmin Books closed, and some of its laid-off employees went to work at Bounders. Other characters are connected via working or studying at the university, shared housing or romantic relationships.

The central characters included:

- Mo Testa (given name Monica), the central character, a politically committed lesbian feminist with a tendency to kvetch. She worked at Madwimmin Bookstore, and then briefly at Bounders Books and Muzak while earning a library science degree, finally getting a job as a reference librarian.
- Lois MacGiver, a sex-positive activist, drag king, also a book clerk at both stores. Lois is housemate to Ginger and Sparrow, and dates single mother Jasmine, mother of transgender teenager Janis (originally introduced as Jonas).
- Ginger Jordan, a struggling academic and English professor at Buffalo Lake State University, whose star student Cynthia was interning at the CIA despite coming out to her parents. Longtime housemate of Lois and Sparrow, Ginger eventually bought a house with Samia, a Syrian Muslim chemist in a lavender marriage to a man.
- Sparrow Pidgeon (birth name Prudence), former women's shelter director and New Ager-turned-atheist, who identified herself as a bisexual lesbian (and later just bisexual) and became involved with a straight Jewish male activist, Stuart Goodman (jokingly thought of by the others as being "more stereotypically lesbian than many lesbians"). Sparrow and Stuart have a child, Jiao Raizel (or J.R.), and Stuart becomes a stay-at-home dad; Lois and Stuart homeschooled Janis and J.R.
- Clarice Clifford, a workaholic environmental lawyer and college girlfriend of Mo's.
- Toni Ortiz, a CPA and business manager, who had a child with Clarice; she was a stay-at-home-mom for several years while raising their son Rafael Clifford-Ortiz (or Raffi). Toni and Clarice had a commitment ceremony in the backyard, a civil union in Vermont, and a (not legally recognized by the state) marriage at City Hall. They later explored the phenomenon of divorcing without court involvement. Clarice then moved in with Sparrow, Stuart and Lois, taking the room vacated by Ginger.
- Harriet, a state human rights investigator, Mo's ex-lover, and single mother to daughter Isabel.
- Dr. Sydney Krukowski, an academically involved, materialistic, yuppie Women's Studies professor with a compulsive spending habit, Mo's lover and a breast cancer survivor.
- Jezanna Ramsay (birth name Alberta), owner-manager of Madwimmin Books. After its demise, she taught English as a second language.
- Thea, a Jewish lesbian with multiple sclerosis who was Sydney's lover in college. Thea worked at Madwimmin Books, and afterwards taught art to kids.

Long-term housemates Sparrow and Ginger purchased the house they had shared first with Lois and later with Stuart. When Ginger wanted to move on, the group was able to buy her share by Sparrow taking the Executive Director position at the state NARAL office.

Only some of the characters' surnames were known, since such names appeared only when it was appropriate to the dialogue (when Ginger and Sydney, as college instructors, were addressed as "Professor Jordan" and "Dr. Krukowski", for instance) and were not established from the beginning.

== Books ==
=== Strip collections ===
The strip had a number of strip collections, including:

- Dykes to Watch Out For (1986) (non-serialized comics from 1983-1986)
- More Dykes to Watch Out For (1988) (strips #1-23, plus "Down to the Skin: A Mildly Erotic Epilogue" and a number of non-serialized comics from 1986-1987)
- New, Improved! Dykes to Watch Out For (1990) (strips #24-77)
- Dykes to Watch Out For: The Sequel (1992) (strips #78-126, plus "Serial Monogamy")
- Spawn of Dykes to Watch Out For (1993) (strips #127-170, plus "Flesh & Blood")
- Unnatural Dykes to Watch Out For (1995) (strips #171-221, plus "Sentimental Education")
- Hot, Throbbing Dykes to Watch Out For (1997) (strips #222-263, plus "Sense & Sensibility")
- Split-Level Dykes to Watch Out For (1998) (strips #264-297, plus "Demographic Rift")
- Post-Dykes to Watch Out For (2000) (strips #298-337)
- Dykes and Sundry Other Carbon-Based Life-Forms to Watch Out For (2003) (strips #338-397, plus "Replicants")
- Invasion of the Dykes to Watch Out For (2005) (strips #398-457)
- The Essential Dykes to Watch Out For (2008) (strips #458-527, plus most of the preceding strips and "Cartoonist's Introduction")

The first of these collections contained miscellaneous, individual strips; the serialized story centered around Mo began halfway through the second collection, More Dykes to Watch Out For.

Beginning with the third book Bechdel began including graphic "novellas" at the end of each book. Some were flashbacks, such as the tale of how everyone met in Unnatural Dykes to Watch Out For, or Serial Monogamy, Bechdel's humorous "documentary" on lesbian relationships, but most have advanced the plot in new and interesting ways, such as Raffi's birth at the end of Spawn of Dykes to Watch Out For.

While not a compilation, The Indelible Alison Bechdel: Confessions, Comix, and Miscellaneous Dykes to Watch Out For (1998) included many of the strips Bechdel published in calendars, a timeline of the strip to date, and a fanciful "tour" of the "factory" where Dykes to Watch Out For is produced.

The Essential Dykes to Watch Out For, published in 2008, compiled most but not all of the strips that had ever been published under the title, along with a 12-page introduction in which Bechdel reflected on her time drawing the strip. The book won the Ferro-Grumley Award for LGBT fiction in 2009.

== Literary references ==
As with Bechdel's popular autobiographical novel, Fun Home, DTWOF included many literary allusions. For example, the name chosen for Sydney Krukowski references Stanley Kowalski, a character from A Streetcar Named Desire. Sydney also drinks Loch Lomond, a brand of Scotch whisky famously invented by Hergé in The Adventures of Tintin.

== See also ==
- Hothead Paisan: Homicidal Lesbian Terrorist
- Jane's World
- Wimmen's Comix
- List of feminist comic books
- Portrayal of women in comics
