= Sydney Lucas =

American actress

Sydney Ellen Lucas (born July 11, 2003) is an American actress with credits in musical theatre, film and television. She is best known for her portrayal of Small Alison Bechdel in both the original Off-Broadway and Broadway productions of Lisa Kron and Jeanine Tesori's musical Fun Home; she won an Obie Award and Theater World Award and received nominations for a Drama Desk Award and a Tony Award for Best Featured Actress in a Musical for her performance. She most recently starred in the main cast of AMC's western drama television series The Son as Jeannie McCullough.

== Life and career ==
Born in Atlanta, Georgia, Sydney moved with her parents and two older brothers to New York City when she was two years old. Her parents run a software consulting company. In 2009, at age 6, Lucas underwent heart surgery to treat an atrial septal defect. Her older brother Jake Lucas is also a professional actor, and the two have appeared together in a commercial for Campbell’s Cream of Mushroom soup, and alongside Jennifer Aniston in the movie She's Funny That Way, which was released in 2015. She has studied acting with Diane Hardin and singing with Badiene Magaziner. She has also studied singing with her mother, Karri Lucas, who has a degree in vocal performance from DePauw University. She currently is a student in Manhattan.

In 2014, at the age of 10, Lucas became the youngest individual to win an Obie Award for her portrayal of Small Alison in the original Off-Broadway cast of Lisa Kron and Jeanine Tesori's musical Fun Home. That same year, she was also nominated for a Drama Desk Award, among other prestigious prizes. Lucas continued with the show when it moved to Broadway, winning a Theatre World Award, and receiving a nomination for a Tony Award for Best Featured Actress in a Musical in 2015 at the age of 11. Lucas left the company of Fun Home on October 4, 2015.

Lucas played Mary Lennox in The Secret Garden with Manhattan Concert Productions on February 21 and 22, 2016 at Lincoln Center’s David Geffen Hall.

Lucas has portrayed the younger version of two different characters played by Kristen Wiig in the films Girl Most Likely (2012) and The Skeleton Twins (2014). Her television credits include guest roles on Law & Order: Special Victims Unit, Royal Pains, Saturday Night Live, and Team Umizoomi. She has also appeared as Malcolm's Daughter in Giuseppe Verdi's Macbeth at the Metropolitan Opera in 2012.

== Theatre credits ==
Year	Show	Role	Dates	Theatre
2012	Macbeth	Malcolm's Daughter		Metropolitan Opera
2013–14	Fun Home	Small Alison	September 12, 2013 – January 12, 2014	Public Theater
2015	Fun Home	Small Alison	April 19 – October 4, 2015	Circle in the Square Theatre
2016	The Secret Garden	Mary Lennox	February 21–22, 2016	David Geffen Hall

== Filmography ==
=== Film ===
Year	Title	Role	Notes
2012	Adventures in Lalaloopsy Land: The Search for Pillow	Rosy Bumps 'N' Bruises	Voice; Direct-to-video
2012	Girl Most Likely	Little Imogene	
2013	Fool's Day	Jamie	Short
2014	The Skeleton Twins	Young Maggie	
2014	She's Funny That Way	Josie Albertson	
2015	Broadway Draft 2015	Sideline Reporter	Short
2018	Dude	Olivia	

=== Television ===
Year	Title	Role	Notes
2011	Team Umizoomi	Additional voices	Episode: "Super Soap!"
2012	Sesame Street	Kid	1 episode
2013	Late Show With David Letterman	Screaming Kid	Pakistan Theme Park Segment
2013	Saturday Night Live	Jeremy Renner's daughter	Segment: "The Standoff"
2014	Royal Pains	Larkin	Episode: "A Bridge Not Far Enough"
2014	Law & Order: Special Victims Unit	Ryann Catalano	Episode: "Pattern Seventeen"
2014	How and Why	Kitty	TV Pilot
2014	The Sonnet Project	Actress	Episode: "Sonnet #46"
2015	69th Tony Awards	Performer	TV special
2017–2019	The Son	Jeannie McCullough	Series regular

== Awards and nominations ==
Year	Award	Category	Nominated Work	Result
2014	Lucille Lortel Award	Outstanding Lead Actress in a Musical	Fun Home	Nominated
2014	Outer Critics Circle Award	Outstanding Featured Actress in a Musical	Fun Home	Nominated
2014	Obie Award	Performance	Fun Home	Won
2014	Drama League Award	Distinguished Performance Award	Fun Home	Nominated
2014	Drama Desk Award	Outstanding Featured Actress in a Musical	Fun Home	Nominated
2015	Tony Award	Outstanding Featured Actress in a Musical	Fun Home	Nominated
2015	Broadway.com Audience Choice Award	Favorite Breakthrough Performance (Female)	Fun Home	Nominated
2015	Theatre World Award		Fun Home	Won
2016	Grammy Award	Best Musical Theater Album	Fun Home	Nominated
