= The Mental Load: A Feminist Comic =

2017 comic

Book cover

"The Mental Load: A Feminist Comic" is a comic that went viral in 2017, by Emma, a French cartoonist and computer science engineer. The comic was first released as “Fallait demander”, or "You should've asked", and was later published in book form by Murdoch Books (ISBN 978-1760633646, 2018) and Seven Stories Press (ISBN 978-1609809188, 2018).

== Plot ==
The comic depicts a mother hosting a reception in her home, taking care of her children and logistics while her husband chats with guests. When she explodes in frustration, her husband responds, “You should have asked! I would have helped." The narrative shows how household responsibilities drain women disproportionately compared to men, and then references possible improvements to help balance the mental load, such as prioritizing paternity leave.

== Critical reception ==
The comic received immediate attention in the French press. In 2019, Jessica Grose of the New York Times described concern over the children's health and well-being, combined with managing household schedules, as “'worry work' or, colloquially, the mental load", with a link to the comic. Hillary Chute, in the NYT Book Review, wrote that the comic "creates an intimate flowchart of household routine". BCG began an article on recommendations for family-friendly corporate policies with the comic.

== Author ==
RFI reported that Emma uses only her first name in an effort to "keep her 'work' and 'illustration' selves separate".
