= Jean O'Sullivan =

American politician and member of the Vermont State House of Representatives

Member of the Vermont House of Representatives from the Chittenden 6-2 district
- In office 2012–2021
- Preceded by: Mark Larson
- Succeeded by: Emma Mulvaney-Stanak

Personal details
- Born: New York City, U.S.
- Party: Democratic
- Education: Goddard College; California State University, Los Angeles (BA); The New School

Jean O'Sullivan is an American politician who served in the Vermont House of Representatives from 2012 to 2021.

== Early life and education ==
Jean O'Sullivan was born in New York City, and was raised in Greenwich, Connecticut. She graduated with a degree in political science from California State College at Los Angeles, and the New School for Social Research. She spent three years at Goddard College in Plainfield, Vermont, which gave her a love of the state. In 1977, she moved to Vermont, where she owned a discount beverage store and a small chain of candy stores.

== Career ==
O'Sullivan was the ward, city, and county Democratic Chair from 1985 to 1990. She elected to the Burlington City Council from 2000 to 2005.

She was appointed to the Vermont House of Representatives in 2012. She served as Vice Chair of the Commerce, Economic and Workforce Development Committee. She also served on the General, Housing and Military Affairs Committee.

O'Sullivan lost the Chittenden-6-2 Democratic primary to Emma Mulvaney-Stanak in 2020.
