= Stephen Moorer =

American theater actor, director, and producer (born 1961)

- Stephen Moorer as the title role in Shakespeare's Coriolanus, 1997
- Born: September 29, 1961 (age 64); Santa Monica, California, United States
- Awards: Best Ensemble, Best Musical for Buddy: The Buddy Holly Story

Stephen Moorer (born September 29, 1961) is an American stage actor, director, and producer based on the Central California Coast. He founded the GroveMont Theatre in 1982, renaming the non-profit organization Pacific Repertory Theatre in 1994, when the group acquired the Golden Bough Playhouse in Carmel-by-the-Sea, California.

== Early life and education ==
Moorer was born in Santa Monica, California. When he was 11 years old, his family moved to the Monterey Peninsula. His mother, a community theatre actress acted in amateur performances in the San Fernando Valley, and Moorer began first performing in community theatre. His first principal role was Miles in The Innocents (based on The Turn of the Screw), with a local community theater group. Moorer attended the Carmel-by-the-Sea, California, middle and high schools, becoming involved in the drama program, acting in and producing shows. From the age of 11 to 17, Moorer also studied theatre at Carmel's Children's Experimental Theatre.

After graduating from high school in 1979, Moorer appeared in a three-show repertory season at Hartnell Summer Theatre (which was later called the Western Stage). He returned to the Children's Experimental Theatre in 1980 for a paid internship. In 1982, he trained in a 16-week summer season at the American Conservatory Theater in San Francisco.

== Actor ==
At the Forest Theater, for the Carmel Shake-speare Festival, he played Richmond in Richard III (1993), the title role in Coriolanus (1997), and Oberon in A Midsummer Night's Dream (2000). In 2002, he returned to PacRep, where he revisited the title role in The Elephant Man (2002, opposite Barbara Babcock). Of this performance, one reviewer wrote, "Moorer reprises his 1988 role ... with skill and dignity. Working with no makeup or prosthesis to simulate Merrick's appearance, Moorer twists his face into a grotesque mask from which a high-pitched, rasping, wheezing voice emerges. From a physical aspect alone, Moorer's performance is skilled and noteworthy. Moorer also delivers a well-executed emotional performance that highlights Merrick's artistic sensitivity and droll sense of humor." He next played Jason in Medea (2003) (directed by Joseph Chaikin). Moorer performed as Ned in Elizabeth Rex and Edward de Vere in The Beard of Avon (2005).

In 2012, he appeared as Marc Antony in Shakespeare's Julius Caesar, in 2014, he portrayed Pontius Pilate in Jesus Christ Superstar, and in 2017 he played the title role in Cyrano at the Forest Theater.

== Director ==
Moorer has directed over a hundred productions, including his Shakespeare "Royal Blood" series.

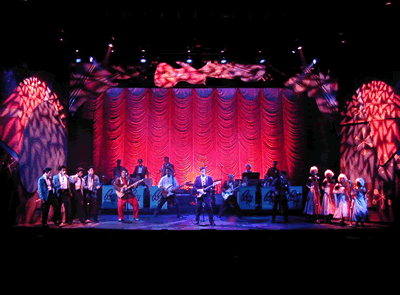
Buddy: The Buddy Holly Story, San Francisco, directed by Stephen Moorer

In 2003, Moorer produced and directed a production of Buddy: The Buddy Holly Story. This production, starring Travis Poelle, opened at the Golden Bough Playhouse in Carmel and moved to San Jose, playing at the San Jose Stage. The production was revived in 2004 at the Post St. Theatre in San Francisco, garnering positive reviews and Bay Area Critics' awards for Best Musical, Best Ensemble, and Best Actor in a Musical (Poelle). Buddy Holly's widow, Maria Elena Holly, attended the show at each location, dancing onstage with the cast at curtain call. The production returned to Carmel for several runs, most recently in 2008.

In 2004 Moorer was the recipient of the "Award of Artistic Excellence for Distinguished Achievements in the Advancement of Shakespearean Drama" at the eighth annual Edward de Vere Studies Conference at Concordia University. In 2009, Moorer directed Laughter on the 23rd Floor for Pacific Repertory Theatre.

In 2018 and 2019: Fun Home at the Golden Bough and Beauty and the Beast at the Forest. Following the suspension of live performances due to the COVID-19 pandemic, Moorer reopened the Forest Theater in August 2021 by producing and directing a revival of Shrek the Musical.

== Producer ==
By 2006, he had produced over 350 shows. He founded GroveMont Theatre, now Pacific Repertory Theatre, in 1982, acting as Artistic Director, and based the company in the Monterey Playhouse.

In 1990, Moorer founded the Carmel Shakespeare Festival, an annual summer festival presenting Shakespeare, musicals, children's plays and other classic works of English-language drama. Moorer also founded the Monterey Bay TheatreFest In 1993, Moorer spearheaded the campaign to save the Golden Bough Playhouse, and he has since directed its ongoing development and renovation.

In 2008, the Board of Directors of Pacific Repertory Theatre named Moorer as executive director. In 2024, after further renovations, the Golden Bough reopened.
