= MetaMaus =

2011 book by Art Spiegelman

- First edition
- Author: Art Spiegelman; Hillary Chute
- Language: English
- Genre: Non-fiction
- Publisher: Random House; Pantheon Books
- Publication date: 2011

MetaMaus: A Look Inside a Modern Classic, Maus is a book by Art Spiegelman, published by Random House/Pantheon Books in 2011. The centerpiece of the book is an interview with Art Spiegelman, the author of Maus, conducted by Hillary Chute. It also has interviews with his wife and children, sketches, photographs, family trees, assorted artwork, and a DVD with video, audio, photos, and an interactive version of Maus. It also has documents such as the letters of rejection Spiegelman received from major publishers before Pantheon gave him a contract.

MetaMaus won a 2011 National Jewish Book Award in the category Biography, Autobiography, Memoir, a 2012 Eisner Award in the category best comics-related book, and an honorable mention in the 2012 Sophie Brody Award.

== Synopsis ==
MetaMaus: A Look Inside a Modern Classic, Maus details an interview between Hillary Chute and Art Spiegelman, where the two cover everything that went into Spiegelman's biography, Maus: A Survivor’s Tale. MetaMaus is a companion text to Maus as it serves to answer questions that readers had after reading. As the associate editor of MetaMaus, Hillary Chute formulated questions that helped to guide Spiegelman's reflection on the process of creating Maus, the issues that arose, and responses to the work. The text is written in a question and answer format, with Spiegelman's sketches, references, family pictures, letters, and published works scattered throughout. Additionally, there are interviews Chute conducted with Spiegelman's family, including his wife, Françoise Mouly, his daughter, Nadja, and son, Dash.

The project started due to Chute's multiple works that mentioned or focused on Maus while she was a graduate student in literature at Rutgers University. As their relationship progressed, Spiegelman offered for her to work with him in order to create MetaMaus. In a separate interview between Spiegelman and Chute at 92NY, Spiegelman offered that the reason he allowed Chute “into his life” was because “she knew how to look at things … so she was able to see a lot of things that were embedded visually in Maus” that others missed. In 2005, Chute officially signed onto the project and worked with Spiegelman for the next six years.

The main portion of the book, based on interviews between Chute and Art Spiegelman, took place over two years. It was then edited from 1,000 pages of transcripts to 250 by Chute in order to reach the format that would become MetaMaus. Chute stated that Spiegelman never knew any of the questions in advance, and the two treated the interview as a conversation, often lasting hours at a time.

In those conversations, Chute led with broader questions such as, “How did you come across the idea of mice?” and then slowly asks more pointed questions, such as “You show mice with their mouths open so few times in the book. Was that deliberate?” Chute guides Spiegelman in order to get to the bottom of many questions, while also allowing the conversation to flow smoothly, and even get off topic at times. Through this process, Chute's own academic voice and narrative shows within the book.

One of the last sections of MetaMaus includes the whole transcripts of Art's interviews with Vladek Spiegelman. This is part of the archival nature of MetaMaus, as it is a way to remember what materials were used to construct Maus. Also included in MetaMaus are shorter interviews with Art Spiegelman's wife and children and Hillary Chute that analyze the relationship each of them had to Maus and its creation.

Many of the sketches and photos used to create Maus are included throughout MetaMaus. Every page includes at least one visual reference intended to help readers conceptualize what Chute and Spiegelman were talking about at that moment in the interview. There are also pages that depict Spiegelman's whole working process and finding the right drawing style.

The use of archival materials is a main theme of MetaMaus. Chute explained in an interview that MetaMaus and its chosen format illustrate the relationship between the words and images that make up comics. In regard to MetaMaus itself, Chute noted the “tension between the oral, written, and visual” aspects of the story due to the format of the book. The combination of these three types of storytelling shape the book's presentation as a historical narrative and visual representation of Maus.

== Reception ==
Reviewing for the New York Times, Dan Kois describes MetaMaus with its accompanying DVD as “exhaustive,” which he attributes to the close scrutiny and criticism Maus had been subject to over the years. Kois notes that MetaMaus offers many important background details, including a Spiegelman-Zylberberg family tree before and after the Holocaust. He calls the book a “master class on the making and reading of comics.”

David Berry, writing for the Canadian National Post, says that it is the “spirit of the author that makes a book.” He views MetaMaus as a discussion of Maus that delves deeper into the background research and creation of Maus, as well as expanding on the themes found within it.

While Kois understands why MetaMaus is so comprehensive, Dwight Garner, writing in the same issue of the New York Times, considers the book to be “overly long.” Garner focuses more on Maus than on its encompassing meta-follow-up.

Andrés Romero-Jódar, in his 2019 scholarly examination of five recent graphic novels about traumatic events, notes that MetaMaus “goes beyond” mere interview transcription, offering instead “an Encyclopedia of the elements that make up the Maus constellation.” This encapsulates MetaMaus’s ability to catalog almost every drawing, interview, and reference that went into the creation of Maus: A Survivor’s Tale.
