= Fun Home (musical) =

Musical adapted by Lisa Kron and Jeanine Tesori

- Original Broadway Poster
- Music: Jeanine Tesori
- Lyrics: Lisa Kron
- Book: Lisa Kron
- Basis: Fun Home by Alison Bechdel
- Productions: 2013 Off-Broadway; 2015 Broadway; 2016 US National Tour; 2018 Off-West End
- Awards: Tony Award for Best Musical; Tony Award for Best Book of a Musical; Tony Award for Best Original Score

Fun Home is a musical theatre adaptation of Alison Bechdel's 2006 graphic memoir of the same name, with music by Jeanine Tesori, and book and lyrics by Lisa Kron. The story concerns Bechdel's discovery of her own lesbian sexuality, her relationship with her closeted gay father, and her attempts to unlock the mysteries surrounding his life. It is told in a series of non-linear vignettes connected by narration provided by the adult Alison character.

The musical was developed through several readings and performances, including at the Ojai Playwrights Conference in 2009 and at the Sundance Theatre Lab and The Public Theater's Public Lab in 2012. It opened Off-Broadway at the Public Theater in September 2013 to positive reviews. Its run was extended several times, until January 2014. The Public Theater production of Fun Home was nominated for nine Lucille Lortel Awards (winning three, including Outstanding Musical), two Obie Awards and eight Drama Desk Awards, among others. The musical was a finalist for the 2014 Pulitzer Prize for Drama.

The original Broadway production began previews at the Circle in the Square Theatre in March 2015 and opened in April 2015. It was nominated for twelve Tony Awards, winning five, including Best Musical, and its cast album received a nomination for the 2016 Grammy Award for Best Musical Theater Album. The production closed on September 10, 2016. A US national tour and foreign productions followed.

A film adaptation is reportedly in the works at Amazon MGM Studios, with Jake Gyllenhaal as a producer.

== Background and development ==
Writer/artist Alison Bechdel's book Fun Home, a memoir in graphic novel format, was published in 2006 to critical acclaim. Its subject is Alison Bechdel's coming of age, with particular emphasis on her relationship to her father, Bruce. Bechdel's coming out as a lesbian is complicated by the revelation that Bruce was a closeted homosexual whose extra-marital affairs included underage males. Four months after Bechdel comes out to her parents, Bruce is killed by an oncoming truck; although the evidence is equivocal, Bechdel concludes that he committed suicide.

Bechdel's book was adapted into a musical with book and lyrics by Lisa Kron and music by Jeanine Tesori. Writing in Slate, June Thomas called it "the first mainstream musical about a young lesbian". The adaptation was developed over the course of five years. It was first workshopped at the Ojai Playwrights Conference in August 2009. A staged reading was performed at The Public Theater in 2011. (Of the cast of that staged reading, only Judy Kuhn and Beth Malone continued in their roles to the full Off-Broadway production.) The musical had another workshop as part of the Sundance Institute's Theater Lab in July 2012, featuring Raul Esparza. Following that it ran for three weeks as part of the Public Theater's Public Lab series in October and November 2012. On April 8, 2013, musical selections from the show were performed by Maggie Gyllenhaal, Judy Kuhn, David Hyde Pierce and others at an event for the Sundance Institute. A final Public Theater workshop was held in May 2013.

The musical's development process entailed extensive changes and rewrites. Beth Malone said that the original workshop script "doesn't resemble this current play at all". In early versions, the production was structured around Bechdel's drawings, but the creators later removed most of this element, save for one image of Bruce and young Alison which is used at the musical's conclusion. Revisions continued through the preview period of the Off-Broadway production, requiring the actors to perform new material every night. Bechdel did not participate in the musical's creation. She expected her story to seem artificial and distant on stage, but she came to feel that the musical had the opposite effect, bringing the "emotional heart" of the story closer than even her book did. Fun Home is one of the few Broadway musicals to feature a lesbian main character; Playbill magazine stated that the role of Alison Bechdel is "by far, the most groundbreaking lesbian character in a Broadway musical".

== Plot summary ==
As she works on her memoir in the present day, successful middle-aged cartoonist Alison Bechdel (Alison) recalls two time periods in her life. The first is her childhood, around age 10 (Small Alison), when she struggles against her father Bruce's obsessive demands and begins to identify her inchoate sexuality. The second is her first year in college (Medium Alison), when she begins her first relationship and comes out of the closet as a lesbian.

Alison remembers herself, as a child, demanding that her father Bruce play "airplane" with her, while he sorts through a box of junk and valuables he has salvaged from a barn ("It All Comes Back"). Bruce tells the family that a visitor from the local historical society is coming to see their ornate Victorian home that he has restored, and his wife Helen prepares the house to Bruce's demanding aesthetic standard ("Welcome to Our House on Maple Avenue"). In a phone call with her father and a journal entry, Medium Alison expresses her anxiety about starting college ("Not Too Bad"). At the Bechdel Funeral Home, Small Alison and her brothers John and Christian perform an imaginary advertisement for the funeral home ("Come to the Fun Home"). Medium Alison hesitates outside the door of the college's Gay Union, and is flummoxed when she meets Joan, a confident young lesbian. Bruce invites Roy, a young man whom he has hired to do yard work, into the house. Bruce begins to seduce Roy in the library while Helen is playing the piano upstairs, trying her best to ignore it ("Helen's Etude").

Medium Alison writes a letter to her parents about college life but does not mention Joan or her recent realization that she is a lesbian ("Thanks for the Care Package"). Bruce orders Small Alison to put on a dress, but she would rather wear jeans. Bruce tells her that the other children would laugh at her; she reluctantly obeys him ("Party Dress"). Medium Alison proudly tells Joan that she has written a letter to her parents telling them that she is a lesbian, but begins to second-guess herself until Joan kisses her. That night, she is delirious with joy after having had sex with Joan and finally discovering her sexuality ("Changing My Major").

Alison considers the connection between her coming out and her father's death. Small Alison has a homework assignment to draw a map of places her family has been to, but Bruce aggressively takes over, drawing it the way he thinks it should look. Alison realizes that despite having traveled widely, her father's place of birth, life, work and death can all be placed in a small circle in Beech Creek, Pennsylvania ("Maps"). Bruce offers a ride and a beer to an underage boy, and it is later implied that they had a sexual encounter. Medium Alison writes to her parents, asking for a response to her coming-out letter. Small Alison watches The Partridge Family, but Bruce angrily switches it off. Small Alison talks to him and finds out that he is going to see a psychiatrist, but he is ambiguous about the reason. Alison expresses annoyance that he lied to her; the reason he was going was because he was arrested for what he did to the underage boy. Helen attempts to reassure Small Alison that the psychiatrist will help her father, but she too refuses to elaborate. Bruce starts a vicious argument with Helen and breaks several of her possessions along with some library books. Small Alison fantasizes about her family as the happy family singing together on television ("Raincoat of Love").

Alison remembers a time when Bruce took her and her brothers on a trip to New York City. After a long day, Small Alison, Christian and John settle into sleeping bags. Small Alison wakes up and catches Bruce sneaking out. Bruce sings her a lullaby ("Pony Girl"). He reassures his daughter that he is just going out for a paper, but Alison realizes he was probably going cruising. Medium Alison is angered by a noncommittal letter from Bruce responding to her coming out. At a luncheonette with her father, Small Alison notices a butch delivery woman and feels an inexplicable kinship with her ("Ring of Keys").

Medium Alison calls home to demand a better response from her parents and is astonished when her mother reveals that her father has had sexual relationships with men and boys. Alison explores the tensions her family was under at this time and watches a heated argument between her parents. Medium Alison returns home for vacation with Joan. Helen confesses to Medium Alison her troubled and turbulent life with Bruce ("Days and Days"). Medium Alison, Joan and Bruce have an unexpectedly pleasant evening around the piano. Bruce asks Alison if she'd like to go for a drive, and (adult) Alison realizes that Medium Alison is gone; she joins her father in the car, breaking the boundaries of time. On the drive, she and Bruce struggle to express themselves to each other ("Telephone Wire").

Bruce, maniacally engaged in a new restoration project, tries and fails to find a way to hold his life together. He steps in front of a truck and is killed ("Edges of the World"). Alison, newly reconciled to her past, remembers and draws a moment of perfect balance: playing "airplane" with her father, while reminiscing about the past with the other Alisons ("Flying Away").

== Original off-Broadway and Broadway production ==
Fun Home premiered Off-Broadway at The Public Theater in previews on September 30, 2013, and opened officially on October 22, 2013. Originally scheduled to run through November 3, 2013, the run was extended several times, and the musical closed on January 12, 2014. The production was directed by Sam Gold, with sets and costumes by David Zinn, lighting by Ben Stanton, projections by Jim Findlay and Jeff Sugg, and choreography by Danny Mefford. In response to a controversy in which the legislature of South Carolina attempted to financially punish the College of Charleston for choosing the original graphic novel of Fun Home as a reading selection for incoming freshmen, the off-Broadway cast presented a concert of songs from the musical to a full house in Charleston, South Carolina, in April 2014. Bechdel, Kron, Tesori and musical director Chris Fenwick accompanied the cast.

The musical began previews at Broadway's Circle in the Square Theatre on March 27, 2015, with an official opening on April 19, 2015. Gold directed the show on Broadway, with the same production team as the Off-Broadway production, including Zinn, Mefford and Stanton. The Off-Broadway cast reprised their roles on Broadway, except for the actors playing Medium Alison, John and Christian Bechdel. In December 2015, eight months after opening on Broadway, the show recouped its capitalization and began to make a profit. Costs for the show were relatively low due to a small cast and orchestra. The production closed on September 10, 2016, after 26 previews and 582 regular performances.

A year-long U.S. national tour of the show began in Cleveland, Ohio, in October 2016. The tour was directed by Sam Gold and starred Kate Shindle as Alison and Robert Petkoff as Bruce.

== Subsequent productions ==
The first international production of Fun Home played at the RCBC Plaza in Makati, Manila, Philippines, in November 2016, with Cris Villonco as Alison, Lea Salonga as Helen and Eric Kunze as Bruce. It was directed by Bobby Garcia. The run of 18 performances closed on November 27, 2016. A review in ABS-CBN News praised the performances and direction and called the production "undeniably moving, piercing through our core, and performed by an incredibly talented ensemble."

The first U.S. regional production opened in August 2017 at Millbrook Playhouse in Clinton County, Pennsylvania, Bechdel's childhood home and where Fun Home takes place; it was directed and choreographed by Courtney Laine Self. Vermont Stage Company produced the musical in Burlington, Vermont, where Bechdel wrote the graphic memoir; it ran for 29 performances in October 2017.

Singapore's Pangdemonium theatre company staged Fun Home in September and October 2017 at the Drama Centre Theatre, with a cast that included Adrian Pang and Monique Wilson. A production in Carmel, California, by Pacific Repertory Theatre at the Golden Bough Playhouse, directed by Stephen Moorer and choreographed by Sam Trevino, played in February 2018. A Canadian production played in February and March 2018 at the Arts Club in Vancouver.

The musical made its London debut at the Off West End Young Vic theatre, with Gold again directing. It starred Kaisa Hammarlund as Alison, Zubin Varla as Bruce and Jenna Russell as Helen and ran from June to September 2018. A Catalan language version directed by Daniel Anglès ran at the Teatre Condal in Barcelona from September to November 2018.

An Australian co-production of the Melbourne Theatre Company and Sydney Theatre Company, directed by Dean Bryant and choreographed by Andrew Hallsworth, featured Lucy Maunder as adult Alison, Adam Murphy as Bruce and Marina Prior as Helen. It played at the Roslyn Packer Theatre in Sydney in 2021 and at the Arts Centre in Melbourne in 2022 after delays due to the COVID-19 pandemic. The first German-language production began on April 14, 2023, at Landestheater Linz, Austria.

A production ran at the Gate Theatre in Dublin, Ireland, in July and August 2023. It starred Frances McNamee as adult Alison, Killian Donnelly as Bruce and Nichola MacEvilly as Helen. To mark the memoir's 20th anniversary, a revival directed by Sarah Frankcom ran at the Royal Exchange Theatre in Manchester in July and August 2026. Starring Jodie McNee as adult Alison, Nigel Harman as Bruce, and Alex Young as Helen, it was the first UK regional production.

== Characters and original casts ==
The character of Alison Bechdel is portrayed by three actors. 43-year-old "Alison" is the play's narrator who reviews her family and early life, 19-year-old "Medium Alison" who is an Oberlin student discovering her sexuality, and 10-year-old "Small Alison" who is a child struggling against her father's expectations.

Character	Off-Broadway	Broadway	U.S. National Tour	Off-West End
Character	2013	2015	2016	2018
Alison Bechdel	Beth Malone	Beth Malone	Kate Shindle	Kaisa Hammarlund
Bruce Bechdel	Michael Cerveris	Michael Cerveris	Robert Petkoff	Zubin Varla
Helen Bechdel	Judy Kuhn	Judy Kuhn	Susan Moniz	Jenna Russell
Small Alison	Sydney Lucas	Sydney Lucas	Alessandra Baldacchino	Brooke Haynes Harriet Turnbull
Medium Alison	Alexandra Socha	Emily Skeggs	Abby Corrigan	Eleanor Kane
Christian Bechdel	Griffin Birney	Oscar Williams	Pierson Salvador	Charlie McLellan Archie Smith
John Bechdel	Noah Hinsdale	Zell Morrow	Lennon Nate Hammond	Eddie Martin Ramsay Robertson
Joan	Roberta Colindrez	Roberta Colindrez	Karen Eilbacher	Cherrelle Skeete
Roy/Mark/Pete/Bobby Jeremy	Joel Perez	Joel Perez	Robert Hager	Ashley Samuels

Notes

- In November 2013, Socha was replaced as Medium Alison by her understudy, Skeggs. In October 2015, Lucas was replaced as Small Alison by her understudy, Gabriella Pizzolo.
- Standby Lauren Patten played the role of Medium Alison from February 2 to May 22, 2016, while Skeggs was shooting a TV project. Skeggs returned to the role on May 24.
- Williams departed the Broadway company on March 27, 2016, and was replaced by Cole Grey as Christian.
- Rebecca Luker played the role of Helen from April 5 through May 22, 2016, while Kuhn underwent hip surgery. Kuhn returned to the role on May 24.

== Songs and recordings ==
Since the songs in Fun Home are closely integrated into the script, no list of songs was provided in the program.

The original cast album, released in 2014, opened at #2 on the Billboard Top Cast Album Chart, a remarkable feat for an Off-Broadway cast album. After the musical opened on Broadway in 2015, new portions of the show were recorded, and parts were re-recorded, especially to feature Emily Skeggs in the role of Medium Alison. It also includes more dialogue to help the listener follow the story. The song "Party Dress" was added for Small Alison in place of "Al for Short", as the latter has been removed from the Broadway show. A dialogue scene, "Clueless in New York", replaced "I need more coffee". Bruce's short a capella bedtime song, "Pony Girl" was added, as was the scene "A flair for the dramatic...". The album was released in May 2015.

The track list of the 2015 release, which reflects the musical numbers in the Broadway production, is as follows:

1. "It All Comes Back (Opening)" – Small Alison, Bruce, Alison & Company
2. "Sometimes my father appeared to enjoy having children..." – Alison, Bruce & Helen
3. "Welcome to Our House on Maple Avenue" – Helen, Alison, Small Alison, Christian, John, Bruce & Roy
4. "Not Too Bad" – Medium Alison
5. "Just had a good talk with Dad..." – Alison, Medium Alison, Bruce, Pete, Small Alison, John & Christian
6. "Come to the Fun Home" – John, Christian & Small Alison
7. "Helen’s Etude" – Alison, Roy, Bruce, Small Alison, Helen, John, Christian & Medium Alison
8. "Thanks for the care package..." – Medium Alison, Joan, Small Alison & Bruce
9. "Party Dress" – Small Alison, Bruce, Medium Alison, Alison
10. "Changing My Major" – Medium Alison
11. "I leapt out of the closet..." – Alison, Small Alison, Bruce & Helen
12. "Maps" – Alison
13. "Read a book..." – Bruce, Small Alison, Alison & Helen
14. "Raincoat of Love" – Bobby Jeremy & Company
15. "Clueless in New York…" – Alison, Small Alison & Bruce
16. "Pony Girl" – Bruce
17. "A flair for the dramatic…" – Alison, Joan, Medium Alison & Bruce
18. "Ring of Keys" – Small Alison & Alison
19. "Let me introduce you to my gay dad..." – Joan, Medium Alison, Alison, Bruce & Small Alison
20. "Shortly after we were married..." – Helen & Medium Alison
21. "Days and Days" – Helen
22. "You ready to go for that drive?..." – Bruce & Alison
23. "Telephone Wire" – Alison & Bruce
24. "It was great to have you home..." – Bruce & Alison
25. "Edges of the World" – Bruce
26. "This is what I have of you..." – Alison
27. "Flying Away (Finale)" – Alison, Medium Alison & Small Alison

== Critical reception ==
The Off-Broadway production opened on October 22, 2013, to positive reviews. Ben Brantley of The New York Times spoke of the musical's emotional impact, artistry and universality, calling it a "beautiful heartbreaker of a musical". "Fun Home isn’t just a coming out story or a coming-of-age story. Its universality comes from its awareness of how we never fully know even those closest to us, and of the undercurrent of grown-up secrets, intuited by children, that exists to some degree in every family. Fun Home finds a shining clarity that lights up the night." Brantley praised both writer Kron and composer Tesori for their work. Of Kron he says: "her book and resonantly precise lyrics give this show its essential spine", and of Tesori's score "her best and most varied score to date... [which] captures [the story's] haunting ambiguity." Brantley later listed Fun Home as one of his top 15 shows of 2013.

Joe Dziemianowicz of the New York Daily News called the musical "achingly beautiful" and said that it "speaks to one family and all families torn by secrets and lies". Dziemianowicz listed Fun Home at the top of his Top 10 in Theater for 2013 list. Charles McNulty of the Los Angeles Times, though mildly critical of a few of the show's elements still was impressed with Fun Home, saying "There have been plenty of new American musicals better put together than Fun Home, but I can't think of one in recent years that has touched me as much with its tender, ironic and courageous vulnerability." He states that the show's seeming weaknesses are part of the reason it succeeds, saying that it "gets off to a choppy start, takes unnecessary musical detours and is staged in a rough-hewn style that sometimes seems more accidental than intentional" but that it "succeeds not despite these flaws but in large measure because of them. Bechdel's ironically self-aware and inwardly searching sensibility is honored by a musical that isn't afraid to reveal its awkward side." Though less positive than Brantley, Dziemianowicz or McNulty, Miriam Krule of Slate still said "there are also moments of pure joy, and the musical shines during these". Krule felt, however, that "it's not clear that a musical is the best second format for the material". Adam Hetrick, editor-in-chief of Playbill.com, described Fun Home as "the best musical of the year", calling it "an emotionally-packed piece of theatre, full of joy, heart, sorrow and uncomfortable reality".

New York Times music critic Anthony Tommasini praised Tesori's score as a "masterpiece", noting that the "vibrant pastiche songs" and "varied kinds of music... a jazzy number for the young Alison in the middle of a rescue fantasy; Sondheim-influenced songs that unfold over insistent rhythmic figures and shifting, rich harmonies" come together to create "an impressively integrated entity". Tommasini also praised the show's ensemble numbers, calling them "complex yet texturally transparent, engrossingly dramatic". Reviewing the cast album for Playbill, Steven Suskin praised Kron's "marvelous set" of lyrics, called Tesori "a master of musical styles... [who] matches Kron's tone with a mix of sensitivity and humor." Suskin singled out "Days and Days" for especial praise, calling it "a staggering piece of musical theatre writing". He also lauded the performances of Judy Kuhn ("stunning"), Michael Cerveris ("one of his finest performances ever") and the three Alisons, Beth Malone, Alexandra Socha and Sydney Lucas (calling the last "one of the most assured child actors we've seen"). Suskin called Fun Home "the best musical on the New York stage of 2013 — far outclassing the competition — and ... thus far the best musical of the 2013-14 season."

Anticipating the play's move to Broadway, David Levesley of online magazine Mic heralded Fun Home's focus on the individual experience of a lesbian, calling it "the most daring, relentless analysis of homosexual identity on the New York stage right now". Kalle Oskari Mattila, in The Atlantic, however, argued that although the musical presents the novel's themes clearly, its Broadway marketing campaign "obfuscates rather than clarifies" the queer narrative of the original novel.

== Awards and nominations ==
The Public Theater production of Fun Home was nominated for the 2014 Edward M. Kennedy Prize for Drama Inspired by American History, nine Lucille Lortel Awards (winning three, including Outstanding Musical), seven Outer Critics Circle Awards (winning Outstanding New Off-Broadway Musical), three Drama League Awards and eight Drama Desk Awards, and it won the Off Broadway Alliance Award for Best New Musical. Many critics predicted that Fun Home would win the 2014 Pulitzer Prize for Drama. The musical was a finalist for the Pulitzer, but The Flick by Annie Baker won the award. The Pulitzer committee called the musical "A poignant musical adaptation of a graphic memoir". The production won the New York Drama Critics' Circle Award for Best Musical and the Obie Award for Musical Theater, and 10-year-old Sydney Lucas won an Obie in the Performance category, becoming the youngest performer ever to win an Obie.

The original Broadway production was nominated for 12 Tony Awards, winning five, including Best Musical. Jeanine Tesori & Lisa Kron were the first female writing team to win the Tony Award for Best Original Score. Kron won for Best Book, Cerveris won for Best Leading Actor, and Gold won for Best Direction. Both Lucas and Skeggs won Theatre World Awards.

=== Original Off-Broadway production ===
Year	Award	Category	Nominee	Result
2014	Edward M. Kennedy Prize for Drama Inspired by American History			Nominated
2014	Lucille Lortel Awards	Outstanding Musical		Won
2014	Lucille Lortel Awards	Outstanding Director	Sam Gold	Nominated
2014	Lucille Lortel Awards	Outstanding Choreographer	Danny Mefford	Nominated
2014	Lucille Lortel Awards	Outstanding Lead Actor in a Musical	Michael Cerveris	Won
2014	Lucille Lortel Awards	Outstanding Lead Actress in a Musical	Sydney Lucas	Nominated
2014	Lucille Lortel Awards	Outstanding Lead Actress in a Musical	Alexandra Socha	Nominated
2014	Lucille Lortel Awards	Outstanding Featured Actor in a Musical	Noah Hinsdale	Nominated
2014	Lucille Lortel Awards	Outstanding Featured Actress in a Musical	Judy Kuhn	Won
2014	Lucille Lortel Awards	Outstanding Lighting Design	Ben Stanton	Nominated
2014	Pulitzer Prize for Drama			Finalist
2014	New York Drama Critics' Circle Award	Best Musical	Jeanine Tesori and Lisa Kron	Won
2014	Outer Critics Circle Award	Outstanding New Off-Broadway Musical		Won
2014	Outer Critics Circle Award	Outstanding Book of a Musical		Nominated
2014	Outer Critics Circle Award	Outstanding New Score		Nominated
2014	Outer Critics Circle Award	Outstanding Director of a Musical	Sam Gold	Nominated
2014	Outer Critics Circle Award	Outstanding Actor in a Musical	Michael Cerveris	Nominated
2014	Outer Critics Circle Award	Outstanding Featured Actress in a Musical	Judy Kuhn	Nominated
2014	Outer Critics Circle Award	Outstanding Featured Actress in a Musical	Sydney Lucas	Nominated
2014	Obie Award	Musical Theater	Lisa Kron; Jeanine Tesori; Sam Gold	Won
2014	Obie Award	Performance	Sydney Lucas	Won
2014	Drama Desk Award	Outstanding Musical		Nominated
2014	Drama Desk Award	Outstanding Featured Actress in a Musical	Sydney Lucas	Nominated
2014	Drama Desk Award	Outstanding Director of a Musical	Sam Gold	Nominated
2014	Drama Desk Award	Outstanding Music	Jeanine Tesori	Nominated
2014	Drama Desk Award	Outstanding Lyrics	Lisa Kron	Nominated
2014	Drama Desk Award	Outstanding Book of a Musical	Lisa Kron	Nominated
2014	Drama Desk Award	Outstanding Orchestrations	John Clancy	Nominated
2014	Drama Desk Award	Outstanding Sound Design	Kai Harada	Nominated

=== Original Broadway production ===
Year	Award	Category	Nominee	Result
2015	Tony Awards	Best Musical		Won
2015	Tony Awards	Best Book of a Musical	Lisa Kron	Won
2015	Tony Awards	Best Original Score	Jeanine Tesori and Lisa Kron	Won
2015	Tony Awards	Best Leading Actor in a Musical	Michael Cerveris	Won
2015	Tony Awards	Best Leading Actress in a Musical	Beth Malone	Nominated
2015	Tony Awards	Best Featured Actress in a Musical	Judy Kuhn	Nominated
2015	Tony Awards	Best Featured Actress in a Musical	Sydney Lucas	Nominated
2015	Tony Awards	Best Featured Actress in a Musical	Emily Skeggs	Nominated
2015	Tony Awards	Best Direction of a Musical	Sam Gold	Won
2015	Tony Awards	Best Orchestrations	John Clancy	Nominated
2015	Tony Awards	Best Scenic Design of a Musical	David Zinn	Nominated
2015	Tony Awards	Best Lighting Design of a Musical	Ben Stanton	Nominated
2015	Theatre World Awards	Outstanding Debut Performance	Sydney Lucas	Won
2015	Theatre World Awards	Outstanding Debut Performance	Emily Skeggs	Won
2016	Grammy Awards	Best Musical Theater Album		Nominated

=== Original London production ===
Year	Award	Category	Nominee	Result
2018	Evening Standard Theatre Award	Best Musical		Nominated
2019	Laurence Olivier Award	Best New Musical		Nominated
2019	Laurence Olivier Award	Best Actor in a Musical	Zubin Varla	Nominated
2019	Laurence Olivier Award	Outstanding Achievement in Music	Jeanine Tesori and Lisa Kron	Nominated

== Planned film adaptation ==
In 2020, Jake Gyllenhaal and a partner secured the rights to produce a film version of the musical under their Nine Stories Productions banner, with plans to star Gyllenhaal as Bruce Bechdel, with Sam Gold making his feature film directorial debut. In 2023, Alison Bechdel stated that Gyllenhaal was no longer involved in any upcoming film adaptation. According to The Hollywood Reporter, however, Gyllenhaal and Nine Stories signed a three-year first-look deal with Amazon MGM Studios in 2024, and the adaptation is one of the projects "in development".
