= Emma Mulvaney-Stanak =

American politician (born 1980 or 1981)

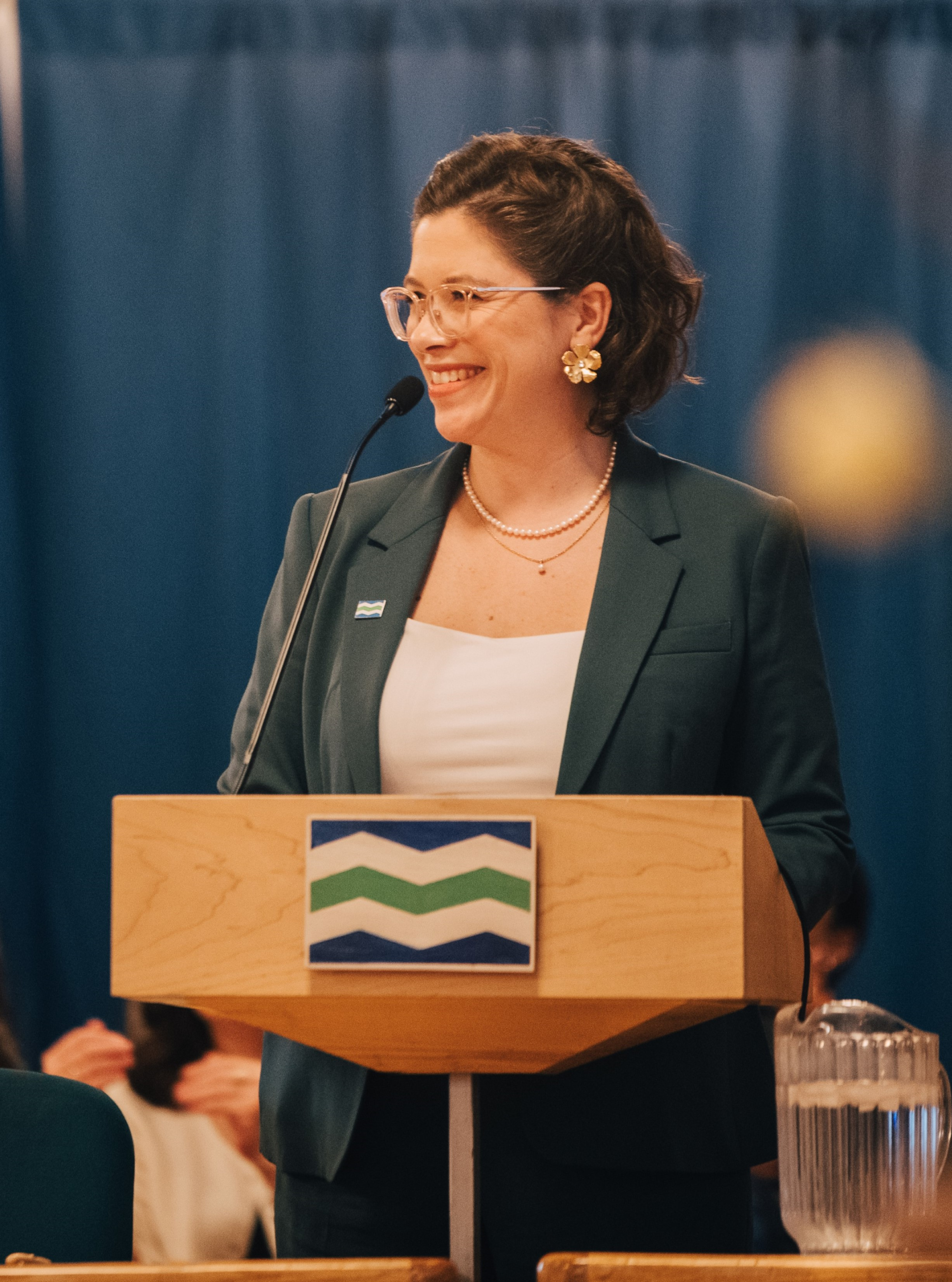
- Mulvaney-Stanak in 2024

43rd Mayor of Burlington
- Incumbent
- Assumed office April 1, 2024
- Preceded by: Miro Weinberger

Member of the Vermont House of Representatives from the Chittenden-17 district
- In office January 2021 – April 1, 2024
- Preceded by: Jean O'Sullivan
- Succeeded by: Abbey Duke

Chair of the Vermont Progressive Party
- In office November 10, 2013 – June 9, 2017
- Preceded by: Martha Abbott
- Succeeded by: Anthony Pollina (acting)

Member of the Burlington City Council
- In office 2010–2012
- Preceded by: Clarence Davis
- Succeeded by: Rachel Siegel
- Constituency: 3rd district
- In office 2009
- Preceded by: Jane Knodell
- Succeeded by: Bram Kranichfeld
- Constituency: 2nd district

Personal details
- Born: 1980 or 1981 (age 45–46)
- Party: Vermont Progressive
- Other political affiliations: Democratic
- Spouse: Megan Moir
- Children: 2
- Education: Smith College (BA)

Emma Mulvaney-Stanak (born 1980 or 1981) is an American politician who has served as the mayor of Burlington, Vermont, since 2024. A member of the Vermont Progressive Party, she was a member of the Burlington city council from 2009 and 2010 to 2012, and the Vermont House of Representatives from 2021 to 2024.

Mulvaney-Stanak was educated at Smith College. She became involved in politics when she was director of the Vermont Living Wage Campaign and as field director for Scudder Parker's gubernatorial campaign during the 2006 election. She was elected to the city council in 2009, but had to resign due to her moving. She returned to the city council in 2010, where she was at one point the only Progressive member. She defeated incumbent state representative Jean O'Sullivan for a seat in the state house.

Mulvaney-Stanak was elected mayor of Burlington in 2024, becoming the first Progressive to hold the office since 2012, and the first woman and openly LGBT person to serve as mayor in the city's history.

== Early life and education ==
Emma Mulvaney-Stanak and her twin sibling Lluvia were born to Joelen Mulvaney and Ed Stanak, who later ran for Vermont Attorney General with the Vermont Progressive Party's nomination in 2012. Mulvaney-Stanak graduated from Smith College with a degree in political science. She married Megan Moir, with whom she has two children.

== Career ==
=== Local and state politics ===
Mulvaney-Stanak was director of the Vermont Living Wage Campaign. She worked as field director for Scudder Parker's gubernatorial campaign during the 2006 election.

Mulvaney-Stanak was elected to succeed Jane Knodell, a member of the Progressive Party, on the city council from the 2nd district in Burlington, Vermont, with the nomination of the Progressive Party against Democratic nominee Nicole Pelletier. However, she resigned from the city council on December 15, 2009, due to her moving from the 2nd district to the 3rd district which the city charter required her to resign for. Democratic nominee Bram Kranichfeld won election to the city council from the 2nd district in the 2010 election.

Clarence Davis, a member of the Progressive Party, did not seek reelection to the city council from the 3rd district in the 2010 election. Mulvaney-Stanak won in the 2010 election without opposition. She was the only Progressive member of the fourteen-member city council following the resignation of Marisa Caldwell in 2010, which was the lowest amount for the party since 1981. She did not seek reelection in the 2012 election and Rachel Siegel was elected to succeed her.

Mulvaney-Stanak was selected to be secretary of the Vermont Progressive Party in April 2013. Martha Abbott did not seek reelection as chair of the Vermont Progressive Party. Mulvaney-Stanak was selected to be chair of the party on November 10, 2013, and was reelected in 2015. She resigned as chair on June 9, 2017, to focus on her job working for the Vermont-National Education Association and Anthony Pollina was selected to be interim chair.

=== Vermont House of Representatives ===
Mulvaney-Stanak ran for the Progressive and Democratic nomination for a seat in the Vermont House of Representatives from the Chittenden-6-2 district during the 2020 election. She defeated incumbent Democratic Representative Jean O'Sullivan in the Democratic primary and won in the general election without opposition. During the primary O'Sullivan claimed that Mulvaney-Stanak was not a real Democrat.

In 2020, Mulvaney-Stanak was selected by a unanimous vote of seven to be assistant chair of the Vermont Progressive Party's caucus in the state house. She was selected to become the caucus' leader on November 21, 2023, with Taylor Small replacing her as assistant leader.

=== Mayoralty ===
On October 16, 2023, Mulvaney-Stanak announced her run for mayor of Burlington after Mayor Miro Weinberger announced that he would not seek reelection. She defeated Democratic nominee Joan Shannon in the election. Mulvaney-Stanak was the first woman and open member of the LGBT community elected as mayor of Burlington. Prior to her election only 10 women had been elected as mayor across Vermont since 1793.

Mulvaney-Stanak was allowed to remain in the state house after being elected mayor, but chose to resign so that she could focus on her mayoral duties. Governor Phil Scott appointed Abbey Duke, a Democrat who was one of six options presented by the Democratic and Progressive parties, to succeed her. Mulvaney-Stanak and other Progressives were critical of Scott for not appointing another member of the Progressive Party to succeed her.

Mulvaney-Stanak entered office with a budget deficit of $9 million, but this was later determined to be $14 million due to miscalculations. The $107.8 million budget she passed for 2025 had $1.35 million in revenue after raising the tax rate by 10.7%. In June 2024, friends organized a special food drive for Mulvaney-Stanak and her family in which supporters could pay for their meals. Mulvaney-Stanak received criticism for accepting the meal assistance, and defended her behavior by citing the difficulties of balancing the duties of public office with raising a family.

Mulvaney-Stanak appointed public defender Jessica Brown to serve as city attorney, a position which had been vacant for two years. She reappointed Jon Murad as chief of police in 2024. On January 8, 2025, she issued an executive order requiring that all press releases by the police department be approved by her office.

== Electoral history ==
2010 Burlington, Vermont city council 2nd district election
Party	Candidate	Votes	%
Progressive	Emma Mulvaney-Stanak	643	93.05%
Write-in		48	6.95%
Total votes		691	100.00%

2020 Vermont House of Representative Chittenden-6-2 district election
Primary election
Party	Candidate	Votes	%
Democratic	Emma Mulvaney-Stanak	728	57.64%
Democratic	Jean O'Sullivan (incumbent)	527	41.73%
Write-in		8	0.48%
Total votes		1,263	100.00%
	Blank	105	
General election
Progressive	Emma Mulvaney-Stanak		
Democratic	Emma Mulvaney-Stanak		
Total	Emma Mulvaney-Stanak	2,223	96.53%
Write-in		80	3.47%
Total votes		2,303	100.00%
	Blank	587	

2024 Burlington mayoral election
Party	Candidate	Votes	%
Progressive	Emma Mulvaney-Stanak	7,612	51.4%
Democratic	Joan Shannon	6,696	45.2%
Independent	Will Emmons	273	1.8%
Independent	Chris Haessly	205	1.4%
Total votes		14,786	100.00%

== Works cited ==
=== News ===
- "Mulvaney-Stanak will not be seeking re-election to Burlington City Council". Vermont Digger. January 12, 2012.
- "Progressive Party State Chair Steps Down". Vermont Digger. June 9, 2017.
- "Vermont House Progressive caucus elects all women leadership team". Vermont Digger. December 22, 2020.
- Donoghue, Mike (June 11, 2024). "Burlington mayor gets free meals". VermontBiz. Archived from the original on June 14, 2024.
- Elder-Connors, Liam (March 5, 2024). "Emma Mulvaney-Stanak elected mayor of Burlington". Vermont Public. Archived from the original on February 22, 2025.
- Freese, Alicia (June 9, 2017). "Mulvaney-Stanak Resigns Vermont Progressive Party Chairmanship". Seven Days.
- Freese, Alicia (November 4, 2013). "Vermont Democrats re-elect Deans as party chair". Vermont Digger.
- Guber, Anna (January 10, 2025). "Burlington Mayor Emma Mulvaney-Stanak issues executive order requiring approval of all police press releases". WPTZ. Archived from the original on February 22, 2025.
- Guha, Auditi (March 10, 2024). "'A unicorn who gets it': Emma Mulvaney-Stanak's historic mayoral win celebrated in Burlington". VTDigger. Archived from the original on February 22, 2025.
- Hallenbeck, Terri (November 7, 2016). "The Mulvaney-Stanaks: A Family Divided Over a Vermont Election". Seven Days.
- Herrick, John (November 10, 2013). "Progressives elect Mulvaney-Stanak chair, outline agenda". Vermont Digger.
- Huntley, Katharine (June 12, 2024). "Burlington mayor defends her family's 'Meal Train,' says it does not violate ethics policy". WCAX-TV. Archived from the original on June 14, 2024.
- Lamdin, Courtney (September 28, 2023). "Burlington Mayor Miro Weinberger Won't Seek Reelection". Seven Days. Archived from the original on January 16, 2024.
- Landen, Xander (December 6, 2020). "Election results 'make room' for new leaders in the Progressive Party". Vermont Digger.
- Lefrak, Mikaela; Meyer, Tedra (March 13, 2024). "Incoming Burlington mayor Emma Mulvaney-Stanak shares her priorities for first 90 days". Vermont Public. Archived from the original on February 22, 2025.
- McCallum, Kevin (November 23, 2023). "Why Is the Progressive Party Losing Its Luster in Montpelier?". Seven Days. Archived from the original on October 1, 2023.
- McGuire, Jack (July 10, 2024). "Jessica Brown Appointed as Burlington City Attorney". Seven Days. Archived from the original on August 24, 2024.
- Norton, Kit (August 21, 2020). "Dems reluctant to give full voter data access to Zuckerman's campaign". Vermont Digger.
- McDonald, Corey (June 25, 2024). "Burlington council gives unanimous approval to mayor's $107.8 million budget". VTDigger. Archived from the original on February 22, 2025.
- McDonald, Corey (May 31, 2024). "Burlington Mayor Emma Mulvaney-Stanak reappoints Jon Murad as police chief". VTDigger. Archived from the original on February 22, 2025.
- McDonald, Corey (May 6, 2024). "Phil Scott appoints Democrat to fill Emma Mulvaney-Stanak's House seat". VTDigger. Archived from the original on February 22, 2025.
- Robinson, Shaun (March 5, 2024). "Emma Mulvaney-Stanak elected mayor of Burlington, 1st woman to lead the city". VTDigger. Archived from the original on February 22, 2025.
- Roy, Matthew (May 15, 2020). "Emma Mulvaney-Stanak Announces Bid for Vermont House". Seven Days.
- Totten, Shay (March 3, 2010). "Councilor Calls for Mayor Bob Kiss to Resign". Seven Days.
- Totten, Shay (December 1, 2009). "Progressive to Step Down from Burlington City Council". Seven Days.
- Totten, Shay (January 24, 2010). "Two-Term Progressive Councilor Won't Seek Reelection". Seven Days.

=== Newspapers ===
- "Aides: Asking for liveable wages". Rutland Herald. July 19, 2003. p. 7 – via Newspapers.com.
- "Caldwell: Ward 3 councilor resigns effective this weekend". The Burlington Free Press. July 31, 2010. p. 13 – via Newspapers.com.
- "Emma Mulvaney-Stanak". The Burlington Free Press. February 20, 2009. p. 7 – via Newspapers.com.
- Baird, Joel (November 3, 2010). "Ward 3 comes down to write-ins". The Burlington Free Press. p. 15 – via Newspapers.com.

=== Web ===
- "2020 State Representative Democratic Primary". Secretary of State of Vermont.
- "2020 State Representative General Election". Secretary of State of Vermont.
- "Official Results Of 2010 Annual City Election" (PDF). Burlington, Vermont. March 2, 2010. Archived (PDF) from the original on March 10, 2021.
- "Unofficial Results of 2012 Annual City Election" (PDF). Burlington, Vermont. March 6, 2012. Archived (PDF) from the original on March 10, 2021.

Political offices
Preceded by Miro Weinberger	Mayor of Burlington; 2024–present	Incumbent
