= Are You My Mother? (memoir) =

2012 memoir by Alison Bechdel

- Author: Alison Bechdel
- Illustrator: Alison Bechdel
- Genre: Graphic novel, memoir
- Publisher: Houghton Mifflin
- Publication date: May 1, 2012
- Pages: 289 pp.
- ISBN: 978-0-618-98250-9
- OCLC: 798732023
- Preceded by: Fun Home

Are You My Mother?: A Comic Drama is a 2012 graphic memoir written and illustrated by Alison Bechdel, about her relationship with her mother. The book is a companion piece to her earlier work Fun Home, which deals with her relationship with her father. The book interweaves memoir with psychoanalysis and exploration of various literary works, particularly Virginia Woolf's To the Lighthouse.

Its title alludes to the 1960 children's picture book Are You My Mother? by P. D. Eastman.

== Synopsis ==
Are You My Mother? is composed of seven chapters, each introduced by a description of a dream that Bechdel had. The dream is then interpreted and explained in the context of various events in Bechdel's life, jumping backwards and forwards in time in doing so. The book covers events that occurred before she was born all the way up to the process of editing Are You My Mother? itself. The book is Bechdel's attempt to come to grips with her relationship with her mother, an unaffectionate amateur actor trapped in a marriage to a closeted homosexual. In exploring her mother's lack of warmth, Bechdel supplements her own recollections with insights from the psychoanalyst Donald Winnicott, particularly with reference to his notion of the true self and the false self and his theory on transitional objects. While various scenes depicting visits to psychologists later in life make it clear that Bechdel's childhood left a troubling mark on her adult life, the book ends on an uplifting note, concluding with the lines, "There was a certain thing I did not get from my mother. There is a lack, a gap, a void. But in its place, she has given me something else. Something, I would argue, that is far more valuable. She has given me the way out."

Much like Fun Home, Are You My Mother? folds various other works into the story to help illuminate the narrative. As well as the writings of Donald Winnicott, Bechdel pulls from the works of the feminist poet and essayist Adrienne Rich, Virginia Woolf's To the Lighthouse and A Room of One's Own, the works of Sigmund Freud, the 1967 television adaption of The Forsyte Saga, Mozart's Don Giovanni, Molière's The Miser, and many other works.

== Reception ==
In her book review for The New York Times, Katie Roiphe wrote that Are You My Mother? is "as complicated, brainy, inventive and satisfying as the finest prose memoirs." Laura Miller's review for The Guardian called the book profound, but stated that the book's heavy focus on psychoanalysis weighs it down.

The book won the 2013 Judy Grahn Award for Lesbian Non-Fiction, and was a finalist for the 2013 Lambda Literary Award for Lesbian Memoir or Biography and the 2012 Los Angeles Times Book Prize for Graphic Novel.

== See also ==
- Dykes to Watch Out For
