= James J. McNamara =

American politician (1927–2022)

Member of the Vermont House of Representatives from the Chittenden 7-5 district
- In office 1994–2000
- Preceded by: Barbara L. Grimes
- Succeeded by: Mark Larson

Personal details
- Born: April 9, 1927 Colchester, Vermont, U.S.
- Died: November 27, 2022 (aged 95)
- Party: Democratic
- Education: Holy Cross College; Cornell Law School

James J. McNamara (April 9, 1927 – November 27, 2022) was an American politician. He served as a Democratic member for the Chittenden 7-5 district of the Vermont House of Representatives.

== Life and career ==
McNamara was born in Colchester, Vermont. He attended Holy Cross College and Cornell Law School.

In 1994, McNamara defeated Steven A. Ciardelli in the general election for the Chittenden 7-5 district of the Vermont House of Representatives, winning 55 percent of the votes. McNamara lost re-election in 2000 due in part to his opposition to the Champlain Flyer rail service.

McNamara died on November 27, 2022, at the age of 95.
