= The Secret to Superhuman Strength =

2021 book by Alison Bechdel

- Author: Alison Bechdel
- Language: English
- Publisher: Houghton Mifflin Harcourt
- Publication date: May 4, 2021
- Pages: 240
- ISBN: 978-0-544-38765-2

The Secret to Superhuman Strength is a 2021 graphic memoir by Alison Bechdel.

In it she chronicles the "exercise epoch" of body building, fitness fads, outdoor sports, and the popularization of Asian martial and healing arts. Describing herself as a "vigorous type" and a bit of an "exercise freak", she analyzes the reasons for this as ranging from "typical stress management" to slightly "perverse fixation on muscles", starting in early childhood seeing advertisements and workout videos by Charles Atlas and Jack Lalanne. She admits her "ontological confusion" was induced by "non-stop television watching" typical of the baby boomer / generation x cusp. The book explores the influence of aspirational branding, and advertising athletic and outdoor wear on body image and gender dysphoria.

Bechdel explores the transcendentalist movement of the romantic era and the beatnik era through the relationships of poets and writers of those eras.

Bechdel also describes her relationships with her mother, her father, her jobs, and her girlfriends, gurus, and therapists, concluding that "the only thing to transcend is the idea that there's something to transcend. Nirvana is Samsara."

It was included in several "Best of" publishing awards in 2021, including The Best Graphic Book from Publishers Weekly and one of The New York Times Best Graphic Novels.
