= WomaNews =

Newspaper

- April 1989 front page
- Type: Monthly newspaper
- Editor: WomaNews Collective
- Founded: 1979

WomaNews was the name of two radical feminist newspapers that were active around the same time. One began in Gainesville, Florida in the 1970s, and another was started in New York, New York.
