= VTDigger =

Journalism platform based in Vermont

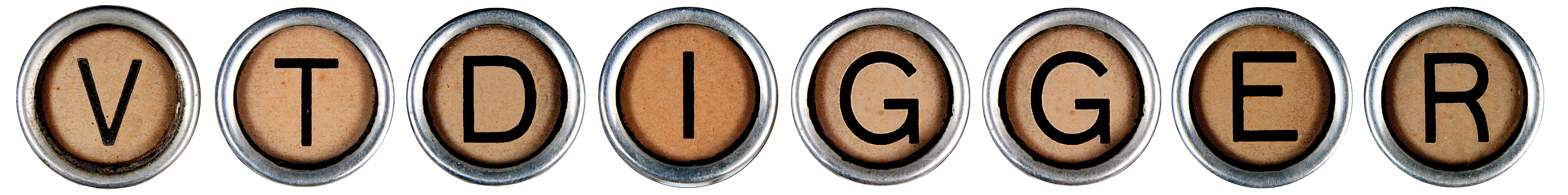
- Type: Daily digital news outlet
- Format: Digital
- Owner(s): Vermont Journalism Trust, 501(c)3 nonprofit organization
- Founder: Anne Galloway
- Publisher: Sky Barsch (CEO)
- Editor-in-chief: Geeta Anand
- Founded: September 2009; 17 years ago
- Political alignment: non-partisan
- Headquarters: PO Box 1374, Montpelier, VT 05601
- Circulation: 650,000 (as of 2025)
- Website: vtdigger.org

VTDigger is an investigative online newspaper based in Vermont. Founded in September 2009 by Anne Galloway, the newspaper reports an average monthly audience of approximately 500,000. It has won awards from the New England Newspaper & Press Association.

The outlet is funded primarily through donations ($2.2 million in 2022), as well as through underwriting (business support). The newspaper receives support from the American Journalism Project.

== History ==
The VTDigger was founded in September 2009 by Anne Galloway, with a focus on the politics, economy, environment, education, culture, and public policy of Vermont.

In 2010, VTDigger merged with the nonprofit Vermont Journalism Trust. As part of the Trust, support comes from the general public, foundations and businesses, including sponsors, gifts, and organization membership.

During her tenure as executive director, Anne Galloway was nominated for the "Vermonter of the Year Award" by The Burlington Free Press in 2016. In 2018, she reported total compensation of $64,519 from VTDigger. In May 2022, Galloway stepped down and assumed the role of editor-at-large.

Jim Welch was named interim executive director and served in that role from May 2022 to April 2023.

In March 2023, Schuyler "Sky" Barsch was named CEO of VTDigger and she began in the role in April 2023.

In July 2023, Vermont experienced devastating flooding, and VTDigger produced the most prolific coverage in the state. VTDigger’s flooding coverage, along with its accountability reporting and investigative work, earned it numerous industry awards, including A-Mark prizes from the New England Press & Newspaper Association, and “Distinguished News Site” in 2024 and 2026.

After helping the organization get on a more stable financial footing, Barsch and the union representing VTDigger employees were at an impasse in contract negotiations regarding the use of artificial intelligence. In January 2026, Barsch indicated she would step down as CEO effective June 1, 2026. In March 2026, editor-in-chief Geeta Ananda also announced she would be leaving VTDigger as of June 30, 2026. Sue Allen was announced as the interim editor.

VTDigger and its employee union reached a contract agreement in April 2026, with increases in pay and days off as well as terms around the use of AI.

In May 2026, Brendan Kinney was named CEO as of June 2026.

== Mentions ==
The New York Times reported that VTDigger had built social trust, which it said had helped Vermont respond to the challenges of the COVID-19 pandemic.

Mark Shanahan wrote a front-page feature about VTDigger for the Boston Globe.

Local Independent Online News Publishers named VTDigger as the co-winner for the 2023 Public Service Award (Large Revenue Tier).

The Institute for Nonprofit News and the Single Subject News Project at Harvard Kennedy School's Shorenstein Center on Media, Politics and Public Policy published a case study about VTDigger titled "VTDigger: A Rising Star in Nonprofit News," which details the birth and rise of VTDigger and the role of Anne Galloway in this effort. In May 2018, according to the Institute for Nonprofit News, the VTDigger was averaging 300,000 monthly users with "a staff of 19 full-time employees, and an annual budget over $1.5 million".

VTDigger is often referenced in the Burlington Free Press for breaking stories, such as the report of the testimony of a former Burlington College trustee before a federal grand jury about the involvement of Senator Bernie Sanders' wife, Dr. Jane Sanders, in the sale of property while she was president of Burlington College. The Burlington Free Press attributed the initial report of the testimony to VTDigger. VTDigger's coverage was also reported by other newspapers across the country.

A 2010 Burlington Free Press article about the ACLU's attempt to get information from a Vermont town about an alleged racial profiling incident raised the possibility that accepting assistance from the ACLU in investigating the incident could have created a conflict of interested related to journalistic objectivity. The relationship between the VTDigger and ACLU on this case is mentioned again in a Burlington Free Press article about the ACLU's request to the VT Supreme Court to release the documents related to the incident.

== See also ==
- Institute for Nonprofit News (member)
