= Hillary Chute =

American academic

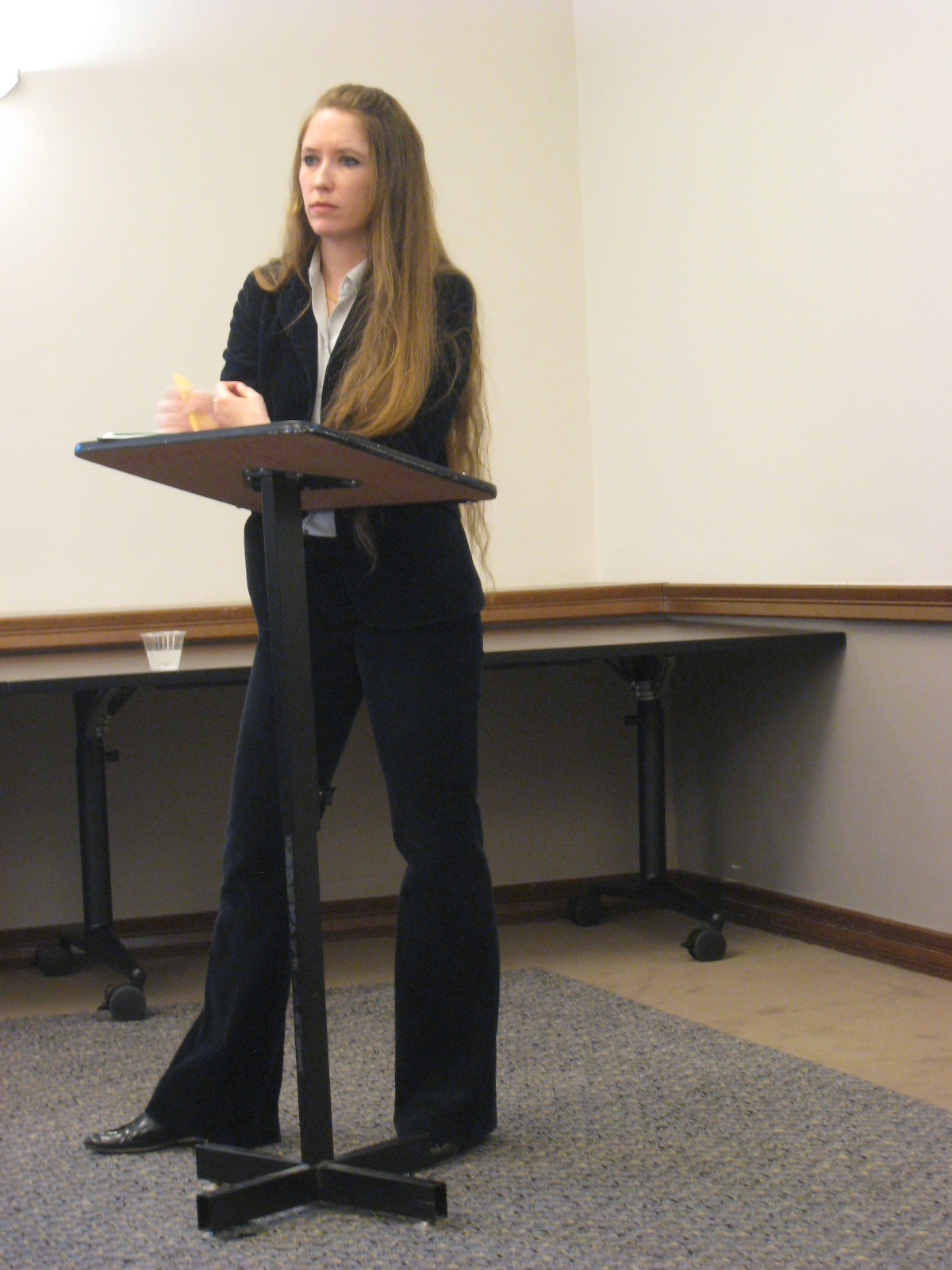
- Hillary Chute speaking at Columbia University
- Born: 1976 (age 49–50); Boston, Massachusetts
- Education: Rutgers University (Ph.D.)
- Occupations: Academic, critic, author
- Notable work: Graphic Women; Disaster Drawn; Why Comics?

Hillary Chute (born 1976 in Boston, Massachusetts) is an American literary scholar and an expert on comics and graphic narratives. She is Distinguished Professor of English and Art + Design at Northeastern University. She was formerly associate professor in the Department of English at the University of Chicago and an associate faculty member of the University’s Department of Visual Arts, as well as a visiting professor at Harvard University. She was a Junior Fellow at the Harvard Society of Fellows from 2007 to 2010.

== Writings and career ==
Chute's first book, Graphic Women (2010), covers the work of Aline Kominsky-Crumb, Phoebe Gloeckner, Lynda Barry, Marjane Satrapi, and Alison Bechdel. Her second academic book? Disaster Drawn (2016), investigates how hand-drawn comics has come of age as a serious medium for engaging history. It explores graphic narratives that document the disasters of war by such artists as Jacques Callot, Francisco Goya, Keiji Nakazawa, Art Spiegelman, and Joe Sacco.

Chute's book of interviews with contemporary cartoonists, Outside the Box, was published in 2014. Chute is the Associate Editor of Art Spiegelman’s MetaMaus, which won a 2011 National Jewish Book Award in the category Biography, Autobiography, Memoir, as well as a 2012 Eisner Award in the category of best comics-related book.

In 2006, she co-edited the "Graphic Narrative" special issue of Modern Fiction Studies. She founded the Modern Language Association’s Discussion Group on Comics and Graphic Narratives in 2009.

Chute collaborated with Bechdel in co-teaching the course “Lines of Transmission: Comics and Autobiography” at the University of Chicago as part of a Mellon Grant, and in organizing the “Comics: Philosophy and Practice” conference in 2012. In 2014, they co-authored the comics piece “Bartheses” in Critical Inquiry.

In March 2018, Chute was named a columnist on comics and graphic novels for The New York Times Book Review. Chute has written for Poetry about the relation of comics and poetry, reported for Artforum from San Diego Comic-Con, and reviewed comics for The New York Review of Books. Her book Why Comics?: From Underground to Everywhere (2017) was named one of the Best Books of 2017 by Kirkus Reviews and one of the "100 Notable Books of 2018" by The New York Times.

== Publications ==
- Why Comics?: From Underground to Everywhere (HarperCollins, 2017)
- Disaster Drawn: Visual Witness, Comics and Documentary Form (Harvard University Press, 2016)
- Comics & Media: A Critical Inquiry Book, co-edited with Patrick Jagoda (University of Chicago Press, 2014)
- Outside the Box: Interviews with Contemporary Cartoonists (University of Chicago Press, 2014)
- MetaMaus by Art Spiegelman, Associate Editor (Pantheon Books, 2011)
- Graphic Women: Life Narrative and Contemporary Comics (Columbia University Press, 2010)
