= Seven Days (newspaper) =

Newspaper in Burlington, Vermont

- Type: Alternative weekly
- Owners: Pamela Polston; Paula Routly; Don Eggert; Cathy Resmer; Colby Roberts
- Publisher: Da Capo Publishing
- Founded: 1995
- Headquarters: Burlington, Vermont
- OCLC number: 38931753
- Website: www.sevendaysvt.com

Seven Days is an alternative weekly newspaper that is distributed every Wednesday in Vermont. The American Newspapers Representatives estimate Seven Days' circulation to be 35,000 papers. It is distributed free of charge throughout Burlington, Middlebury, Montpelier, Stowe, the Mad River Valley, Rutland and St. Albans.

Seven Days is published by Da Capo Publishing, Inc., and is owned by Paula Routly and a group of longtime employees.

In addition to publishing Seven Days, Da Capo hosts two annual events in Vermont: Vermont Restaurant Week and the Vermont Tech Jam.

== History ==
Seven Days was founded in 1995 by reporters Pamela Polston and Paula Routly. The original capital investment of $68,000 by angel investors was repaid within three years. Originally, the paper's title was going to be the Vermont Voice, however a dispute over the name caused them to settle on Seven Days instead. Circulation of the newspaper in 1995 was around 12,000.

Angelo Lynn, owner and publisher of the Addison County Independent (a local newspaper based in Middlebury, VT) was a valued mentor to the pair of owners as they got their start.

From 1995 – 2002 Seven Days saw a 20% increase in revenue each year.

In 2013 Seven Days expanded its weekly circulation to 36,000 by including the Northeast Kingdom in its distribution radius.

Pamela Polston and Paula Routly, who co-founded the paper, were inducted into the New England Newspaper Hall of Fame in 2015. Consulting editor Candace Page was inducted into the New England Newspaper Hall of Fame in 2017.

In 2019, Seven Days hired reporter Kate O'Neill to launch a year-long project reporting on the opioid epidemic in Vermont.

In March 2020, with a decline in advertising revenue due to the coronavirus pandemic, Seven Days temporarily laid off seven employees.

== Coverage and ads ==
Seven Days covers many aspects of life in Vermont. Columns and stories in the newspaper often concern such topics as state and local politics, Vermont organizations and charities, and general human interest stories. It also features local music listings, an alternative comics section, art, movie, and theater reviews, event listings, local dining, classified advertisements, and personals. Each year, Seven Days asks its readers to place votes for the "Seven Daysies," which is a compilation of favorite people and places to visit throughout the state.

== Awards ==
=== Lake Champlain Regional Chamber of Commerce ===
2000 – Business of the Year

=== Burlington Business Association ===
2008 – Business of the Year

== Recognition ==
2013 – Editor & Publisher – "10 Newspapers that Do It Right"

2013 – The Atlantic article "Strange Tales from the North Country: A Profitable (Print) Newspaper"
