= List of largest single-volume books by page count =

This page provides lists of the largest/thickest single-volume books to date both published and unpublished. This list does not include works that span over more than one volume, such as À la recherche du temps perdu, which is regarded as the longest novel ever written.

Records indicate that Guinness World Records began taking in "thickest book" nominations in 2009, where The Complete Miss Marple held the title with 4,032 pages. In 2013, Danish dictionary Verdens Største Ordbog won the title for "Thickest Unpublished Book," with a page count of 89,471.

According to Guinness World Records, as of 2023, World-2023 ESN Publications and London Organisation of Skills Development Ltd is the thickest book ever to have been physically produced, with a page count of 100,100. Guinness also credits Shree Haricharitramrut Sagar as being the longest book to ever be published with a page count of 10,080.

== Single-volume length ==
Books with more than 1,000 pages are rare due to impracticality. Ilan Manouach's Onepiece, a book of more than 20,000 pages, was labeled functionally as a "sculpture" because of the difficulty one would experience when trying to turn its many pages. Many novels with a total page count that reaches into the thousands are split into different volumes. Novels that use this method are often regarded as a singular entity in conversations pertaining to "the largest novels ever written." For example, In Search of Lost Time by Marcel Proust and Artamène by Madeleine de Scudéry (and/or) Georges de Scudéry, both titles which span over several volumes, are regarded by some sources as the longest novels ever written.

Single-volume books with page counts exceeding 2,000 pages exist for a plethora of different reasons. Books that fall under this category include anthologies, dictionaries, and legal records. Single-volume books with exceedingly high page counts are often produced through a deliberate effort. This may be done in order to break a record, raise awareness, or commemorate an event. Books of this magnitude are usually produced by large teams of people in order to be made. The thickest single-volume book in the world, World-2023 ESN Publications and London Organisation of Skills Development Ltd, with a page count of 100,100 containing 7,862 articles, required a team of 292 participants.

== Key ==
Published
Unpublished
Unknown publication status

== List of largest books by page count ==
Book	Author(s)	Page total	Dimensions cm (in) (d x h x w)	Description
World-2023 ESN Publications and London Organisation of Skills Development Ltd		100,100	580 (228.48) (depth)	The book is an anthology of articles collected from universities across India and the United Kingdom. The diverse subject matter is meant to demonstrate various feats of mankind. These include engineering, medicine, arts, and science.
Verdens Største Ordbog		89,471	462 (181.92) (depth)	A compilation of 46 dictionaries available on Ordbogen.com.
Pátria Amada	Vinicios Leoncio	41,000	210 (82.68) (depth)	Out of frustration over Brazil's tax laws, Brazilian tax lawyer Vinicios Leoncio spent 23 years compiling all of its legislation into a single book. It was written in 22 Arial font on pieces of paper.
Onepiece	Ilan Manouach (compiler); Eiichiro Oda (contents)	21,540	80 x 12 x 11 (31.20 x 6.96 x 4.56)	A compilation of 102 volumes of the One Piece manga series.
Poetry City Marathon	Dave Morice	10,119	61 x 23 x 22 (24 x 11.04 x 8.52)	A poetry book conceived in honor of Iowa City being named "City of Literature" by the UNESCO.
Shree Haricharitramrut Sagar	Sadguru Shri Aadharanand Swami	10,080	50 x 22 x 14 (19.56 x 8.64 x 5.64)	A biography of Bhagwan Shree Swaminarayan.
Century Dictionary (1914)		8,500	24 x 27 x 32 (12.24 x 10.56 x 9.48)	A dictionary of the English language.
Kavyodadhi’ / Kavyodadhi Mahagranth	Vallabhdas Jerambhai Dabariya	5,915		A collection of 12,345 Gujarati poems.
Wikipedia	Rob Matthews	5,000		A printed version of 2,559 featured Wikipedia articles from 2009.
The Complete Miss Marple	Agatha Christie	4,032		The complete Miss Marple series–12 novels and 20 short stories–compiled into a single volume.
Official Gazette of the United States Patent Office Volume CXXVII. March – April 1907.		3,820	17 x 21 x 28 (6.96 x 8.04 x 11.04)	The 127th volume in a collection documenting United States patents. A photo shared by an associate of the Thomas Edison National Historical Park indicates that other volumes in this collection may be of a similar length. Only volume CXXVII's official page count has been disclosed.
Webster's New International Dictionary (second edition)		3,210	14 x 23 x 30 (5.52 x 9.24 x 12)	A dictionary of the English language. Editors claim for there to be more than 600,000 entries.
Webster's Third New International Dictionary		2,816	8 x 24 x 32 (3.24 x 9.48 x 12.84)	A dictionary of the English language. This rendition includes 476,000 entries.
Cumulative Book Index 1938-1942	Mary Burhnam and Regina Goldman (editors), Carol Hurd (managing editor)	2,722		A World List of Books in the English Language.
Cumulative Book Index 1933-1937	Mary Burhnam (editor), Carol Hurd (managing editor)	2,680		A World List of Books in the English Language.
Cumulative Book Index 1943-1948	Regina Goldman Grossman and Nina R. Thompson (editors), Mary E. McLaughlin and Helaine MacKeigan (managing editors)	2,566		A World List of Books in the English Language.
Death Note All-In-One Edition	Tsugumi Ohba Takeshi Obata	2,400	11 x 18 x 8 (4.68 x 7.08 x 3.36)	A collection of all 12 volumes of the Death Note manga series.
Shonen Jummaga Special Commemorative Edition		2,264	13 (5.16) (depth)	A collection of 44 different manga series compiled by Weekly Shōnen Jump and Weekly Shōnen Magazine.
Webster's New Twentieth Century Dictionary		2,129	12 x 22 x 29 (4.80 x 8.76 x 11.28)	A dictionary of the English language.

=== Unknown placement ===
Book	Author(s)	Dimensions cm (in) (d x h x w)	Description
Reference Catalogue of Current Literatures (vol. I-III)		26 (10.20) (depth)	UK Publishers catalogues for the year 1913. The third volume measured in at around 10 inches thick.
London Gazette (Apr. - June, 1919)		24 (9.48) (depth)	According to the National Library of Scotland, this is the largest book in their collection.
