= Henning Bergenholtz =

Danish linguist

Henning John Bergenholtz (born 26 August 1944) is a Danish linguist, who is head of Center for Lexicography at Aarhus School of Business in Denmark. Professor Bergenholtz has contributed to lexicography as a science with publications on theoretical lexicography as well as several printed and electronic dictionaries.

Bergenholtz went to study in Germany at age 16. He received his master's degree at the Technische Universität Berlin in 1973, and his doctorate degrees at the University of Essen in 1975 and 1978. He was a lecturer at universities in Cologne, Bonn and Bochum and moved back to Denmark in 1987.

In an interview to Danmarks Radio in 2007 he said that Wikipedia was more trustworthy than most other encyclopedic dictionaries. He is currently an advisor regarding the Danske Netordbog, part of Ordbogen.com.

On 17 June 2010, he received a Honoris Causa Doctorate by the University of Valladolid. He is a member of the Norwegian Academy of Science and Letters.

== Bibliography ==
- Henning Bergenholtz/Sven Tarp (eds.): Manual of Specialised Lexicography. Benjamins Publishing 1995.
- Sandro Nielsen/Sven Tarp (eds.): Lexicography in the 21st Century. In honour of Henning Bergenholtz. John Benjamins Publishing 2009. ISBN 978-90-272-2336-4
