= Allan Kornblum (publisher) =

American publisher (1949–2014)

- Born: February 16, 1949; New York City
- Died: November 23, 2014 (aged 65)
- Occupation: Publisher

Allan Mark Kornblum (February 16, 1949 – November 23, 2014) was an American publisher and fine printer who founded Coffee House Press, a nonprofit independent press based in Minneapolis, Minnesota. He was a poet and significant figure in the Actualist Poetry Movement.

== Young poet and mimeo magazine editor ==
Born in New York City, and raised in Delaware and Massachusetts., Kornblum first planned a career as a high-school choir director and attended New York University. In the fall of 1969 and the spring of 1970, while living in Manhattan he attended workshops at the Poetry Project at St. Mark's Church. While there he became aware of the many mimeo poetry magazines edited by young poets. He felt that editing one was part of a young poet's coming of age.

Kornblum moved to Iowa City in the fall of 1970, and attended the University of Iowa. While in Iowa City he met several young poets, some students at the Iowa Writers' Workshop, and some not, including Darrell Gray, Dave Morice, George Mattingly, John Sjoberg, Chuck Miller, and Steve Toth. Kornblum edited a mimeo poetry magazine called Toothpaste, inspired by large scale Jim Dine paintings of toothbrushes he had seen at the Whitney Museum. Anselm Hollo, who taught some of these writers at the Workshop and had befriended them, suggested "You know, I think you guys have a poetry movement going on. The energy is there. All you need is a name for it." Gray named the movement Actualism, and wrote a manifesto in December 1972, which was published in Morice's magazine Gum.

The first Actualist Convention was held in Iowa City in March, 1973, and several others would follow in Berkeley, where many of the Actualists, including Gray, had migrated. Morice did many poetry marathons in Iowa City. These were live events where he would write a poem or a series of poems in public. The Actualists still in Iowa City conducted several poetry reading series, including one at Alandoni's (later Jim's) book store. The Actualist poets were anthologized in two volumes: The Actualist Anthology, edited by Morty Sklar and Darrell Gray (Iowa City: The Spirit That Moves Us Press, 1977), and The Ultimate Actualist Convention, edited by Morty Sklar, Cinda Kornblum and Dave Morice (Queens: The Spirit That Moves Us Press, 2017).

Kornblum's poems appeared in several books: Tight Pants (Iowa City: 1971), The Salad Bushes (Iowa City: Seamark Press, 1975), Threshold (West Branch, Iowa: Toothpaste Press, 1976), and Awkward Song (West Branch, Iowa: Toothpaste Press, 1980).

== Letterpress printer and fledgling publisher ==
He learned letterpress typography in a class given by Harry Duncan at the University of Iowa in the fall of 1970. He took the class unaware that letterpress was not the current technology used to produce trade books, but he said "I fell in love with letterpress printing. When I started printing I discovered I could put in a twelve to fourteen hour day, and go back the next day and do it again, and the next day and do it again." His first project, he said, "showed no sign of either talent or taste". In December 1971 Duncan's live-in apprentice, at his Cummington Press, wanted to go home for Christmas, just when Duncan had six weeks off from his teaching work at the university. Kornblum was hired as an apprentice and worked for Duncan for the six weeks, where Kornblum learned hands on the business of a literary fine printer.

In the summer of 1972, he married Cinda Wormley. Duncan was moving to the University of Nebraska Omaha to begin the university's fine arts press Abattoir Editions, and teach. He sold his house in West Branch, Iowa to the Kornblums and they founded the Toothpaste Press there, using the press room that Duncan had built in the house, issuing their first book in the winter of 1974. Toothpaste Press specialized in publishing poetry, often by members of the New York School, using letterpress. Although a fine press, Toothpaste Press's prices did not put it in the range of presses that catered only to wealthy collectors. Kornblum said he had been inspired by what Dave Haselwood had done at Auerhahn Press between 1958 and 1964. At Toothpaste Press Kornblum started to become one of the leaders of the small press movement that emerged from the 1960s and its focus on social change.

During the years Kornblum ran the Toothpaste Press it published books by Carl Rakosi, Robert Creeley, Anselm Hollo, Alice Notley, Dick Gallup, Joseph Ceravolo, Jonis Agee, Tony Hoagland, and Anne Waldman among others. His book designs and fine production began to be noticed. As Mary Peterson wrote in The North American Review: "The press uses classic Renaissance typefaces, papers that are textured and often handmade, and the books are hand-printed and -bound. As Bernard Welt says in Washington Review, they are 'some of the best looking books in the country. . .In design their bias is toward modest, slightly old-fashioned elegance; in writing they specialize in idiosyncratic but highly accessible work.' A Toothpaste book, he says, is 'funny and serious at once, quirky in subject, images and revelations, and intimate in tone.'"

== Founding Coffee House Press and developing it as an independent press ==
Eventually, however, the inherent conflict between, on the one hand, letterpress's exacting craft and the limitation in edition size it entailed, and Kornblum's desire to make conditions right for his writers to reach a larger audience, led him to rethink the idea of the press. He was also interested in publishing fiction as well as poetry. He said, "I was aware that the financial model I was using wasn't working out." Visits to the Twin Cities convinced him that he would find a vibrant environment there where an independent literary press could flourish, and indeed, both Greywolf Press and Milkweed Editions would relocate or start publishing there at about this same time.

In 1984 the Kornblums and their family moved to Minneapolis with their press equipment. His new Coffee House Press became the press-in-residence at the Minnesota Center for Book Arts. The new press became a nonprofit, and broadened its focus from exclusively letterpress to include offset. Coffee House Press continued to produce letterpress chapbooks and broadsides and even some higher-priced limited edition publications, including Allen Ginsberg's Honorable Courtship, a selection from the poet's early diaries that was chosen for the American Institute of Graphic Arts Fifty Best Books for 1994. The press would cease releasing letterpress publications, however. Kornblum said, "The trade books were taking too much time and energy and focus. . .I realized I couldn't do both (letterpress and trade books) and do them well."

His interest in publishing American poetry continued, and the press published books by Ron Padgett (whose How Long was a Pulitzer Prize finalist in poetry in 2012), Ed Sanders, Patricia Smith (whose Blood Dazzler was a National Book Award finalist in poetry in 2008), and others. Kornblum often published the work of young writers, both poets and fiction writers, with a special focus on the work of Asian-American authors, including Karen Tei Yamashita (whose I Hotel was an NBA fiction finalist in 2010), Wang Ping, Kao Kalia Yang, and Bao Phi. As Kornblum said, he published them "as representatives of the best in contemporary literature, first and foremost—then, only secondly, as representatives of minority communities." Phi said that after a performance he'd done, Kornblum had introduced himself and asked Phi to submit a manuscript to the press for publication. Phi recalled, "Like changing someone's life for the better should always be that unquestionably easy."

In 2012, Kornblum received the Minnesota Book Awards Kay Sexton Award, which recognizes overall contributions to the state's literary community. The Minnesota Center for Book Arts type library is named for him.
