= Onepiece (single volume) =

Book compiling 102 volumes of One Piece

- Author: Ilan Manouach (single volume); Eiichiro Oda (contents)
- Subject: Manga
- Publisher: JBE Publishing
- Publication place: France
- Pages: 21,540

Onepiece (stylized in all caps) is a book featuring 102 volumes of Eiichiro Oda's One Piece unofficially compiled by artist Ilan Manouach. It is most notable for being regarded as one of the thickest single-volume books to ever be published, with a total page count of 21,540. The book is meant to physically encapsulate the status quo of the online dissemination of comic books.

== Description ==
ONEPIECE is a 21,540-page book bound by Elise De Maio. Its dimensions are around 12 x 18.5 x 80 cm, and it weighs roughly 17 kilograms. According to French publishing company JBE, because of its unconventional size, the book is meant to be treated as a sculpture. The spine features artwork of the story's protagonist Monkey D. Luffy and his many adventures throughout the series. The book was published around the time of One Piece's 25th anniversary.

== Conception ==
According to French publishing company JBE, the book was conceived by Ilan Manouach in response to the "profusion of available online content and the rampant digitization of the comics industry", which "challenges the state-of-the-art of comics craftsmanship". The piece is meant to shift the understanding of digital comics being perceived as 'Big Data'. The comic is also meant to highlight how physical comics exist both as a piece of literature and as a commodity for collectors.

Manouach accomplished his goal by printing out digital editions of the manga series and then binding them together.

== Reception ==
The book was sold as a limited edition with a total of 50 copies. All copies were sold out within days of its September 7 release date at approximately €1,900 per copy.

International rights staff member Keita Murano of Shueisha–the Japanese publishing company behind One Piece–stated that JBE had not approached the company about publishing the product and did not have permission to do so. When JBE Publishing was approached about the issue of copyright infringement, a spokesperson stated:

This piece is about Manouach's work around ecosystems of comics, here as a sculptor who uses online dissemination as source material, not reading copyrighted content.
