= Poetry City Marathon =

- Author: Dave Morice
- Language: English
- Subject: Poetry
- Media type: Hardcover
- Pages: 10,119

Poetry City Marathon is a poetry book written by poet Dave "Dr. Alphabet" Morice. The book is 10,119 pages long, and is most notable for being possibly one of the thickest single-volume books ever bound, measuring in at two feet thick.

== Conception ==
The book was conceived in honor of Iowa City having been named "City of Literature" by the UNESCO. The book was written between July and October 2010 at a rate of approximately 100 pages every night for 100 nights while being sponsored by the publishing company Sackter House Media. In order to accomplish this, Morice took in submissions from artists, students, and businesses. A digital version of the book in its work-in-progress phase was available for the public to access as it was being written, allowing anyone to witness the book's progress. The book was printed on 8 1/2 by 11-inch paper by Bu Wilson and pressed by University of Iowa Libraries Preservation employee Bill Voss, a process which was completed over the course of 24 hours.

== Reception ==
The book was put on display as a highlight at a 4-month exhibition hosted by the University of Iowa Main Library in 2011, honoring the Iowa Writers' Workshop and the Actualist Poetry Movement. The singular physical copy produced for the exhibition is presently located in the library's archives.

The then-head of the Preservation Department, Nancy Kraft, stated that she hoped to submit the book to the Guinness Book of World Records as a possible contender for the world's thickest book.
