= Dave Morice =

American writer, visual artist and performance artist (1946–2026)

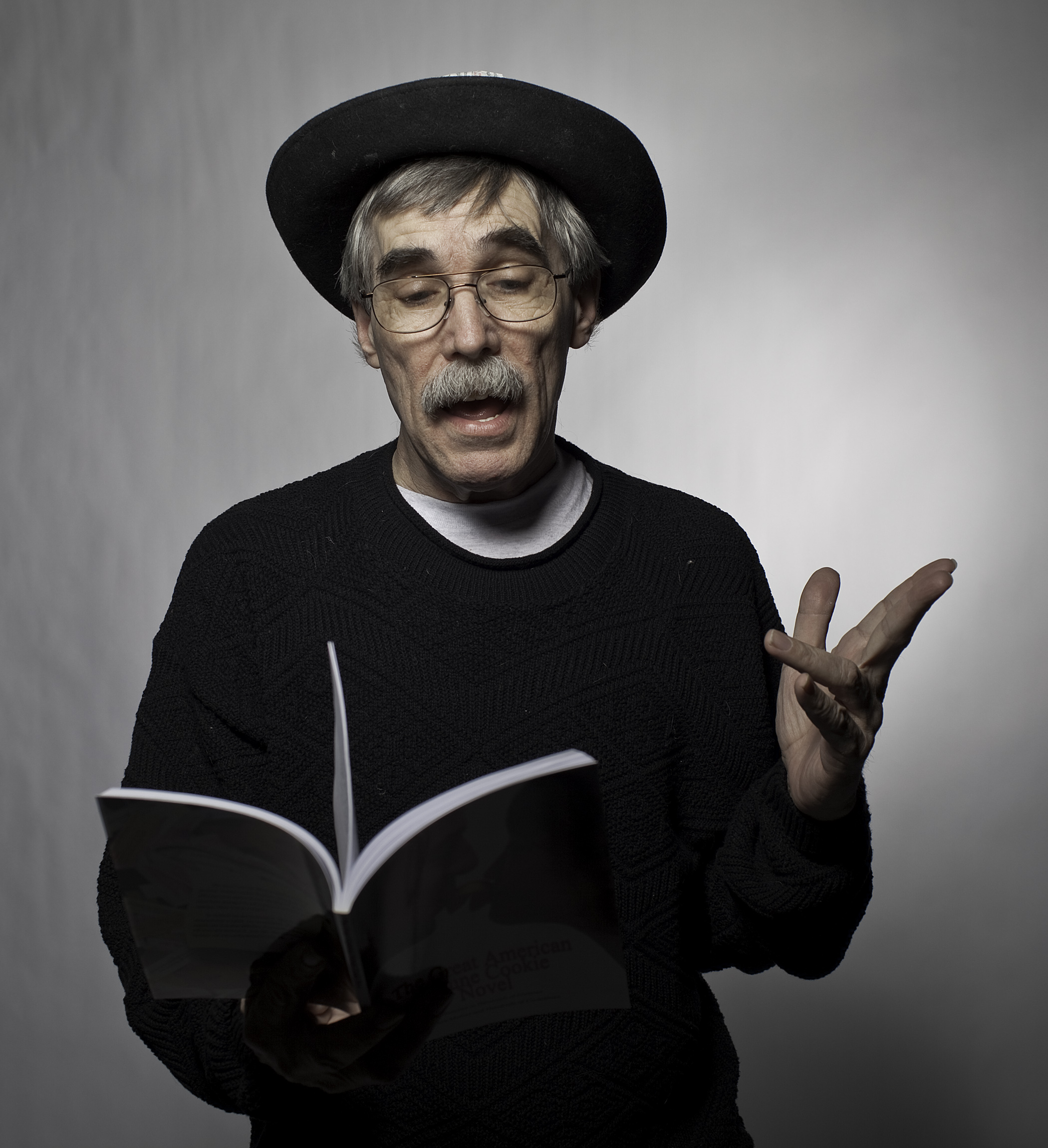
- Morice in 2012
- Born: David Jennings Patrick Morice; September 10, 1946; St. Louis, Missouri, U.S.
- Died: August 21, 2026 (aged 79)

David Jennings Patrick Morice (September 10, 1946 – August 21, 2026) was an American writer, visual artist, performance artist and educator. As well as his own name, he wrote and published under the names Joyce Holland, and Dr. Alphabet. His works include 60 Poetry Marathons, three anthologies of Poetry Comics, The Wooden Nickel Art Project, and other art and writing. He was one of the founders of the Actualist Poetry Movement.

In 2013, a biography of Morice was written by Tom Walz, professor emeritus of the University of Iowa and Joye Chizek, artist and writer called "Dr. Alphabet Unmasked: Inside the Creative Mind of David Morice". The biography feature numerous photos and illustrations as well as a complete listing of published works by Morice.

== Background ==
David Jennings Patrick Morice was the oldest of five children, born in St. Louis, Missouri, to Gilbert Morice, a Navy pilot, and Lillian Murray Morice, a ballet student. At age 6, he wrote and illustrated rhymed pourquoi poems for his mother. In grade school he drew Billy the Hobo Bee, a comic strip. In high school, he wrote Frankenstein Versus the New York Yankees, an unfinished novel. He also wrote and illustrated his first book-length work, The Idiot and the Oddity: A Children's Epic Poem, a series of about 1,250 rhyming couplets about a leprechaun named Scratch O'Flattery.

In 1969, he received a BA in English with a creative writing minor from St. Louis University, where he studied under John Knoepfle and Al Montesi. Later that year, he moved to Iowa City, Iowa to attend the University of Iowa Writers Workshop. In the Writers Workshop, he studied under Anselm Hollo, Marvin Bell, Donald Justice, Kathy Frasier, and Jack Marshalland was Beat critic Seymour Krim's research assistant. He was among a group of writers who called themselves "Actualist poets." He received an MFA from the Workshop in 1972, and an MA in Library Science in 1986. His 81-word thesis, Poems, was the shortest thesis in Iowa Writers Workshop's history. It is his first published book, privately issued in a letterpress edition of 60 copies by Al Buck. The shortest poem in it is two lines long:

at night
the flies

Morice taught Introduction to Children's Literature, a graduate course in Elementary Education at the University of Iowa, for eight years. He was married to Milagros Quijada, an architect from Caracas, Venezuela, from 1985 to 1991. They have one son, Danny, who taught him "more about children, language, art, wordplay, teaching, and life than words can express."

He served as the Associate Editor of Sackter House Media, which publishes books by and about people with disabilities. He taught writing classes at Kirkwood Community College in Cedar Rapids, Iowa.

Morice died on August 21, 2026, at the age of 79.

== The Joyce Holland Literary Hoax ==
From 1972 to 1975, Morice perpetrated a literary hoax: "He invented 'Joyce Holland', a minimalist poet and performance artist who had no small effect on the poetry world." She wrote concrete and minimalist poems and sent submissions to literary magazines, 29 of which published her work. James Mechem, editor of Out of Sight, invited her to be a guest editor. She assembled an Actualist Poets issue.

To expand the hoax, Joyce Holland (Morice) put out thirteen issues of Matchbook, a magazine of one-word poems, costing five cents a copy. She received a grant of $50 from the National Endowment for the Arts to fund the magazine. Each issue was printed on one-inch square pages stapled inside of matchbooks donated by local businesses. The sixth issue was an "all-women's issue", the seventh was a "do-it-yourself" issue, and the eighth was an "actualist convention issue".

About the extremes of poetry, critic Richard Morris writes: "Some styles go so far as to leave the traditional conception of the "poem" behind. We have found poetry, visual poetry, a poetry that is being written in prose forms..., even minimal poetry (see Joyce Holland's magazine of one-word poems, Matchbook)."

In these 12 examples, each poet's name is followed by his or her poem in parentheses. Aram Saroyan is the originator of one-word poetry.

Bill Zavatsky (armadildo)	Anne Waldman (INCA)
Aram Saroyan (puppy)	Allen Ginsberg (apocatastasis)
Pat Casteel (puppylust)	Andrei Codrescu (GASOLINE)
Tom Disch (Manna)	g.p. skratz (electrizzzzz)
Lyn Lifshin (contagious)	Gerard Malanga (Monther)
Bruce Andrews & Michael Lally (grap)	Peter Schjeldahl (shirty)

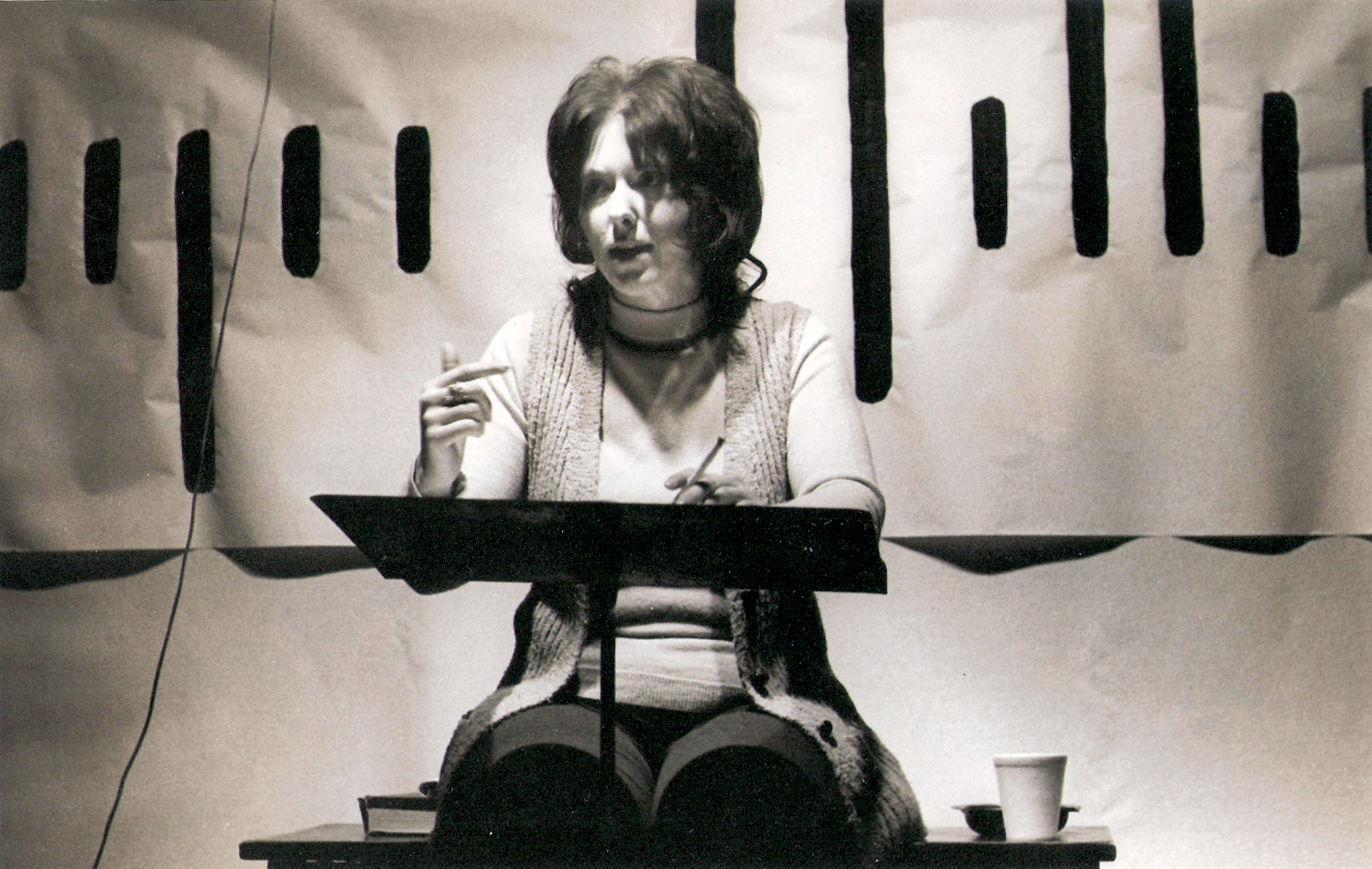
P.J. Casteel as Joyce Holland

Holland also published Alphabet Anthology, a collection of one-letter poems by 104 contributors. The index tallied up the letters, showing that "o" was chosen most often, and "c" was chosen by no one.

Morice's girlfriend, P.J. Casteel, an actress, played the physical role by giving readings and by meeting visiting writers to whom she was introduced as Joyce Holland. During these visits, the Actualists, who were in on the hoax, called her by that name. In 1974, Morice and Holland (Casteel) appeared on Tom Snyder's Tomorrow show. During the program, Morice wrote a poem on her dress, and Holland led the audience in a "Poetry Cheer".

== Dr. Alphabet and the Poetry Marathons ==
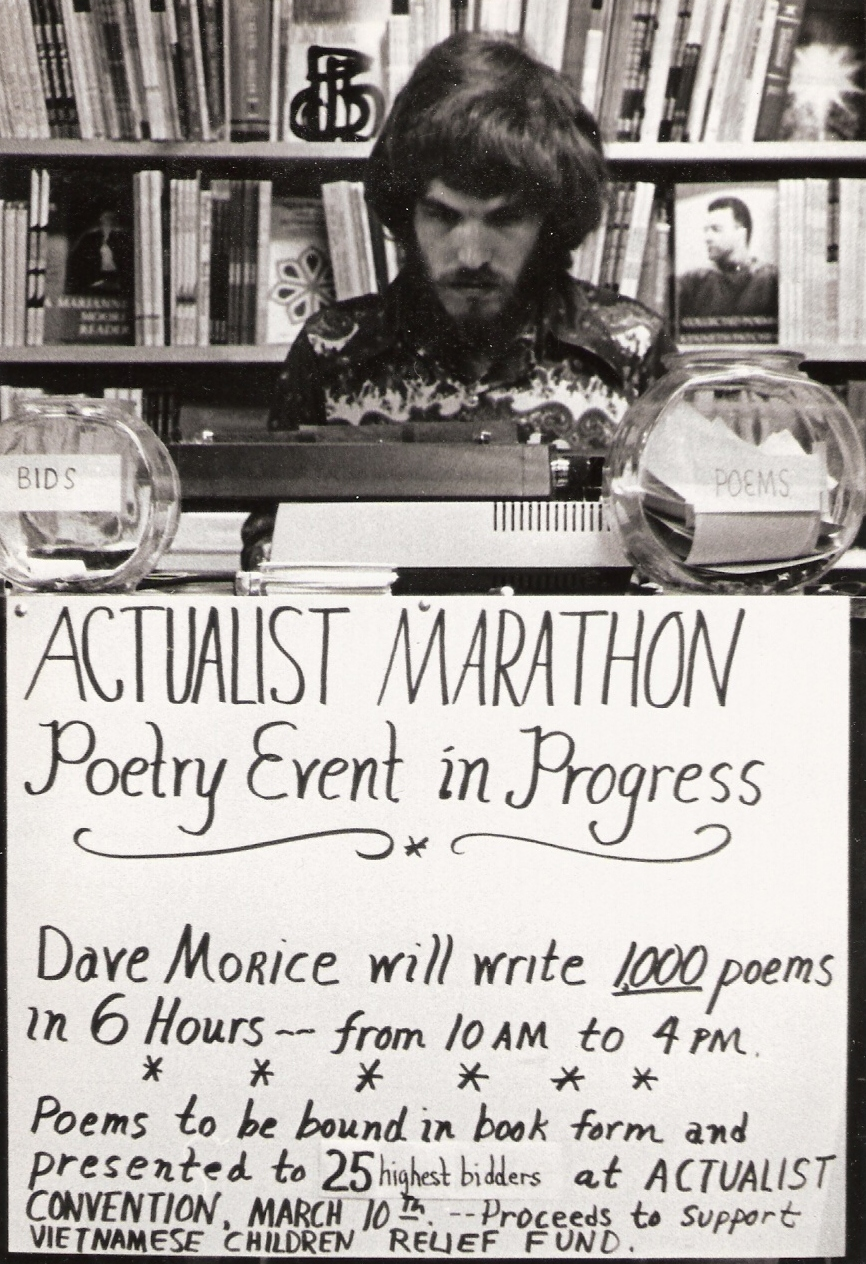
1st Actualist Poetry Marathon

He has been called the "P.T. Barnum of Poetry" and a "Muse out of the world of Dr. Seuss". On March 3, 1973, he wrote his first Poetry Marathon —1,000 poems in 12 hours— at the Grand Opening of Epstein's Bookstore, the literary gathering place in Iowa City in the early seventies. He typed the poems on three small sheets of paper at a time. The shortest was a one-word poem; the longest was a fourteen-line sonnet. The marathon, an Actualist event, took place a week before the first Actualist Convention.

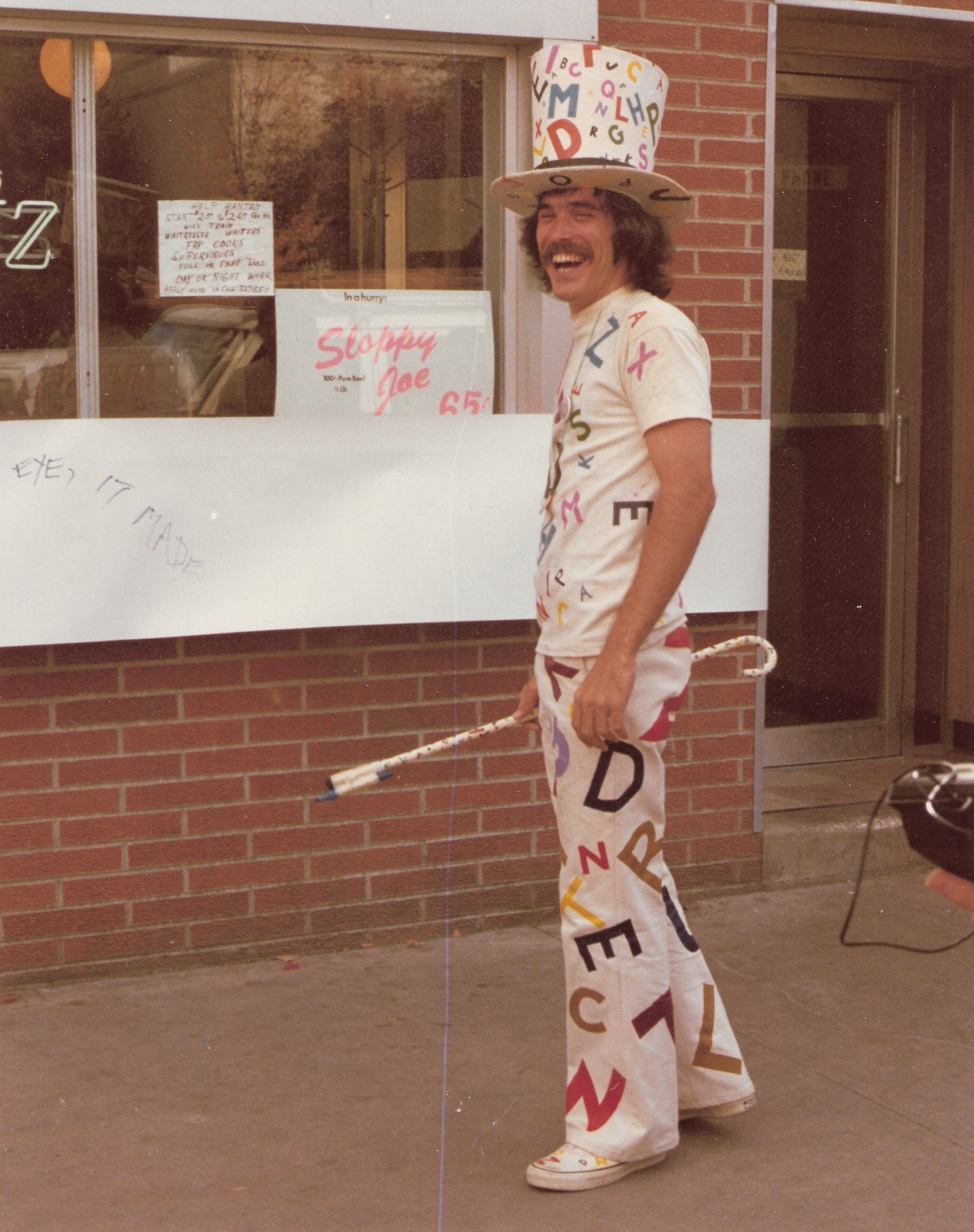
Dr. Alphabet wrapping a city block in poetry

In 1974, Muscatine, IA, held its second annual Great River Days Festival. Part of it was the Belle of the Bend Art Fair. Morice was invited to write a poetry marathon at the fair. Referring back to the 19th century traveling entertainers who went from town to town selling cure-alls and nostrums, he named his event "Dr. Alphabet's Medicine Show." He made a costume to wear for the occasion: a white top hat, shirt, pants, shoes, and cane covered with letters of the alphabet in different colors. During the festival, he wrote a poem on adding machine tape while wrapping it around Joyce Holland. He titled the woman-plus-paper sculpture "The Muscatine Mummy." Shortly after completion, he unwound the poem from Holland, tore it into small strips, and put them into amber glass medicine bottles labeled "Poetry Tonic." He and his assistants gave the souvenir bottles away free to fair-goers.

The biggest Poetry Marathon production of all took place in Lone Tree, IA, in 1977. Sponsored by the Iowa Arts Council and coordinated by music director Lynn Grulke, Halftime Poem Across a Football Field involved two high school football teams, more than 300 people in the stands, a sportscaster, a band, cheerleaders, assistants, Dr. Alphabet, and his sister Michele.

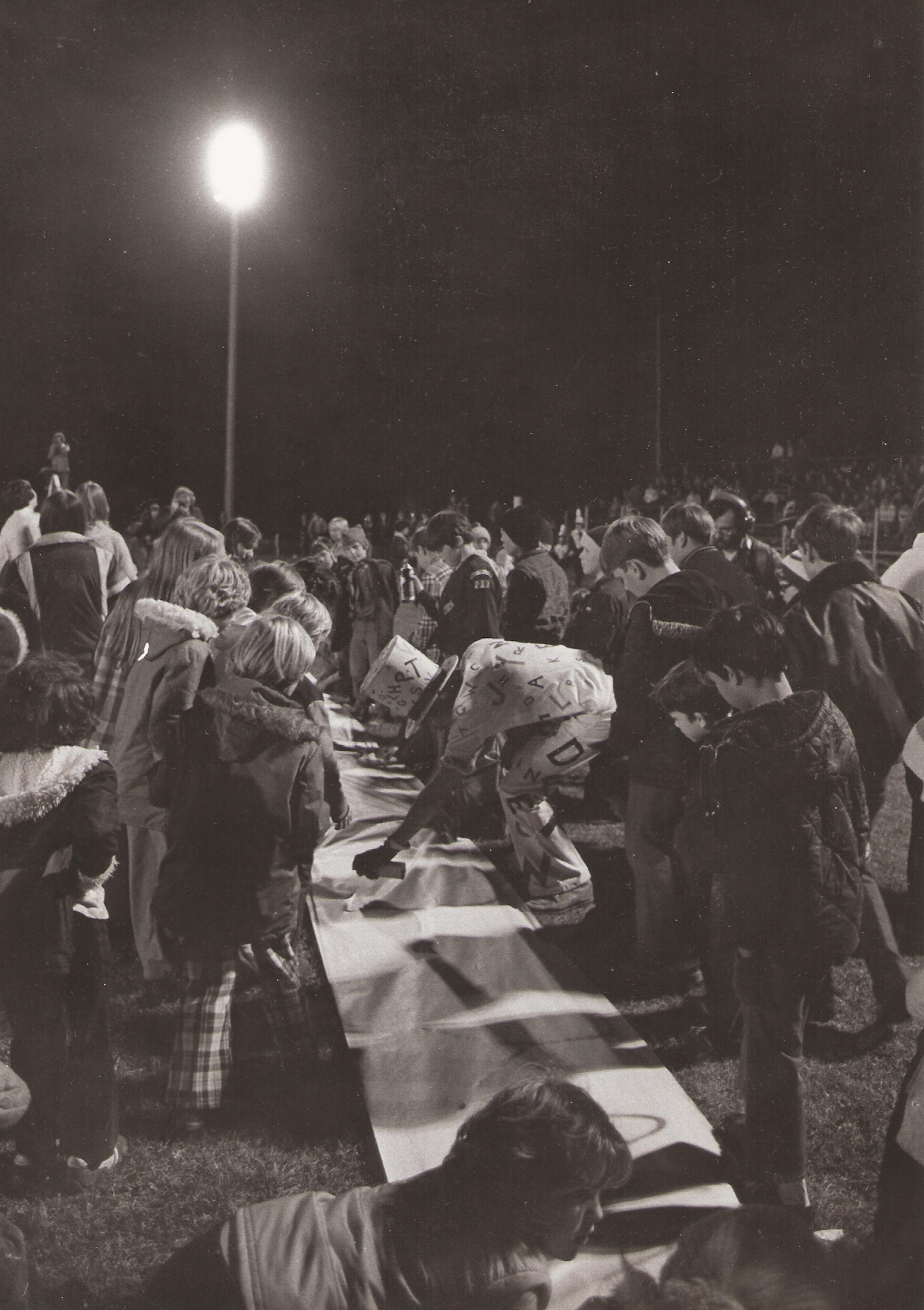
Halftime Poem Across a Football Field

The Lone Tree Lions were playing their homecoming game against the Tigers of Morning Sun, IA. During the day, Morice taught poetry to the students and compared it to football, and the students wrote poetry cheers for the game. After school, the cheerleaders practiced their favorite cheers, while Grulke's band rehearsed a jazzy version of "The Alphabet Song".

That night, during half-time, the band played their song as Morice began to spray paint a poem on a roll of paper that stretched from goal post to goal post. One of his assistants, acting as sportscaster, announced the action over a microphone: "Is that a simile? Yes, it is!" The cheerleaders shouted cheers: "Metaphor! Metaphor! Tell 'em what we're yelling for!" and "Hold that line! Make it rhyme!" and "Hey, hey, Dr. A, how many poems did you write today?"

It was a windy night, and the work-in-progress started blowing across the field. Volunteers had to rush from the stands and stand on the edges of the paper so the writing could continue. When it was finished, the football players held up the 100-yard sheet of paper for the fans to see. Morice read the poem over a microphone. Then the game continued. Lone Tree won.

From July 4 through October 31, 2010, in collaboration with the naming of Iowa City, Iowa, as a UNESCO "City of Literature" (one of only three in the world named by this branch of the United Nations - Edinburgh, Scotland and Melbourne, Australia are the other two), Dave Morice challenged himself to write a world breaking poetry feat. Working in the University of Iowa Main Library, Morice produced 100 pages of poetry for 100 days. This poetry marathon was dedicated to Dave's sister Michele who was his literary cheerleader for many years who died aged 52 on February 22, 2010, of a brain tumor. Working from the assistance of poetry patrons, Morice dedicated 4 months toward creating the ultimate record-breaking feat of writing. Dave's son, Danny, wrote the introduction.

As Dr. Alphabet, Dave Morice has written marathons in Iowa, Pennsylvania, New Jersey, New York, Connecticut, and London, England. In the partial listing below, the name of the marathon event appears in italics, and the title of the actual writing appears in parentheses.

- 1,000 Poems in Twelve Hours (individually titled). Iowa City, IA: Epstein's Bookstore, March 3, 1973.
- 100-Foot Poem from Dawn to Dusk on the Longest Day of the Year (Centipede). Iowa City, IA: Epstein's Bookstore, June 21, 1973.
- Mile-long Haiku (The Kohoutek Comet Poetry Marathon) Iowa City, IA: Epstein's Bookstore, January 15, 1974.
- Tomorrow Show Poetry Telethon: Poem Written on Joyce Holland's Dress (Hot Lights). Los Angeles, CA: Tomorrow show with Tom Snyder, February 12, 1974.
- Poem Wrapping Epstein's Bookstore (Mayday Poetry Panorama). Iowa City, IA: Epstein's Bookstore, May 1, 1974.
- Poem Wrapping Joyce Holland (The Muscatine Mummy). Muscatine, IA, Dr. Alphabet's Medicine Show, at The Belle of the Bend Art Fair, August 24, 1974.
- Week-long Novel (The Great American Novel Marathon). Iowa City, IA: World Writer's Week, October 21–28, 1974.
- Balcony Poem (untitled). Iowa City, IA: Second CHAOS Art Festival, November 24, 1974.
- Poem Wrapping a City Block (Poetry City, U.S.A.). Iowa City, IA: Sculpture Festival, October 6, 1975.
- Poem on Stage (untitled). Iowa City, IA: Duck's Breath Mystery Theater Farewell Show, December 18, 1975.
- Quadrangle Poetry Panorama (untitled). Newton, PA: Buck's County Community College, September 24, 1976.
- Blindfolded Poetry Marathon (The Dark Side). New Hope, PA: New Hope Arts Festival, September 25, 1976.
- Poem Whitewashed on Dubuque St. (Alphabet Avenue). Iowa City, IA: Nonesuch Fair Art Festival, Blackhawk Minipark, April 23, 1977.
- Poem Rising to the Ceiling of the University Recreation Building (Lighter-Than-Air Verse). Iowa City, IA: Nonesuch Fair Celebration of Abilities, April 24, 1977.
- Poem across the Delaware River (Interstate Poem). New Hope, PA: New Hope Arts Festival, April 30, 1977.
- 24-Hour Marathon Poem (untitled). Philadelphia, PA: Philadelphia Community College, April 31, 1977.
- Halftime Poem across a Football Field (The Rhyming Halftime). Lone Tree, IA: Lone Tree High School Homecoming Game, October 28, 1977.
- Poem Wrapping the Musser Public Library (untitled). Muscatine, IA: Muscatine Literary Arts Festival, August 10, 1979.
- The World's Longest Comic Strip (untitled). Iowa City, IA: IMU Bookstore, October 13, 1982.
- 100 Sonnets on a Computer (various titles). London, England: Books Etc., May 12, 1983.

== The World's Largest Book ==
From July 1, 2010, through October 31, 2010, Dave Morice served as a living exhibition for the Celebration of UNESCO naming Iowa City, Iowa as one of three world-wide cities holding the title of "City of Literature".

Within the exhibit of the University of Iowa Libraries, Dave held a place where he wrote a 100-page poem every day for 100 days some chapters inviting guest submissions from businesses, students and other Iowa artists. The marathon was shadowed by an in-live-time website where information about the artist, marathons, a dedication to his sister Michelle, the celebration and "City of Literature" exhibit as well as the history of Actualism was outlined. As each 100 page chapter was completed, a link to a graphic on the website takes the reader to the complete document as written. The final day of the exhibit at the Main Hall of the University of Iowa Libraries, One of the many glass cases featuring Morice's Actualist and Performance poetry history was opened, and Morice put on his original Dr. Alphabet outfit one more time. Dressed as Dr. Alphabet, Morice proceeded to write a five-page epilogue transparent sheets. A reading of the first portion of the 10,000 page marathon was followed by a reading of the epilogue.

After the 2010 display was removed, the University Libraries set forth on the task of taking the massive volume of poetry and binding it for their permanent collection. The final text of 10,119, 8 1/2 by 11 inch pages was printed out by Bu Wilson and bound by Bill Voss of the University of Iowa Libraries. The book took over 24 hours to bind and required a special press to bind all the pages together. The preservation staff are considering submitting "Poetry City Marathon" to the Guinness Book of World Records as the world's thickest book. Morice has been quoted as saying, this was the last of his lifetime of poetry marathons.

== Teaching Methods: The Adventures of Dr. Alphabet ==
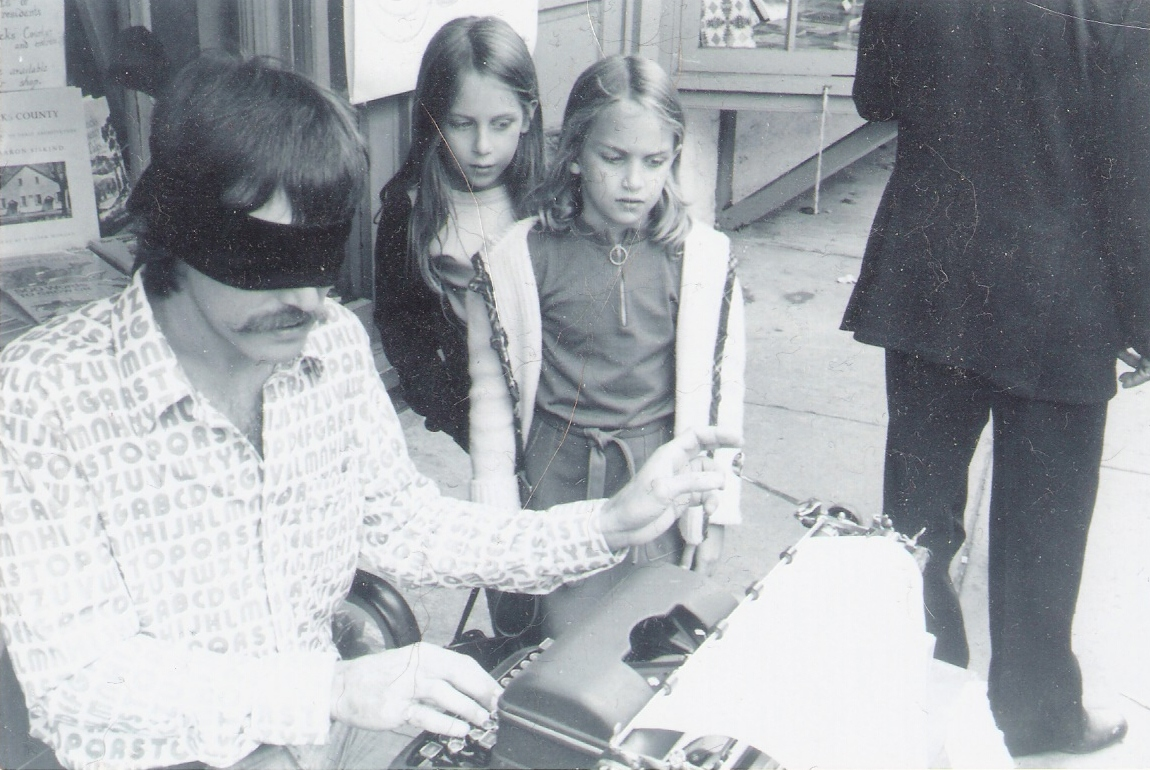
Blindfold Poem

In 1975, Morice began teaching a Poetry Class for People Over 60, funded by the Iowa Arts Council. The hour-long classes, which met twice a week, continued for nine years. The students exhibited three-dimensional poems—Technicolor Pages and Poetry Mobiles—at the Iowa City Public Library, and they published their own magazine, Speakeasy, in four issues.

The arts council also hired him to teach workshops in schools throughout Iowa. Many of his methods involved writing on objects: Mirror Writing, Poetry Lamp, Poetry Robot, Cardboard Castle, Junkosaurus, and others. Some of the methods took other approaches: Poetry Poker used playing cards with phrases on them to include in the poem, and Poem Wrapping the School gave students a chance to write and draw on a long sheet of paper taped around the outside of their school building.

He published his methods in The Adventures of Dr. Alphabet: 104 Unusual Ways to Write Poetry in the Classroom and the Community. Andrei Codrescu discussed the book on National Public Radio's All Things Considered:

"…It is my belief that if Dr. Alphabet's recipes are followed, many of our nation's problems would be solved. Take for instance, 'The Blindfold Poem.' In 1977, Dr. Alphabet wrote blindfolded for 10 hours at an art festival in New Hope, Pennsylvania. He became, he tells us, more aware of sounds, smells, and conversations. Wouldn't it be wonderful if we had a National Writing Blindfolded Day?... The best part is, you don't have to be a kid to play."

=== Poetry Gallery ===
Lin Courchane and Mark Boyd, teachers at Hartford Union High School in Hartford, WI, created a Poetry Gallery inspired by The Adventures of Dr. Alphabet. Their creative writing students made "art object poems" and displayed them in the gallery at school and on the web.

== Poetry Comics ==
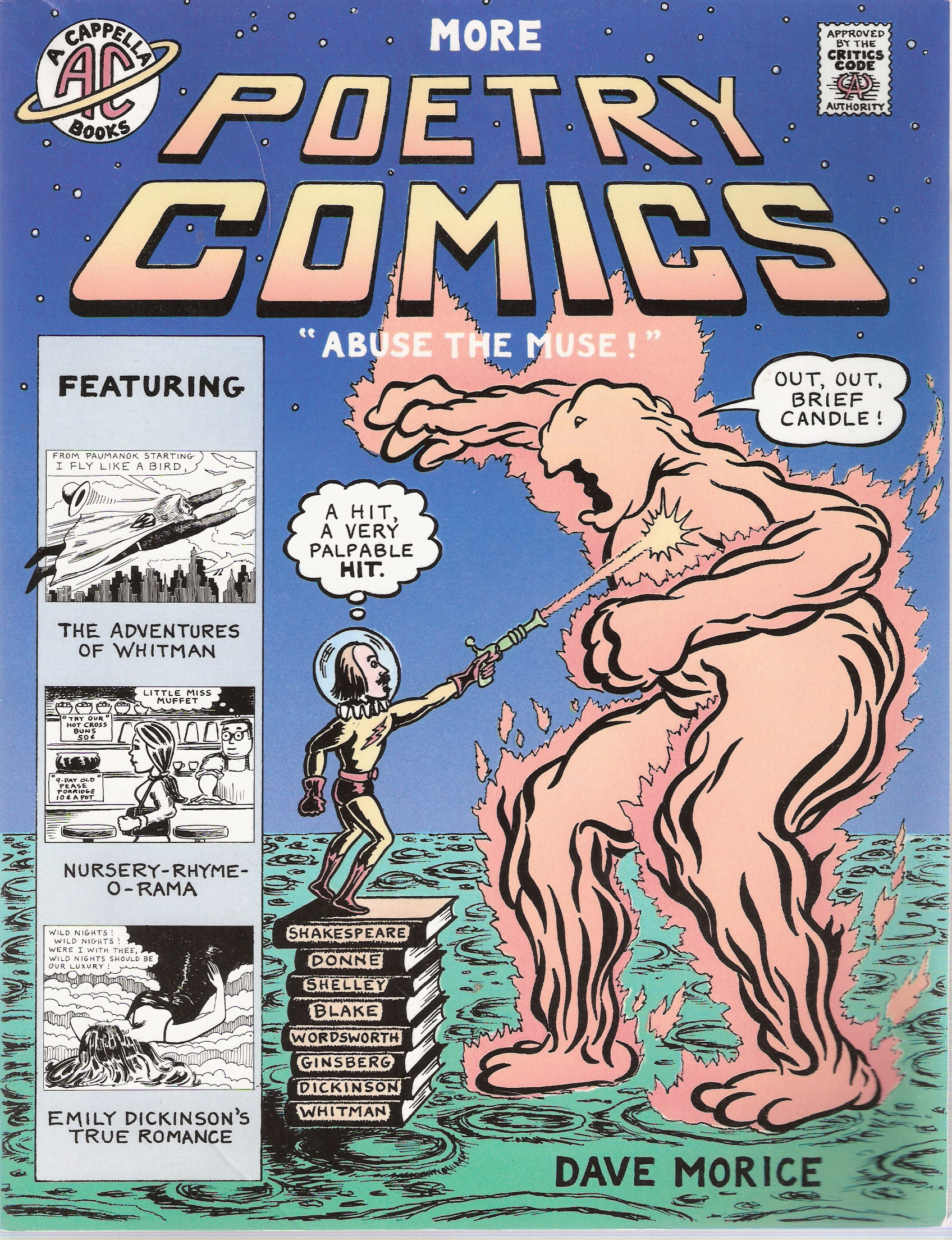
Poetry Comics cover

In 1978, a poet told Morice that "Great poems should paint pictures in the mind." He replied, "Great poems would make great cartoons." "Morice wondered how 'Prufrock' and Sylvia Plath's 'Daddy' would look as comics, so he drew them, publishing 'Daddy' the next year in Poetry Comics No. 1, which he mailed to poets around the country." The words of the poems were placed in cartoon balloons and panels in true comic book format.

From 1979 to 1982, he published 17 issues of Poetry Comics, a 22-page comic book. After issue 16 came out, the Village Voice published a 6-page article about the comics. Journalist Jeff Weinstein wrote: "Morice's inspiration is poetry itself. Poetry makes him want to draw comics."

The article led to a 200-page anthology:

- Poetry Comics: A Cartooniverse of Poems (Simon & Schuster, 1980).

Two more anthologies followed:

- More Poetry Comics: Abuse the Muse (A Cappella/Chicago Review Press, 1994)
- Poetry Comics: An Animiated Anthology (Teachers & Writers, 2002)

"The Muse's Mailbag," a letters-to-the-editor column in Poetry Comics magazine, published comments from readers. Morice sent copies of the magazine to poets and other celebrities, and dozens of people replied. The six responses below appeared in the letters column. They were reprinted on the back cover of the 1980 anthology.

- "Bravo Bravo Bravo" Dick Higgins, writer and publisher
- "The best buy in the universe." Robert Creeley, poet
- "I'll take a lifetime subscription." James Dickey, writer
- "Excellent." Elizabeth Taylor, actress
- "Very funny" George Burns, actor
- "You are the master of a thousand styles." Johnny Hart, cartoonist

=== Hall of Poetry Comics ===
Nancy Barnhart, a Writers-in-the-Schools teacher in Houston, TX, used the idea in her classroom: "In Poetry Comics, Dave Morice demonstrates how to create a 'hybridization' of poem and comic so that students can 'see what they are saying.'" She displayed their works in a Hall of Poetry Comics.

== The Wooden Nickel Art Project ==
In 1985, Morice began The Wooden Nickel Art Project. He ordered 1,000 wooden nickels printed with "Artist's Wooden Nickel" on one side. The other side was left blank. He gave them to friends, relatives, and strangers, and asked them to write or draw whatever they wanted on the blank side and to sign and date the other side. He also sent about 2,000 nickels to well-known people, and 400 responded by decorating their nickels and sending them back. In return, he published a photocopy book titled Catalog of the Wooden Nickel Art Project and sent a copy to each contributor. The collection has been exhibited at The Iowa City Public Library, The Coralville Public Library, and The University of Iowa Credit Union.

Here are 50 of the wooden nickel artists: Muhammad Ali, Isaac Asimov, Pearl Bailey, Milton Berle, Larry Bird, Mel Brooks, Barbara Bush, John Cage, Frank Capra, Johnny Cash, Chevy Chase, Julie Christie, Jamie Lee Curtis, Doris Day, Robert De Niro, Federico Fellini, A.J. Foyt, Lillian Gish, Veronica Hamil, Johnny Hart, Jesse Helms, Bob Hope, Ken Kesey, Henry Kissinger, Burt Lancaster, Spike Lee, Jack Lemmon, Ursula K. Le Guin, Madeleine L'Engle, Sol Le Witt, Willie Mays, Stan Musial, Willie Nelson, Yoko Ono, George Plimpton, Pete Rozelle, Pete Seeger, Dr. Seuss, William Shatner, Frank Sinatra, Ringo Starr, Lily Tomlin, John Travolta, Garry Trudeau, Lana Turner, Johnny Unitas, Kurt Vonnegut, George Wallace, Henry Winkler, and "Weird Al" Yankovic. Charles Manson didn't receive his wooden nickel, so he sent two self-portraits instead, one in black and white, and one in color.

== The Universal Letter ==
In 1974, he designed The Universal Letter, a symbol that has all the letters of the alphabet in it. Allan Kornblum named his business publishing imprint after it, and used it as the logo for two years. In 1991, Morice drew up the images for a Dr. Alphabet token. On one side, it had the Alphabet Hat and the words "Dr. Alphabet / Poetry City, U.S.A." On the other side, it had the symbol and the words "Universal Letter / Good for One Poem." He ordered 2,500 aluminum tokens to give to people. Recipients had the choice of keeping the token or cashing it in for an impromptu poem, rhymed or unrhymed, that he would write on the spot.

== Hyperpoems and Ultranovels ==
From 2000, Morice wrote book-length works that involved literary constraints. Dante scholar and bibliophile George Peyton won an eBay auction to become Morice's patron: He commissioned Morice to rewrite The Divine Comedy in three different verse forms, one for each canticle. The resulting epics were named Limerick Inferno, Haiku Purgatorio, and Clerihew Paradiso.

The Great American Fortune Cookie Novel is a romance made by collaging together more than 2,000 different fortune cookie fortunes to tell the story. Over 500 people donated fortunes to the project, and they are listed in the book as co-authors. Backwords Planet, a sci-fi fantasy novel, is a word-order palindrome in which the words in the first half reverse their order to make the second half. Haloosa Nation, a love story, has four levels of nonsense and uses puns throughout.

== Wordplay ==
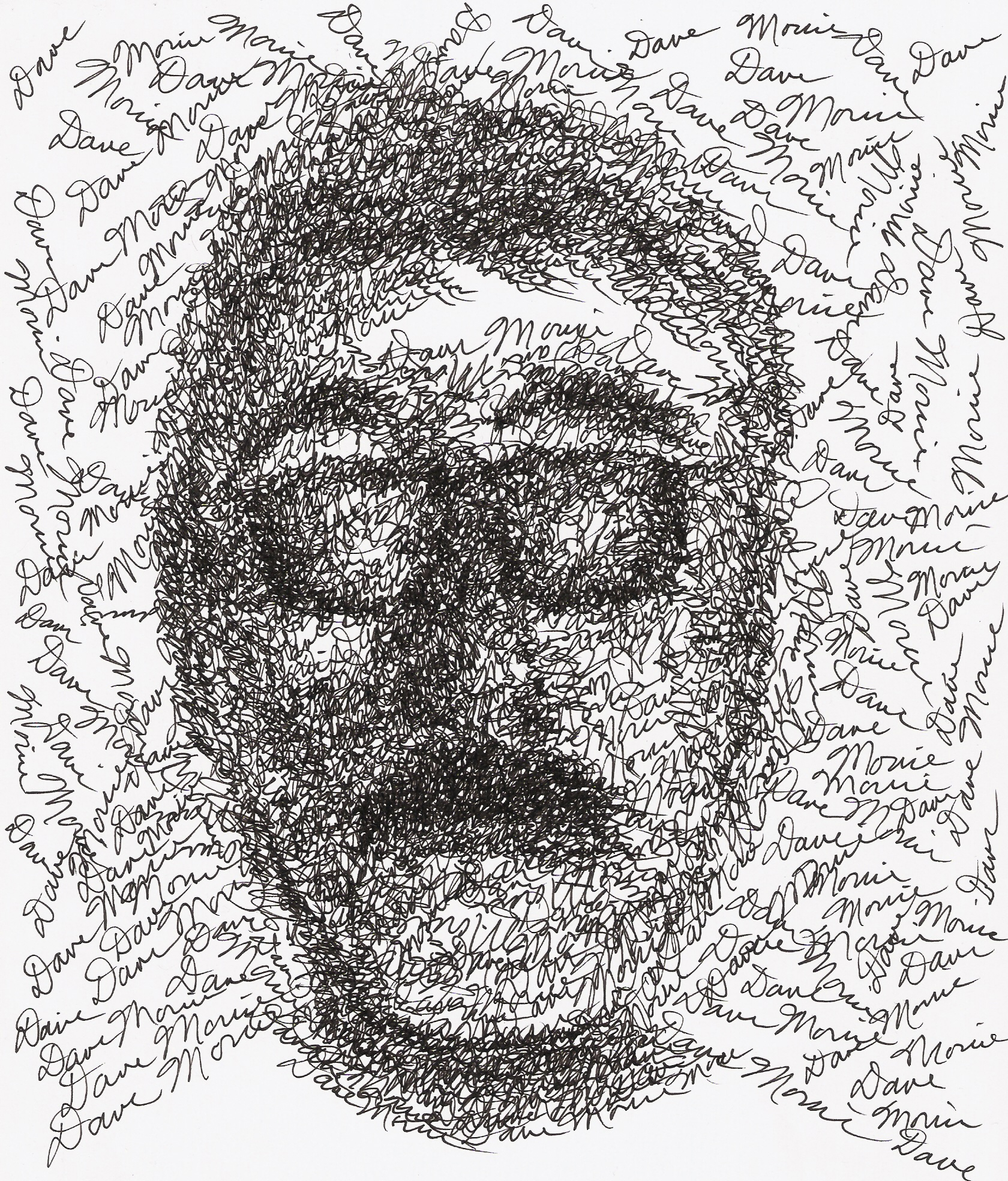
Signature Self-Portrait

In 1987, Morice became the editor of the Kickshaws column in Word Ways, a quarterly magazine of recreational linguistics. In 2006, when he reached his 1,000th page of Kickshaws, he signed his name 1,000 times to make a "signature self-portrait" that was printed on that page in the magazine.

Morice designed three wordplay devices that were introduced in Word Ways. The Lettershift Calculator encodes words according to the ancient Caesar's Code. The Palindromic Slide Rule makes sentences that are palindromes when its parts are properly aligned. The Alphabet Cube, a conceptual machine, shows one way in which palindromes, anagrams, and related letterplay forms can be represented in three-dimensional space. Ross Eckler, Keith Jones, and Grant Willson devised the Word Worm Array, which provides a second way to characterize words in space.

He wrote and published two books on wordplay. Alphabet Avenue uses the metaphor of a city to present in 26 chapters the wordplay of letters, sounds, and meanings. The Dictionary of Wordplay gathers over 2,000 types of word games and wordplay forms into a single volume. In the Times Literary Supplement of London, a reviewer wrote: "The most ingenious publication of the century so far is The Dictionary of Wordplay."

== Artwork ==
Morice's artwork includes pen and ink drawings, pencil drawings, acrylic paintings, acrylic murals, and collages. He has also made artworks using less common methods and materials, such as Painted World Globe, Carved Yoyo, Cut Poker Cards, Pecan Portraits, and others. Scrabble Jacket was made by gluing hundreds of Scrabble tiles to a corduroy sport coat. The World's Tallest Tophat, about 12' high, had pages from The Word Circus, a book he illustrated for author Richard Lederer, glued around it. Rubber Stamp American Gothic was made using a rubber stamp on paper. Often he worked in collaboration with his son using half-painted canvases from Goodwill. Morice's work is exhibited at the Chait Gallery Downtown, located in Iowa City, IA.

The World's Largest Wooden Nickel is his largest work of art. It was planned and assembled in collaboration with Jim Glasgow, an Iowa City contractor, and his construction crew. It is 14 feet 2 inches in diameter, and it weighs more than two tons. Displayed on Glasgow's property, it has become a tourist attraction.

== Multimedia Series ==
In 2005, he began a series of multimedia artworks in which a famous person's image was reconfigured on canvas using a photocopy or printout of the original image along with multiples of a specific object. Tampon Mona Lisa, the first in the series, has 200 tampons glued to the canvas to represent her blouse. He listed the artwork on eBay several times, using the auction site as a gallery. In two consecutive auctions it attracted over 25,000 viewers. WENN (World Entertainment News Network) transmitted a feature about it to news organizations around the world, and articles about Tampon Mona Lisa appeared in Russia, England, Italy, Estonia, The Slovak Republic, Spain, and the United States. Here is a description of four "Off-the-Wall Works":

- Tampon Mona Lisa, 20" x 30", photocopy, tampons, Elmer's glue, 2005.
- Condom Bin Laden, 22" x 28", printout, condoms, organic ash, glue, 2009.
- Picking on Manson, 24" x 36", photocopy, guitar picks, glue, 2009.
- Van Gogh's Ear Trick, 24" x 32", photocopies, plastic ears, band-aids, glue, 2009.

== Published books ==
=== Novels ===
- The Great American Fortune Cookie Novel (illustrated by Daniel J. Erusha). Iowa City, IA: Sackter House Media, 2009.
- Haloosa Nation (illustrated by Danny Morice, introduction by Joyce Holland). Iowa City, IA: JoMo Publishing, 2009.

=== Poetry Books ===
- Poems. Iowa City, IA: Al Buck Press, 1971.
- Tilt (self-illustrated). Iowa City, IA: Toothpaste Press, 1971.
- Paper Comet (self-illustrated). Iowa City, IA: Happy Press, 1974.
- Snapshots from Europe. Iowa City, IA: Toothpaste Press, 1974.
- Jnd-Song of the Golden Gradrti (self-illustrated). Iowa City, IA: Happy Press, 1977.
- Children Learn What They Live (self-illustrated). Iowa City, IA: Happy Press, 1979.
- The Cutist Anthology (self-illustrated). Iowa City, IA: Happy Press, 1979.
- Quicksand Through the Hourglass (self-illustrated). Iowa City, IA: Toothpaste Press, 1979.
- Birth of a Brain / La Creacion de un Cerebro (written and illustrated in collaboration with Steve LaVoie). Iowa City, IA: Happy Press; in conjunction with Cedar Rapids, IA: Black Bart Press, 1985.
- Sacred Clowns, Holy Fools (written in collaboration with Steve Toth). Crescent City, CA: Poetry Vortex Publishing, 2009.
- Poetry City: A Literary Remembrance of Iowa City, Iowa (designed, illustrated and edited by Joye Chizek). Iowa City, IA: JoMo Publishing, 2015

=== Children's books ===
- Dot Town (self-illustrated). Iowa City, IA. Toothpaste Press, 1982.
- The Happy Birthday Handbook (self-illustrated Iowa City, IA: Toothpaste Press, 1982.
- A Visit from St. Alphabet (self-illustrated). Minneapolis, MN: Coffee House Press, 2005.
- The Idiot and the Oddity (self-illustrated) Iowa City, IA: JoMo Publishing, 2010
- The Square, The Circle, and The Ugly Shape (self-illustrated) Iowa City, IA: JoMo Publishing, 2024

=== Poetry Comics: Magazine, Anthologies, and Related Publications ===
- Poetry Comics (magazine). No. 1 to No. 17. Iowa City, IA: Happy Press, 1979–1980.
- Poetry Comics: A Cartooniverse of Poems (first of three anthologies). New York: Simon & Schuster, 1980.
- More Poetry Comics: Abuse the Muse (second anthology). A Cappella/Chicago Review Press, 1994.
- Poetry Comics: An Animated Anthology (third anthology). New York: Teachers & Writers Collaborative, 2002.
- Poetry Comics Postcard Book. New York: Teachers & Writers Collaborative, 2002.
- How to Make Poetry Comics. New York: Teachers & Writers Collaborative, 1984.

=== Books by Other Authors, Illustrated by Morice ===
- Batki, John, The Mad Shoemaker (poems). Iowa City, IA: Toothpaste Press, 1973.
- Kornblum, Cinda, Bandwagon (poems). Iowa City, IA: Toothpaste Press, 1976.
- Kornblum, Allan, Threshold (poems). Iowa City, IA: Toothpaste Press, 1976.
- Hawkins, Bobbie Louise, A Sense of Humor (poems). Minneapolis, MN: Coffee House Press, 1983.
- Batki, John, Why People Lack Confidence in Chairs (poems). Minneapolis, MN: Coffee House Press, 1984.
- Finkel, Edwin, Now We'll Make the Rafters Ring: Classic and Contemporary Rounds for Everyone (music). Chicago, IL: Chicago Review Press,1993.
- Lederer, Richard, Nothing Risque, Nothing Gained: Ribald Riddles, Lascivious Limericks, Carnal Corn, and Other Good, Clean Dirty Fun (humor). Chicago, IL: Chicago Review Press, 1995.
- Lehman, David, The Question of Postmodernism (essay). Spartansburg, SC: Holocene Press, 1995.
- Lederer, Richard. Fractured English (humor). New York, NY: Pocket Books, 1996.
- Lederer, Richard, Pun and Games: Jokes, Riddles, Rhymes, Daffynitions, Tairy Fales, and More Wordplay for Kids (children's book). Chicago, IL: Chicago Review Press, 1996.
- Disch, Tom, A Child's Garden of Grammar (Disch's poems, cartoonized by Morice). Hanover, NH: University Press of New England, 1997.
- Lederer, Richard, The Word Circus (humor). Springfield, MA: Merriam-Webster, 1998.
- Lederer, Richard, The Circus of Words (humor). Chicago, IL: Chicago Review Press, 2001.
- Nicholson, Stuart, Is Jazz Dead? (music). New York, NY: Routledge, 2005.

=== Teaching Manuals ===
- A Tourist's Guide to Computers (self-illustrated). New York, NY: Simon & Schuster, 1982.
- The Adventures of Dr. Alphabet: 104 Unusual Ways to Write Poetry in the Classroom and the Community (self-illustrated). New York, NY: Teachers & Writers Collaborative, 1995.

=== Wordplay Books ===
- Alphabet Avenue: Wordplay in the Fast Lane (self-illustrated). Chicago, IL: Chicago Review Press, 1997.
- The Dictionary of Wordplay (self-illustrated). New York, NY: Teachers & Writers Collaborative, 2001.
- Teachers & Writers Guide to the Dictionary of Wordplay. New York, NY: Teachers & Writers Collaborative, 2001.

=== Catalogs ===
- The Wooden Nickel Art Project: A Catalog of Artists Wooden Nickels (illustrated by others). Iowa City, IA: Happy Press, 1990.
- Catalogue of Poetry Marathons and Other Public Writing Events, Iowa City, IA: IMPA, 1976.

=== Under Pseudonym of Joyce Holland ===
- The Tenth J (minimal poem). Iowa City, IA: Toothpaste Press, 1972.
- Matchbook: Magazine of 1-Word Poetry. Iowa City, IA: X Press, 1973–74.
- The Light Switch (minimal play), first produced in Iowa City, IA, at Wesley House Auditorium, 1974.
- Alphabet Anthology (one-letter poems). Iowa City, IA: X Press, 1973.
- The Final E (concrete and minimal poems): Iowa City, IA: X Press, 1979.
- Matchbook Magazine Anthology (one-word poems from Matchbook). Iowa City, IA. X Press, 2009.
- Concrete Blocks: An Anagram Love Story (pattern poems): Iowa City, IA: JoMo Publishing, 2010.

=== Under Pseudonym of Dr. Alphabet ===
- Poetry City, U.S.A. (mile-long poem). Iowa City, IA: Happy Press, 1977.

== Other works ==
=== Comic Books (Periodicals) ===
- Dada Comix. Iowa City, IA: Happy Press, 1978.
- Phooey (with other cartoonists). Iowa City, IA: Iowa City Cartoonists Collective, 1983–84.

=== Stageplays ===
- The Umbrella That Predicted the Future (three-act play), first produced in Iowa City, IA, at Wesley House Auditorium, 1974.
- A Light Draw (one-act puppet play), first produced in Iowa City, IA, at The Mill, 1975.
- The Coca-Cola War (one-act mime play), first produced in Iowa City, IA, on Dubuque St., during the Nonesuch Fair, 1977.
- Stargazers (one-act play), first produced in Iowa City, at The Wheel Room, 1977.
- The Naked Stage (one-act play), first produced in Iowa City, IA, at The Mill, 1982.

== Works cited ==
- Hedblad, Alan, ed., Something About the Author, Vol. 93. Detroit, MI: Gale, 1997.
- Kostelanetz, Richard, ed., A Dictionary of the Avant-Gardes. New York, NY: Schirmer Books, 2000.
- Morice, Dave, ed., The Wooden Nickel Art Project: A Catalog of Artists Wooden Nickels, Iowa City, IA: Happy Press, 1990.
- Morice, Dave, ed., Catalogue of Poetry Marathons and Other Public Writing Events, Iowa City, IA: IMPA, 1976.
- Morris, Richard, "Who Are the Greatest Poets?" In Higgins et al., The Word and Beyond. New York, NY: The Smith, 1982.
- Lehman, David, ed., Ecstatic Occasions, Expedient Forms (essays on poetry). New York, NY: Macmillan, 1987.
- Edgar, Christopher and Ron Padgett, eds., Educating the Imagination, Vol. 2. New York, NY: Teachers & Writers, 1994.
- Morice, Dave, The Adventures of Dr. Alphabet. New York, NY: Teachers & Writers Collaborative, 1995.
