= Ordbogen.com =

Danish online education and language technology company

- Company type: Private
- Website type: Dictionary
- Available in: Danish
- Founded: December 19, 2001
- Headquarters: Odense, Denmark
- Key people: Bjarni Norddahl (Chairman, Partner); Michael Walther (IT Director, Partner); Peter Revsbech (Adm. Director / CEO)
- Industry: Reference/Education
- Website: Ordbogen.com
- Advertising: none
- Launched: August 2003; November 1, 2006 (relaunch)

Ordbogen A/S is an online education and language technology company located in Odense, Denmark. It is Denmark's largest web-based dictionary company, with more than 100 digital dictionaries and 1+ million article searches per day. The name Ordbogen means the dictionary in Danish.

Ordbogen A/S itself comprises several products: Two dictionary sites, Ordbogen.com and the forthcoming international site Lemma.com, and two online teaching resources Grammatip.com (grammar and spelling) and Educas.com, (all subjects of the Danish school system, 1st-10th grade). Ordbogen.com, Grammatip.com and Educas.com are all aimed at the Danish market, whereas Lemma.com targets the international market with dictionaries written in 45 languages. As of May 2016, the company has grown to more than 100 employees (with the goal of recruiting 30 more by 2017). Ordbogen has employees spanning 15 nationalities, who speak 20 different languages. The company was awarded six consecutive Børsen Gazelle Awards (2008-2013), which are awarded to the fastest growing companies in Denmark.

== History and Evolution ==
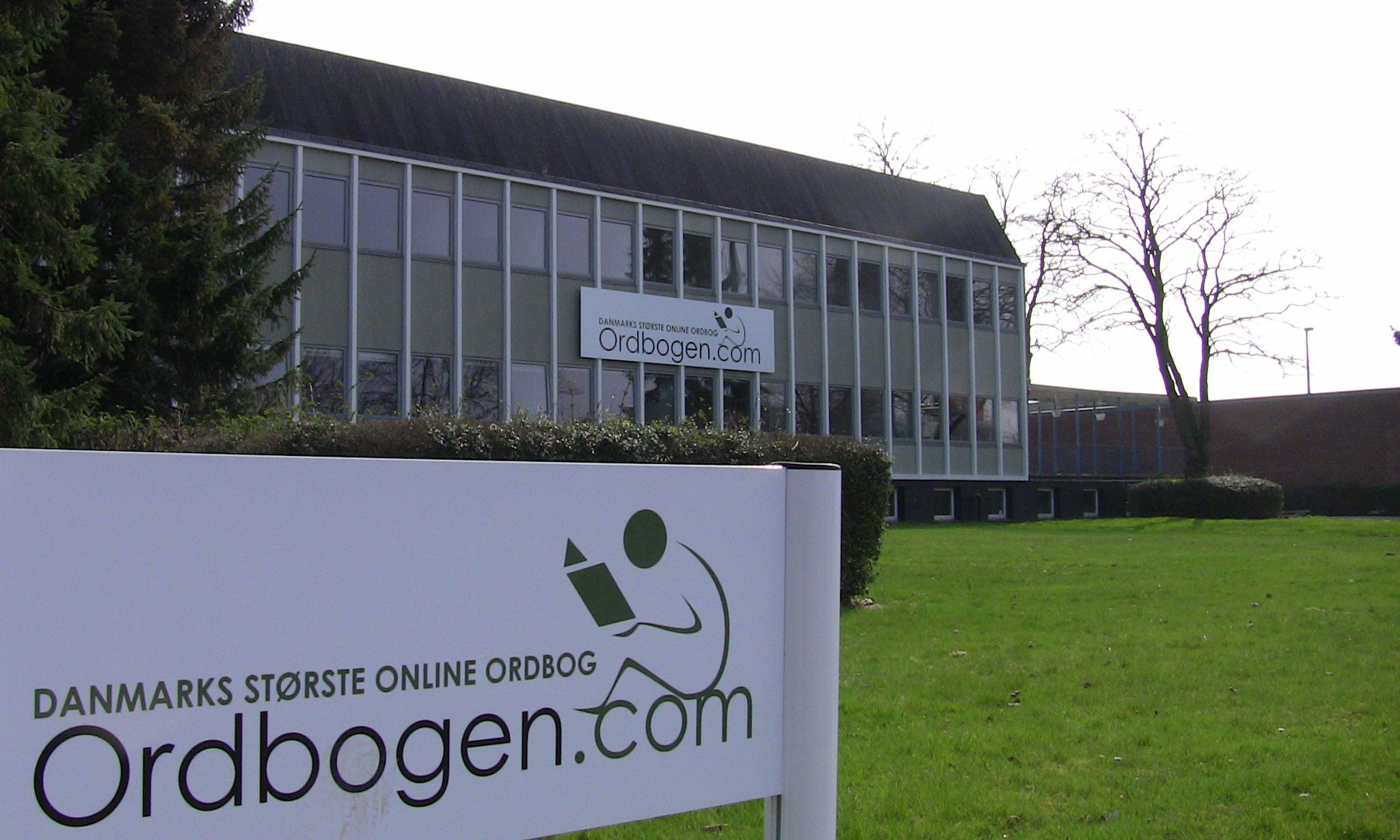
The Ordbogen.com headquarters in Odense.

=== Origins ===
In 2001, Michael Walther, Bjarni Norddahl, Thomas Thomsen, and Jacob Hatt founded the company Cool Systems ApS. Their associated website, coolsms.dk became one of the biggest websites in Denmark at that point in time, with 266,000 visits a day. The website allowed people to send text messages online at a lower price than the telephone companies’ usual price. Shortly after the release of coolsms.dk, Thomas Thomsen and Jacob Hatt left the company. In 2003, the remaining founders, Michael Walther and Bjarni Norddahl, went on to change Cool Systems ApS to Ordbogen ApS, and later, converted to a public limited liability company - Ordbogen A/S. 2003 was also the year when Ordbogen A/S released Ordbogen.com - the first subscription-based dictionary website in Denmark, offering easy access to a high-quality Danish-English/English-Danish dictionary, edited by Jørgen Rohde, translator and editor.

By 2005, the company replaced the previous dictionary with a new version tailored for web use, which was the company's first self-produced dictionary. That same year, Ordbogen also became strategic partners with the Centre for Lexicography at Aarhus University in order to publish their dictionary Den Danske Netordbog (Engl.: “the Danish Internet Dictionary”).

A year later, in 2006, Ordbogen A/S released their second bilingual and self-produced dictionary, Danish-German/German-Danish.

=== 2008-2013 ===
During this period, Ordbogen received the Børsen Gazelle award six years in a row. In 2010, Ordbogen acquired the online grammar teaching system Grammatip, and that same year they entered into another strategic partnership with the publishers JP/Politikens Hus, followed by the Danish Language Council, Dansk Sprognævn, in 2011.

In 2012, Grammatip was merged with Ordbogen A/S. This was also the year that the online school platform Educas was launched. Educas had developed from Vikartimen, a teachers’ resource previously bought by Ordbogen A/S, whose name and concept were changed and further digitised.

2012 was also the year that Ordbogen became strategic partners with Oxford Dictionaries as well as German publishers Duden Schulbuch and Cornelsen Verlag, while 2013 was the year work started on Lemma.com.

=== 2013-present ===
In recent years, Ordbogen.com has undergone significant development, and in 2016 many new additions to the staff were made. Ordbogen is currently in the process of expanding to international markets through their development of an international version of Ordbogen.com, the site Lemma.com.

== Products ==
=== Ordbogen.com ===
Ordbogen's flagship product is Ordbogen.com which, due to its international collaboration, makes Ordbogen.com the largest dictionary website in Denmark. Ordbogen has more than 100 dictionaries including:

- Danish
- English
- German
- French
- Spanish
- Arabic
- Estonian
- Chinese

And other dictionaries such as:

- Synonym
- Orthography
- Foreign words

And also dictionaries within such fields and subjects as:

- Lego
- Wind energy
- Music
- Internet
- Automotive engineering

=== Ordbogen App ===
The app Ordbogen Online offers the same services as the website.

=== Grammatip.com ===
Grammatip is an online educational tool for teaching Danish, English, German and French grammar and spelling to Danish elementary and secondary school children as well as to adults and foreigners. It is a dynamic product as new assignments are added to it every week. Users have the opportunity to suggest changes and edits, which Grammatip then incorporates when creating new categories and exercises. Grammatip covers several exercises such as:

- Danish spelling
- Spelling tests
- Dictations
- Danish reading tests

=== Educas.com ===
Educas is a web-based educational portal with thousands of exercises for all mandatory subjects and interdisciplinary themes for the public Danish elementary and secondary level school system (the “folkeskole”). The site is updated daily with new exercises. Educas.com and Grammatip.com are both online resources, and assignments are both given and completed online. Educas allows teachers to apply the site as a digital ”blackboard”, and several times a year theme weeks are held that combine school topics with current events. The assignments are searchable through the Danish “Fælles Mål” (Engl. “common goals”), which are the official competence goals for the different school subjects at different grade levels of the “folkeskole”. Folkeskole courses include:

- Danish
- English
- German OR French
- Mathematics
- Physics
- History

=== Lemma.com ===
Lemma is the international version of Ordbogen.com and is currently under development. It will offer dictionaries from Ordbogen.com as well as from publishers such as Oxford Duden, Duden Verlag, K Dictionaries, and Cornelsen Verlag. Lemma will offer a lot of the same dictionaries as Ordbogen, but with such additions as:

- Hebrew
- Urdu
- Hindi
- Czech
- Vietnamese

== Achievements ==
Ordbogen was awarded as a Gazelle company 6 years in a row (2008, 2009, 2010, 2011, 2012 and 2013) by the Danish business newspaper Børsen. The Gazelle award is given to Denmark's fastest growing companies. A gazelle is defined as a company which: "[...] has achieved a continuous growth in revenue or gross profit for the last four financial years, and which has, in total, more than doubled the revenue or the gross profit in the period".

In 2013, Ordbogen set a Guinness World Record for world's largest dictionary, with a book measuring 4.62 m (15 ft 1.89 in) and 89,471 pages. The book encompasses the 46 dictionaries which were available on www.ordbogen.com at the time.
