= Small Press Expo =

Annual comic book convention in Maryland, US

- Status: Active
- Genre: Alternative comics
- Location: Bethesda, Maryland
- Country: United States
- Inaugurated: 1994; 32 years ago
- Founders: Jon Cohen, Lou Danoff, Joel Pollack
- Most recent: Sep 12–13, 2026
- Executive Director: Warren Bernard
- Organizer: SPX: The Small Press Expo
- Filing status: Not-for-profit
- Website: www.smallpressexpo.com

The Small Press Expo (SPX) is an American alternative comics convention. A registered 501(c)(3) that was created in 1994, every year since its inception, SPX has put on a festival, known as The Expo, that provides a forum for artists, writers and publishers of comic art in its various forms to present their creations to the public and to expose the public to comic art not normally accessible through normal commercial channels. The annual SPX festival is typically held in the fall in Bethesda, Maryland. SPX is unique amongst the various comic conventions as it does not allow retailers to have a formal presence at the convention. Only creators and publishers are allowed to set up at the festival, although retailers can and do attend the show with the general public through paid admissions.

SPX is the home of the Ignatz Awards, which have been presented there annually since 1997. As one of the few festival awards rewarded in comics, they are voted on by attendees.

SPX is closely associated with the Comic Book Legal Defense Fund (CBLDF). A portion of the profits from the annual SPX festival including fundraising activities that take place during the convention weekend, go to the CBLDF. From 1997 to 2000, as well as in 2002 and 2004, SPX was held in conjunction with the International Comics and Animation Festival (ICAF).

== History ==
SPX was founded in 1994 by three Washington-Baltimore area retailers — "Jon Cohen (Beyond Comics), Lou Danoff (Zenith Comics), and [Joel Pollack (Big Planet Comics)] — with [the] moral support (and... feedback) of Dave Sim (Cerebus) and Jeff Smith (Bone)" — to promote diversity in the comics marketplace. (The first SPX also coincided with Sim's "Spirits of Independence" tour.)

Chris Oarr was one of the key figures responsible for shaping SPX into a major independent comics event during its formative years. A former comics retailer and publicist, Oarr became the executive director of SPX in the mid-1990s, shortly after its 1994 founding. Under his leadership, the show expanded in scope and professionalism, developing a stronger national profile and more organized infrastructure. Oarr also helped establish SPX’s reputation as a creator-centered, noncommercial alternative to mainstream conventions — promoting the ethos of self-publishing, artistic independence, and community that continues to define the event. Under Oarr's leadership, SPX adopted many of its enduring features, including the Sunday picnic and softball game and the introduction of the Ignatz Awards, created to honor outstanding achievement in small-press and self-published comics.

Profits from at least the 1995 and 1996 shows were earmarked for the Comic Book Legal Defense Fund. Attendees of the early years often speak of the close-knit community that was attained during the convention, citing offbeat occurrences such as James Kochalka's nude musical performance in 1998 and the annual pig roast/picnic/softball game.

The show expanded from a one-day affair to three days in 1997, reverting back to two days in 1998, and then remaining a three-day event from 1999 through 2004.

In 2001, both the Expo and ICAF, scheduled for September 14–16, were canceled due to creators' travel difficulties related to the September 11, 2001 attacks. The so-called SP-Xiles event was held on September 16 in Brooklyn, New York, to in some ways replace the canceled Expo; it raised $1,925.00 for the American Red Cross and the New York Fire Fighter's 9-11 Relief Fund.

In 2005, the show returned to a Saturday-Sunday event, a format it has retained every since.

In 2011 SPX began a new charitable initiative, the Graphic Novel Gift Program. Through this initiative, SPX purchases graphics novels on behalf of a local library system, as selected from a list of works from participating publishers. SPX provides participating libraries with a pull list and a budget. The selected books are provided to the library as a gift of the Small Press Expo. For the program's first year, which featured donations to the Montgomery City-County Public Library, artist Lilli Carré created a special bookplate that was included with each volume provided.

Also in 2011, SPX established a partnership with the Library of Congress to create the Small Press Expo Collection, an archival initiative preserving the festival’s history and representative works from the independent comics community. The collection includes Ignatz Award nominees, original art, and promotional materials, and is regarded as the first programmatic institutional effort to document contemporary small-press comics in the United States.

The 2020 edition of the show, scheduled to be held September 12–13, was canceled due to the COVID-19 pandemic; the Ignatz Awards ceremony was held online. The 2021 edition of the show was also held entirely online.

=== Event dates and locations ===
- 1994: June 10 — Bethesda Ramada Inn, Bethesda, Maryland
- 1995: June 23 — Bethesda, Maryland
- 1996: September 21 — Holiday Inn Select, Bethesda, Maryland
- 1997: September 19–21 — Quality Hotel, Silver Spring, Maryland
- 1998: September 26–27 — Holiday Inn Select, Bethesda, Maryland
- 1999: September 17–19 — Holiday Inn Select, Bethesda, Maryland
- 2000: September 15–17 — Holiday Inn Select, Bethesda, Maryland
- ~~2001: September 14–16 — Bethesda, Maryland~~ — cancelled because of 9/11 attacks
- 2002: September 6–8 — Bethesda Holiday Inn, Bethesda, Maryland
- 2003: September 5–7 — Holiday Inn Select, Bethesda, Maryland
- 2004: October 1–3 — Holiday Inn Select Bethesda, Bethesda, Maryland
- 2005: September 23–24 — Holiday Inn Select Bethesda, Bethesda, Maryland
- 2006: October 13–14 — Bethesda North Marriott Hotel & Conference Center, North Bethesda, Maryland
- 2007: October 12–13 — Bethesda North Marriott Hotel & Conference Center, North Bethesda, Maryland
- 2008: October 4–5 — Bethesda North Marriott Hotel & Conference Center, North Bethesda, Maryland
- 2009: September 26–27 — Bethesda North Marriott Hotel & Conference Center, North Bethesda, Maryland
- 2010: September 11–12 — Bethesda North Marriott Hotel & Conference Center, North Bethesda, Maryland
- 2011: September 10–11 — Bethesda North Marriott Hotel & Conference Center, North Bethesda, Maryland
- 2012: September 15–16 — Bethesda North Marriott Hotel & Conference Center, North Bethesda, Maryland
- 2013: September 14–15 — Bethesda North Marriott Hotel & Conference Center, North Bethesda, Maryland
- 2014: September 13–14 — Bethesda North Marriott Hotel & Conference Center, North Bethesda, Maryland
- 2015: September 19–20 — Bethesda North Marriott Hotel & Conference Center, North Bethesda, Maryland
- 2016: September 17–18 — Bethesda North Marriott Hotel & Conference Center, North Bethesda, Maryland
- 2017: September 16–17 — Bethesda North Marriott Hotel & Conference Center, North Bethesda, Maryland
- 2018: September 15–16 — Bethesda North Marriott Hotel & Conference Center, North Bethesda, Maryland
- 2019: September 14–15 — Bethesda North Marriott Hotel & Conference Center, North Bethesda, Maryland
- ~~2020: September 12–13 — Bethesda North Marriott Hotel & Conference Center, North Bethesda, Maryland~~ — cancelled due to COVID-19 pandemic.
- 2021: September 18–19 — entire convention held online due to COVID-19 pandemic
- 2022: September 17–18 — Bethesda North Marriott Hotel & Conference Center, North Bethesda, Maryland
- 2023: September 9–10 — Bethesda North Marriott Hotel & Conference Center, North Bethesda, Maryland
- 2024: September 14–15 — Bethesda North Marriott Hotel & Conference Center, North Bethesda, Maryland
- 2025: September 13–14 — Bethesda North Marriott Hotel & Conference Center, North Bethesda, Maryland
- 2026: September 12–13 — Bethesda North Marriott Hotel & Conference Center, North Bethesda, Maryland

== Leadership ==
- 1994 — Lou Danoff and Jon Cohen
- 1995–1997 — Chris Oarr
- 1998–fall 2000 — Michael Zarlenga (Note: The SPX steering committee for the 1998 festival: Michael Zarlenga, Mark Wheatley, Joel Pollack, Chris Oarr, Greg McElhatton, Lou Danoff, Jon Cohen, Greg Bennett, and Jeff Alexander.)
- fall 2000–Jan. 2001 — Christian Panas
- Jan. 2001–Dec. 2003 — Greg McElhatto and Greg Bennett — McElhatton involved with running SPX "from 1997 to 2012, and [was] the head of the Ignatz Awards from 2007 to 2010."
- 2004–2006 — Steve Conley
- 2007–2009 — Karon Flage
- 2010 — Jeff Alexander (served as Assistant Executive Director from 2007 to 2009)
- 2011–present — Warren Bernard (became Assistant Executive Director in 2010)

== SPX Anthology ==
From 1997 to 2005, an annual anthology was published as a companion to the convention. Profits from sales of the anthologies were given to the Comic Book Legal Defense Fund (CBLDF). Frequent contributors included Josh Neufeld, Ron Regé Jr., Nick Bertozzi, Tony Consiglio, Dean Haspiel, James Kochalka, Alex Robinson, and R. Sikoryak. The first SPX anthology (1997) was published in standard comic format, while all subsequent editions were in digest format. Originally published by SPX itself, the CBLDF took over the publication of the anthology with the 2002 edition. SPX 2002, on the theme of biographies, was given the 2003 Eisner Award for Best Anthology. The anthology was discontinued as an annual production after 2005.

Issue	Year	Editor	Cover Artist	Contributors	No. of pages	Notes
Small Press Expo: SPX '97	1997	Chris Oarr	Frank Cho (flip cover by James Sturm)	Charles Vess, Frank Cho, Linda Medley, Marc Hempel, Mark Wheatley, Rob Walton, Jessica Abel, Art Baxter, Donna Barr, Ruben Bolling, Ed Brubaker, Ivan Brunetti, Joe Chiappetta, Brian Clopper, Roberta Gregory, Donna Barr, Tony Consiglio, Paul Grist, Allan Gross, Tom Hart, Dean Haspiel, Sam Henderson, James Kochalka, David Lasky, Jon Lewis, Jason Lutes, Matt Madden, Josué Menjivar, Josh Neufeld, Dan Parsons, Jesse Reklaw, Chris Staros, James Sturm, Colin Upton, Charles Vess, Shannon Wheeler, Mack White, Joe Zabel	128 pp.	
Small Press Expo: SPX '98	1998	Chris Oarr	James Kochalka and Jeff Smith	Pete Sickman-Garner, Ivan Brunetti, Alex Robinson, Steve Fiorilla, Jen Sorensen, Marc Hempel, Steven Weissman, Nick Bertozzi, Bob Fingerman, Tom Hart, Alex, Bill Weaver, Chris Staros, Dean Haspiel, Actus Tragicus, Jason Little, Ted Rall, Jeff Mason, Josh Neufeld, Joe Chiappetta, Ron Regé Jr., Megan Kelso, Dylan Horrocks, Steve Conley, J. Torres, Tim Levins, Jeff Wasson, Frank Cho, Michael Cohen, Brian Clopper, Mark Wheatley, Allan Gross, Damon Willis, Joe Zabel, Stephen Blue, Robert Boyd	184 pp.	
Small Press Expo: SPX99	1999	Chris Oarr and Brian Clopper (Coordinators)	Matt Wagner	Chris Staros, Rich Tommaso, Tony Consiglio, Jay Hosler, Ron Regé Jr., Joe Chiappetta, James Kochalka, Matt Feazell, Josh Simmons, Brian Clopper, Ted Tucker, Nick Bertozzi, Bob Fingerman, Jim Mahfood, Alex Robinson, Dean Haspiel, Jon Hastings, Joe Zabel, John Gallagher, Pete Sickman-Garner, Eric Reynolds, Dave Roman, John Green, Rich Koslowski, Chris Shadolan, Chris Yambar, Jordan Crane, R. Walker, Josh Neufeld, Bruce Mutard, Jim Kirkland, Nathan Macdicken, Mark A. W. Jackson, Jason Little, Clayton Noone, Stefan Neville, Dan Strachota, Gregory Cook, Brian Ralph, Rachel Hartman, Vince Sneed, Aaron McClellan, J. Torres, Tim Levins, Rich Henn, Cayetano, Frosty, Steve Conley, Mark Wheatley	200 pp.	
Expo 2000	2000	Tom Devlin, Chris Oarr, Christian Panas, Jeff Alexander, Karon Flage, Greg McElhatton, and Charles Brownstein	Charles Burns	David B., Marc Bell, Charles Berberian, Nick Bertozzi, Chris Bleistein & Chris Shadoian, Mike Brennan, Mat Brinkman, Ivan Brunetti, Mark Burrier, Timomir Chelanovich, David Choe, Chris Cilla & Zak Sally, Tony Consiglio, Greg Cook, Jim Drain, Philippe Dupuy, Tom Galambos, Daniel Gallant, Leif Goldberg, Dean Haspiel, Ben Jones, Megan Kelso, Killoffer, James Kochalka, David Lasky, Jon Lewis & Tom Hart, Darko Macan, Ted May & Warren Craghead, Dave Mazure, Jean-Christophe Menu, Sasha Mihajlowich, Scott Mills, Leland Myrick & Mark Dos Santos, R. Walker & Josh Neufeld, Jim Ottaviani & Rick Veitch, Michael Patrick, John Porcellino, Ansis Purins, Brian Ralph, Ron Regé Jr., Jesse Reklaw, Eric Reynolds, Alex Robinson, Johnny Ryan, Kevin Scalzo, Seth, P. Shaw, Ted Stearn, Cat Sullivan, Craig Thompson, Adrian Tomine, J. Torres & Jason B., Lewis Trondheim, Sean Wang, Chris Ware, Daniel Warner, Kurt Wolfgang	352 pp.	
Expo 2001	2001	Charles Brownstein, Tom Devlin, Abe Foreu, Chris Oarr, and the SPX Steering Committee	Daniel Clowes	Art Spiegelman, Marc Bell, Blutch, Martin Cendreda, Renée French, John Kerschbaum, Dave Kiersh, James Kochalka, Roger Langridge, Jon Lewis, Matt Madden, pshaw, Ron Regé Jr., Johnny Ryan, Jen Sorensen, Jef Czekaj, Sam Henderson, Craig Bostick & Jon Hetman, Austin McKinley, Mark Laliberte, Mark David Nevins, Jeremy McFarren, Chris Staros & Bo Hampton, Dean Haspiel, Krysten Siebecker & Alex Robinson, Charles Brownstein, Daniel Warner, Frank Cammuso, Graham Annable, Dan Zettwoch, Pete Sickman-Garner, Jen Sorensen, Jimmy Palmiotti, Derek McCulloch & Rik Livingston, David Lasky, R. Sikoryak, Greg Cook, Sebastian Frey, Arthur Dela Cruz, Fabio, Paul Hornschemeier, Garrett Izumi, Alison Elizabeth Taylor, John Hankiewicz, Eric Reynolds, Willem, Ben Catmull, Mike Battaglia, Chris Forgues, Ben Jones, Warren Craghead, Mike Lowery, Robyn Chapman, Thomas Ott, Andy Ristaino	380 pp.	Published despite the cancellation of the 2001 festival after the September 11 attacks.
SPX 2002	2002		David Mazzucchelli	Chris Pitzer, Joel Priddy, Diana Tamblyn, Laurenn McCubbin, Matt Kindt, R. Sikoryak, David Lasky & Deborah Siegal, Jim Ottaviani, Rachel Hartman, Damien Jay, Ben Jones, Josh Simmons, Geoffrey Hawley, Sevilla King, Pablo Garcia Callejo, Nicky B., Mike Lowery, Tony Consiglio, Jeff Sharp, Paul Hornschemeier, Chris Cilla, Chandler, Dave Delap, Martin Cendreda, Evan Forsch, Bruce Mutard, Aaron Renier, Alison Taylor, Jonathan Bennett, Matthew Wiegle, Clayton Noone & Stefan Neville, Don MacDonald, Lance Simmons, M. Campos, Ellen Lindner & M. Swartz, Ansis Purins & Jon Natchez, Nathan Beaty, Robert Ullman, Jamie Tanner, Jeremy Smith, Scott Faulkner, Jess Fink, Dan Hernandez, Joyce Brabner & Josh Neufeld, Tor Aerlig, Tod Parkhill, Cole Johnson, Joshua Delashmutt, Ron Regé Jr.	312 pp.	Theme: biographical comics; Comic Book Legal Defense Fund (CBLDF) takes over publication of the title. Won 2003 Eisner Award for Best Anthology
SPX 2003 Anthology	2003	Greg Bennett, Charles Brownstein, Greg McElhatton, and Chris Pitzer	Jaime Hernandez	Adam Sacks, Bryan Lee O'Malley, Jess Fink, Dan Hernandez, Sharon Furgason, Metaphrog, Josh Neufeld, Miriam Katin, Justin Hall, R. Sikoryak, Joel Priddy, Eve Englezos & Joshua Moutray, Matthew Bogart, Ken Bosom, Jeff Sharp, Andrea Gurney, Neelam Azora, Mike Lowery, Shane Durgee, Karl Kirsch & Brendan Fletcher, Tom Neely, Carl Mitsch, Melanie Lewis, Brian Musikoff, Jacob Steingroot, Rob G., Michael G. Sivak, R. Kikuo Johnson, Joseph Holsapple, Jamie Tanner, Corey Ross, Nate Neal, Travis Nichols, Doug Olsen, Gareth Hinds, Parrish Baker, Marc Bryant & Malcolm Jones, Bryant Paul Johnson, Chris Radtke & Mike Dawson, Ryan Browne, Shawn Cheng, Shannon Brady, Robert Bienvenu, Peter S. Conrad	290 pp.	Theme: Travel comics
SPX 2004: A Sequential Arts War Journal	2004	Charles Brownstein, Greg Bennet, Tom Devlin, and Chris Pitzer	Steve Lieber	Jeff Smith, Drew Weing, Justin Hall, Winston Rowntree, Bruce Mutard, Diana Yee, Megan Kelso, Ron Regé Jr., R. Sikoryak, Jaime Hernandez, Gareth Hinds, Ben Towle, Matt Dembicki	186 pp.	Theme: War
SPX 2005	2005	Brian Ralph and Chris Pitzer	Brian Ralph	Rina Ayuyang, Marc Bell & Peter Thompson, Nick Bertozzi, Brendan Burford, Scott Campbell, Brian Chippendale, C. Cilla, Greg Cook, Jordan Crane, Jef Czekaj, Joe Derry, Max Estes, Martin Cendreda, Allison Cole and Eric Paul, Dave Lapp, Leif Goldberg, Sindre W. Goksoyr, Peter Hamlin, Jennifer Janviere, Damien Jay, Ben Jones, Bendik Kaltenborn & Kristoffer Kjolberg, Brian Maruca & Jim Rugg, Melody Nadia Shickley, Scott Morse, Vinh Ngo, Luke Ramsey, Jesse Reklaw, Federico Reggiani & Angel Mosquito, Matt Rota, Kevin Sherry, Kaz Strzepek, Sara Varon		

== See also ==
- Ignatz Awards
