= Gabagool! =

American comic book

Publication information
- Format: Comic book
- Publication date: 2002–2004
- No. of issues: 6
- Main character(s): Christopher Vigliotti, Ritch Sutton, Vinnie DelPino

Creative team
- Created by: Mike Dawson, Chris Radtke

Gabagool! is an American comic book that began in 2002. It was created by cartoonist Mike Dawson and humorist Chris Radtke, and concerns the various misadventures of a 30-something super-nerd, Christopher Vigliotti, and his friends Ritch Sutton and Vinnie DelPino. They live in the Bronx, New York, in an apartment owned by Christopher's cousin, Lenny Vigliotti.

== History ==
=== The early years ===
The comic started out in 2002 as a 24-page mini-comic debuting at the Small Press and Alternative Comics Expo in Columbus, OH, founded by Bob Corby and Dave Sim. Subsequent issues were produced at a rapid pace, and were generally timed to debut at all of the major North American comics festivals along the east coast. Issue #2 debuted at the very first MoCCA Arts Festival, sponsored by the Museum of Comic and Cartoon Art and Stella Artois. The double-sized "All Action Issue" #3 debuted at the annual Small Press Expo in Bethesda, MD, at a table shared with the creators of the now-defunct indy comic 23 skidoo.

=== The floppy years ===
In 2003–2004, Dawson and Radtke self-published issues 4-6 as traditional "floppy" comics printed at proper-comics-printer Quebecor graphics. Hubris prompted the boys to overprint issue 4, a mistake that they, their wives, and their storage spaces still regret today. With issues 5 and 6 a more manageable print run was decided upon, and sales were healthy. The floppies were picked up by the comics-distribution monopoly Diamond, as well as by other struggling competitors like Cold-Cut and Shenton 4 Sales.

=== The wilderness years ===
Following issue #6, the series went on an indefinite hiatus. Dawson moved onto a heart-felt graphic memoir about his relationship with legendary glam-rock Queen front-man Freddie Mercury (appropriately entitled Freddie & Me). Radtke has penned a number of different stories, including Everyday (which featured comic strip contributions from an impressive array of mini-comics superstars such as Bob Fingerman, Alex Robinson, Tony Consiglio, Cheese Hasselberger, and Scott Mills).

== The comic books ==
=== Gabagool! #1 – "Bounty Hunters" ===
It's the tail-end of the dot-com boom, and Christopher Vigliotti is sick of his boring desk job. When he gets home, he finds out that his good-for-nothing roommate Ritch has sold some of his CDs to pay the rent, including one by They Might Be Giants. It is unclear in the story if Chris was a fan of TMBG, but he's mad at Ritch anyway. Following an argument, Chris, Ritch, and their other roommate Vinnie, decide to become bounty hunters, like Boba Fett, or Robert De Niro in Midnight Run. Their first hunt is to find their friend Doreen's drunk dad, which they do. He was at a bar.

=== Gabagool! #2 – "The Meatery" ===
Christopher is sweet on Doreen and tries to impress her at the birthday dinner she invites him and his friends to at a fancy Manhattan Churrascaria. Chris decides the best way to impress the girl is to consume as many different types of meat as possible. The item of meat that he eats that is the funniest to say is "pork medallion". Meanwhile, Ritch and Vinnie realize that most of the other party guests are homosexual males, and we learn that both Ritch and Vinnie are homophobic. There is also an intellectually disabled little girl in the story, who gets upset at Chris when he talks about eating a rabbit.

=== Gabagool! #3 – "Rock Soldiers" ===
The bounty hunters are back with their second mission. This time they are hired by New York musician Jed Davis to retrieve a stolen electric guitar that once belonged to Ace Frehley. Christopher agrees to take on the assignment in exchange for a complete Alan Davis run of Excalibur comics. We also learn the origins of their silent friend, Aris... why is he so silent? Why does he just sit on the couch all day long and do nothing?

=== Gabagool! #1 – Special Edition ===
After completing "Rock Soldiers" Mike decided that rather than move on to something new, he'd spend a few months entirely re-drawing Gabagool! #1. Nothing was changed in terms of the main story, but the artwork was nicer throughout. A new three-page back-up story called "Christopher Vigliotti's Secret Santa" was included in this mini-comic. The new story took the place of the ads for urban culture websites, Hentai reviews, and amateur poetry, that had all been featured in the original Gabagool! #1.

=== Gabagool! #4 – "Christopher Vigliotti is Laid Off" (Hedonism Part 1) ===
The dot-com bubble has burst, and Christopher gets laid off. The good news is that he gets a fat severance. He and his room-mates decide that the best way to spend it would be on a vacation to the seedy Hedonism II resort in Jamaica. Before they leave, Chris undergoes a painful back waxing (a scene that appeared well before a similar, more famous situation in the movie The 40-Year-Old Virgin with Steve Carell closed the book on humorous back-waxing scenarios).

This issue includes the back-up story "Double Damage", which features a young Chris and Ritch with their childhood friends Jimmy Fan and Andrew Yee playing a racy game of Dungeons & Dragons.

=== Gabagool! #5 – "Hedo-Dogs (Hedonism Part 2) ===
Christopher, Ritch and Vinnie arrive in Jamaica and try their best to enjoy their holiday. Christopher is scared to buy marijuana at the airport, so he hides out in a Bob Marley gift shop while Ritch and Vinnie take care of business. They arrive at the resort, and witness a woman performing fellatio on a fat man while at dinner.

This issue includes the back-up story "The Mad Sh*tter", written by Dawson and Radtke, and guest-drawn by mini-comics superstar Tony Consiglio.

=== Gabagool! #6 – "Nudes and Prudes" (Hedonism Part 3 & The Finale) ===
The double-sized finale to the "Hedonism" story – 40 pages long with a wrap-around cover, including multiple repeat characters as a nod to previous issues, these characters can be seen on the back cover in the bushes and also appeared on the plane ride in issue #5. This could be indicating towards Chris' deteriorating mental health throughout the series. The boys meet a number of different guests at the resort, including a pack of middle-aged swingers. Ritch falls for a beautiful ice-skater, and Vinnie spends all of his time high as a kite on cocaine.

An excerpt from an online review: "It's not porn. Porn is intended to arouse. It's not erotic, either—erotic art succeeds in arousing. On the other hand, here's an erection, there's an erection ... here are a whole bunch of breasts ... here's a hideous hot tub orgy! If it's not porn and it's not erotic, what is this stuff?"

Included in this issue is a pin-up of the Gabagool! characters drawn by mini-comics superstar Alex Robinson, homaging the cover to Marvel Comics classic Avengers#4. Famously, Alex misspells the series title in the pin-up ("GABAGOL!").

== Apocrypha ==
Some Gabagool! stories have appeared in places besides the six issues of the original series.

=== "The Gabagool! Party Primer" ===
Mini-comic created as a free hand-out at the first official MoCCA Art Festival pre-convention party, hosted by Chris Radtke and the two guys he was currently living with.

=== "Dirty Banana" ===
From the 2003 Small Press Expo anthology, published by the Comic Book Legal Defense Fund.

=== "Thecret of the Thword" ===
Short story featuring the Lil' Gabagool! cast first seen in "Double Damage", was briefly serialized on the webcomics collective Act-i-vate. The story has not yet been publicly completed, and it is not known if the complete work will ever see the light of day.

== Inkswell ==
InkSwell, the fourth documentary from producer/director Jeff Cioletti focuses on the production of the final issue of Gabagool! Features extensive interviews with the creators, as well as appearances by Bob Burden (Flaming Carrot, Mystery Men), Evan Dorkin (Dork, Milk & Cheese), James Kochalka (Monkey vs. Robot), Crazeee Creators, Ben T. Steckler, and the real-life Cousin Lenny.

== Controversy ==
Chris Radtke has been criticized for his "Carny Barker" approach to selling Gabagool! comics at conventions. After a number of message board threads surfaced on The Comics Journal's website, tcj.com, criticizing Radtke and his sales techniques, he issued the following manifesto:

… I know my barking offends the delicate sensitivities of many a small press connoisseur, and for that, I deeply apologize for ruining your special day out. But in the end, I do it because I know Mike Dawson and I have a GREAT comic in Gabagool! and I want everybody on the planet to read it.

I am never mean, rude or belligerent...but I try to engage anybody who crosses my path. If you say "no," I don't chase after you. … saying "no" is "not that hard." Keep on trucking, little trucker. The time I waste on somebody who's not interested can be spent talking to somebody new. I'm there to sell my comics and myself and I do a kickass job of it. I've sold hundreds of books at SPX, MoCCA and SPACE; more often than not, I sell out. For a self-published humor book, that's fucking awesome. Find me anybody else who does that (or at least sells a hundred books) and I'll buy you and he/she a shot of the booze of my choosing.

For the handful of folks who get grumpy and ignore me and "will never ever buy a Gabagool! comic" it's really your loss. Sucks that you aren't reading my comic and that you are not buying my neighbor's books because of my loud mouth. You're being an ass for denying yourself some good shit and blaming me for it, but that's your call. You're at a comic book convention, not a crafts fair. But as I've done in the past, if you bitch about me on message boards, come up to me at a show, shake my hand and you can have the comics for free. You can think I'm a jerk and not want to give me money, but I want YOU to read Gabagool! regardless. You could use a good laugh.

— Chris Radtke, posted to The Comics Journal Message Board
