= International Comic Arts Forum =

Academic conference and international comics convention

- Status: Active
- Genre: Comics studies
- Frequency: (mostly) Annual
- Country: U.S.
- Inaugurated: 1995; 31 years ago at Georgetown University
- Founder: Tristan Fonlladosa; Guy Spielmann
- Most recent: April 20–23, 2023
- Filing status: Nonprofit
- People: José Alaniz, Frank Bramlett, Casey Brienza, Cecile Danehy, Charles Hatfield, Bill Kartalopoulos, Toph Marshall, Arturo Meijide Lapido, Jeff Miller, Mark Nevins, Elizabeth Nijdam, Osvaldo Oyola, Brittany Tullis, Qiana Whitted
- Website: www.internationalcomicartsforum.org

The International Comic Arts Forum (ICAF) is an academic conference and international comics convention. The mostly annual event has been described as one of the earliest academic initiatives in comics studies.

Presenters at ICAF over the years have included such notable academics as Donald Ault, Paul Gravett, Thierry Groensteen, M. Thomas Inge, Bill Kartalopoulos, Fedwa Malti-Douglas, and Douglas Wolk.

== Structure ==
ICAF has been described as "primarily a scholarly conference where papers on various aspects of comics around the world are presented." In addition to academics, practicing cartoonists are invited to present and discuss their work. Generally, the conference takes place on a Thursday through Saturday, with specialized academic presentations held on Thursdays and Fridays, with Saturdays featuring more festival-style programming aimed at a broader audience.

Since 2005, each ICAF has seen the presentation of the John A. Lent Award in Comics Studies to "...a current student who has authored, or is in the process of authoring, a substantial research-based writing project about comics."

== History ==
=== Origins: French embassy and Georgetown University ===
The International Comics and Animation Festival was founded in 1995 as a one-off event, conceived by Tristan Fonlladosa, a cultural attaché of the French Embassy, who proposed the idea to the Department of French at Georgetown University. Fonlladosa collaborated closely with Georgetown Professor Guy Spielmann, who played a pivotal role in organizing the conference by recruiting guests with academic backgrounds, thereby elevating the scholarly dimension of the event.

The second event in 1996 was another collaboration between Georgetown and the French embassy/Alliance Française. On a larger scale, this iteration of ICAF coincided with a traveling exhibition of European comics artists and the year's centennial celebration of American newspaper comic strips.

=== Affiliation with SPX ===
Fonlladosa left the U.S. after 1996, and Spielmann coordinated the 1997 show solo, while also organizing the creation of the ICAF Executive Committee to perpetuate the show.

From 1997 to 2000, as well as 2002 and 2004, ICAF was held in conjunction with the local area Small Press Expo (SPX). Typically, on Saturdays, ICAF programming centered on artist-centered activities, including discussions with and presentations by cartoonists from both Europe and America.

In 1998, the fourth iteration of the event, The Comics Journal devoted a section of an issue to coverage of the event.

From 1999 to 2002, the conference highlighted young alternative cartoonists, dubbed "New Voices."

Both ICAF and SPX were canceled in 2001 due to creators' travel difficulties related to the September 11, 2001 attacks.

=== Library of Congress and name change ===
From 2005 to 2007, ICAF was co-sponsored by the Library of Congress. The 2005 event — the tenth iteration — included a symposium tribute to Will Eisner, who had died earlier in the year.

During those years, an annual tradition included showcasing original cartoon artwork in the Library's Prints and Photographs Reading Room, with short-term exhibitions curated by Sara Duke and Martha Kennedy. Additionally, during this period, ICAF collaborated with George Washington University at their Gelman Library, organizing numerous artist presentations and a panel addressing the Jyllands-Posten Muhammad cartoons controversy.

In 2006 the event changed its name to the International Comic Arts Forum.

=== New locations ===
After 2007, ICAF began being held in various locations outside of the Washington, D.C. area. In 2008 and 2009, the conference was held at the School of the Art Institute of Chicago. There were no ICAF conferences held in 2010, 2012, 2015, 2018, or 2022.

In 2011, ICAF was held at the Center for Cartoon Studies in White River Junction, Vermont; and in 2013, it was held at the University of Oregon, with programming taking place at the university's Portland location.

In 2014, ICAF moved to Ohio State University's Billy Ireland Cartoon Library & Museum. The Comics Studies Society, the first U.S. association dedicated to supporting the study of graphic narrative and sequential art, was launched in 2014 at ICAF.

In 2016, ICAF was held at the University of South Carolina; in 2017 at the University of Washington, in Seattle; and in 2019 at St. Ambrose University, in Davenport, Iowa. Because of the COVID-19 pandemic, the 2020 ICAF conference was held online on various dates from October 22, 2020, to April 1, 2021. All programming was dedicated to the memory of former ICAF Ex-Com Chair Dr. Cécile Danehy.

In 2023, ICAF was held outside the U.S. for the first time, at the University of British Columbia, in Vancouver, Canada.

=== Event history ===
Dates	Primary Venue	Featured Guest(s)
1995	Georgetown University; Washington, D.C.	
Sept. 26-29, 1996	Georgetown University and Alliance Française; Washington, D.C.	Claire Bretécher (guest of honor), Pierre Christin
Sept. 18–20, 1997	Georgetown University and Small Press Expo (SPX); Washington, D.C. and Silver Spring, Maryland	Florence Cestac, Farid Boudjellal, Lucien Czuga and Roger Leiner, Gerrit de Jager, Michèle Laframboise, Patrick McDonnell, Tome, Jean-Marc Rochette, Karoline Schreiber, Frank Cho (special guest)
Sept. 24–25, 1998	SPX, Holiday Inn Select; Bethesda, Maryland	Slim, Strip Core (Igor Prassel & Jacob Klemencic), AMOK (Yvan Alagbé & Olivier Marboeuf), Dylan Horrocks, Will Eisner, Frank Miller, Actus Tragicus (Rutu Modan, Yirmi Pinkus, Mira Friedmann, Batia Kolton, & Itzik Rennert)
Sept. 16–18, 1999	SPX, Holiday Inn Select; Bethesda, Maryland	Jis & Trino, Jeff Smith, Charles Burns, Eddie Campbell, Ellen Forney, Jessica Abel, Brian Biggs, Jordan Crane, Jason Lutes, Matt Madden, Steven Weissman
Sept. 14–16, 2000	SPX, Holiday Inn Select; Bethesda, Maryland	Alice Chang, Christian Gasser, Anke Feuchtenberger, Martin tom Dieck, Philippe Dupuy & Charles Berberian, Bill Griffith, Kim Deitch, Will Eisner, Jeff Smith, Henriette Valium, Simon Bossé, Eric Braun, Renée French, Dean Haspiel, Jason Little, Brian Ralph, Craig Thompson
Sept. 5–7, 2002	SPX, Bethesda Holiday Inn; Bethesda, Maryland	Willem, Los Bros Hernandez, Sabine Witkowski, Art Spiegelman, David Lasky, Johana Rojola, Nick Bertozzi, Greg Cook, Kevin Huizenga, John Kerschbaum
Sept. 4–6, 2003	Georgetown University; Washington, D.C.	Francesca Ghermandi, Stefano Ricci, Lalo Alcaraz
Oct. 1–3, 2004	SPX, Holiday Inn Select; Bethesda, Maryland	John Benson, Steve Brodner, Tobias Schalken & Stefan Van Dinther, Lily Lau Lee Lee, Miguelanxo Prado, Paul Karasik, R. Sikoryak, Frank Cammuso, Keith Knight, Ted Rall, Mikhaela Blake Reid, Jen Sorensen
Oct. 13–15, 2005	Library of Congress; Washington, D.C.	Kevin Kallaugher, Ann Telnaes, Tom Toles, Jerry Robinson, Paul Grist, Benjamin Herzberg
Oct. 12–14, 2006	Library of Congress; Washington, D.C.	Jules Feiffer, Rupert Bazambanza & Ellen Yamshon, Phil Jimenez, Dennis O'Neil, Stuart Moore, Jamal Igle
Oct. 18–20, 2007	Library of Congress; Washington, D.C.	Ian Gordon, Lat, Kyle Baker
Oct. 9–10, 2008	School of the Art Institute of Chicago; Chicago, Illinois	Jorge Opazo Ellicker AKA Jorge Quien, Nicolas Mahler, Damian Duffy
Oct. 15–17, 2009	School of the Art Institute of Chicago; Chicago, Illinois	Guy Davis, Max, Pere Joan, John Miers, Sara Varon
Sept. 29–Oct. 2, 2011	Center for Cartoon Studies, Colodny Building; White River Junction, Vermont	Frémok, Pavel Kořínek & Tomáš Prokůpek, Robert Sikoryak, Stephen R. Bissette, Jason Lutes, James Sturm
May 23–25, 2013	University of Oregon, White Stag Building; Portland, Oregon	Gabriel Bá & Fábio Moon, Dmitry Yakovlev, Ville Hänninen & Tommi Musturi, Brian Michael Bendis, Kelly Sue DeConnick, Matt Fraction, Megan Kelso, Greg Rucka, T. Edward Bak
Nov. 13–15, 2014	Ohio State University, Billy Ireland Cartoon Library & Museum; Columbus, Ohio	John Lewis, Andrew Aydin, Nate Powell, Phoebe Gloeckner, Hanneriina Moisseinen, Jeff Smith, Justin Green, Carol Tyler, Dash Shaw, Tom Spurgeon
Apr. 14-16, 2016	University of South Carolina; Columbia, South Carolina	Cece Bell, Michael Chaney, Howard Cruse, Dominique Goblet, Sanford Green, Gary Jackson, Keith Knight
Nov. 2–4, 2017	University of Washington; Seattle, Washington	Jesús Cossio, Kelly Sue DeConnick, Ramzi Fawaz, Emil Ferris, Gary Groth, Moto Hagio, Nick Sousanis, Jim Woodring
April 4–6, 2019	St. Ambrose University; Davenport, Iowa	Marnie Galloway, Rob Guillory, Jaime Hernandez, Fernando "KOHELL" Iglesias, Alberto Ledesma, Ana Merino
October 22, 2020, to April 1, 2021 (various dates)	Held online	
April 20–22, 2023	University of British Columbia; Vancouver, British Columbia, Canada	Ebony Flowers, Priscilla Layne, Meghan Parker, Birgit Weyhe, Michael Nicoll Yahgulanaas

== See also ==
- Angoulême International Comics Festival
- Festival of Cartoon Art
