= Nickelodeon Magazine =

American children's magazine, 1990–2009

Nick Magazine

- The new Nick Magazine logo and the December 2009/January 2010 issue cover.
- Editor: R. L. Stine (1990); Laura Galen (1993–2007); Julie Winterbottom (2007–2009); Greg Herzog (2015–2016)
- Categories: Children, Entertainment
- Frequency: Monthly
- Circulation: Worldwide
- Publisher: Nickelodeon
- First issue: 1990 (Pizza Hut); 1993 (standalone); June 2015 (Papercutz)
- Final issue: 1990 (Pizza Hut); December 2009/January 2010 (standalone); 2016 (Papercutz)
- Company: Nickelodeon
- Country: United States
- Language: English
- Website: http://papercutz.com/nickmag

Nick Magazine was a defunct American children's magazine inspired by the children's television network Nickelodeon. Its first incarnation appeared in 1990 and was distributed at participating Pizza Hut restaurants; the version of the magazine only saw two issues. The magazine returned in Summer 1993 with all types of content, primarily humor and comics. Originally published on a quarterly basis, it switched to bi-monthly with the February/March 1994 issue. It then went to ten times per year starting in March 1995, with a bi-annual December/January and June/July issue until its end in 2009.

For most of its run, the magazine's editor-in-chief was Laura Galen. She wrote the goodbye message for the 159th and final issue in 2009.

On February 5, 2015, Papercutz announced that they worked a deal with Nickelodeon to create a new version of the magazine. The first issue was released in June 2015, and the final issue was released in 2016.

== Format ==
In spite of being related to the network it was named after, Nickelodeon Magazine covered many sorts of topics, not just what was on the network. The magazine contained informative non-fiction pieces, humor, interviews, comics, pranks and recipes (such as green slime cake). The magazine's mascot was Zelda Van Gutters, a Lakeland Terrier dog who appeared throughout the magazine with sarcastic asides on the articles. She was also the star of the magazine's semi-regular photo comic strip "Ruffing It".

Other contributors included Dan Abdo, John Accurso, Bill Alger, Graham Annable, Ian Baker, Tom Bunk, Martin Cendreda, Greg Cook, Dave Cooper, Jordan Crane, Mark Crilley, Scott Cunningham, Vincent Deporter, Stephen DeStefano, Evan Dorkin, Brent Engstrom, Feggo (Felipe Galindo), Gary Fields, Emily Flake, Ellen Forney, Francho (Arnoldo Franchioni), Dave Fremont, Tom Gauld, Justin Green, Tim Hamilton, Charise Maricle Harper, Paul Karasik, John Kerschbaum, Jacob Lambert, Roger Langridge, Chris Lanier, Robert Leighton, Alec Longstreth, Jason Lutes, Pat Moriarity, Dan Moynihan, Nate Neal, Mark Newgarden, Travis Nichols, Marc Tyler Nobleman, Roger Ochoa, Lark Pien, Johnny Ryan, P.Shaw!, Karen Sneider, Israel Sanchez, Jason Shiga, R. Sikoryak, Jen Sorensen, Art Spiegelman, Jay Stephens, Wayno, Todd Webb, Drew Weing, Steve Weissman, Kurt Wolfgang and Gahan Wilson.

In addition, Nick Magazine's comic books also featured comics from characters of the network's programming, which normally appeared just before a season premiere or special film event for the property on the actual series. Among the shows featured in the comic book were:

- Aaahh!!! Real Monsters
- The Adventures of Jimmy Neutron, Boy Genius
- The Angry Beavers
- As Told by Ginger
- Avatar: The Last Airbender
- CatDog
- Catscratch
- ChalkZone
- Danny Phantom
- El Tigre: The Adventures of Manny Rivera
- The Fairly OddParents
- Hey Arnold!
- Invader Zim
- KaBlam!
- Mr. Meaty
- My Life as a Teenage Robot
- Rocket Power
- Rugrats (and its spin-off All Grown Up!)
- SpongeBob SquarePants
- The Mighty B!
- The Ren & Stimpy Show
- The Wild Thornberrys
- The X's

== Nickelodeon Comics ==
Nickelodeon Comics, formally titled Nickelodeon Magazine Presents, was a series of one-shot special issues put out by Nickelodeon Magazine. Each issue tied in with comics. Nickelodeon Comics mainly contained comics, either newly made stories or two-page shorts reprinted from Nick Magazine, but also featured articles, puzzles, and poster inserts.

Other comics, appearing in both Nickelodeon Magazine's comics section and in the one-shot specials, included:

- Fiona of the Felines by Terry LaBan – A girl who is raised by cats. Her strips are occasionally accompanied by a similar strip titled Warren of the Worms.
- Grampa and Julie, Shark Hunters by Jef Czekaj – This strip's titular duo consists of a blonde-haired girl and her dimwitted grandfather started out searching for Stephen, the Largest Shark in the World. Their adventures from 1999 to 2003 have recently been reprinted in a graphic novel and a television pilot for an animated series was made by Klasky Csupo.
- Impy & Wormer by James Kochalka – These mini-strips (featured at the bottom of the comic pages, under the regular strips) starred a bug who does never speak proper English and constantly bothers a comparatively intellectual worm.
- Juanita and Clem by Craig Thompson — Whimsical tales of an adventurous young girl named Juanita and her less brave green friend named Clem.
- Karmopolis by Nick Bertozzi — An adventure strip in a world where everyone and everything is on wheels.
- Mervin the Magnificent by Richard Sala — A bumbling magician named Mervin solves crime with his rabbit sidekick.
- Patty-Cake by Scott Roberts – A bossy blonde-haired young lady with a flower in her hair.
- Sam Hill & Ray-9 by Mark Martin – A boy and his robot dog.
- Scene But Not Heard by Sam Henderson – The going-ons of a pink man and a bear, who compulsively pull pranks on each other. As the strip's name suggests, the comic is made entirely of pictures with no dialogue or sound effects. In the magazine's tenth anniversary issue, there was a "blooper strip" where the man and bear are talking. Also, there is an advertisement for a Scene But Not Heard musical in Grampa and Julie comic.
- Southern Fried Fugitives by Simon and Kim Deitch – The continuing adventures of a quartet of fried chicken pieces brought to life by a thunderstorm. This strip ended in December 1999.
- Teeny Weeny, the Tiniest Hot Dog in the World by Mark Martin (2005) – A miniature, but enthusiastic, hot dog.
- The Gag Station by various. One-panel gags, often featuring cartoonists such as Johnny Ryan, Mark Newgarden, Ellen Forney, Steve Weissman, Felipe Galindo, Ian Baker and Mark Martin.
- The Uncredibly Confabulated Tales of Lucinda Ziggles by Andy Ristaino — A young girl gets involved in fantastic adventures that no one ever believes.
- Twiggy Stumps: Outdoor Adventurist by Brian Ralph — A flaky outdoorsman and his wisecracking skunk-pal, Juniper.
- Underpants-On-His-Head Man by Michael Kupperman – Originally appeared as one of "the worst comic book superheroes ever". As his name suggests, he wears his underwear on his head. His archenemy is his coworker, Pants-On-His-Head Man.
- Yam by Corey Barba — A wordless comic starring a toddler with jet backpack, wearing a hoodie, in a whimsical world that features humanlike cats, pet TVs and other fantasy elements.
- Cupcake Of Time by Dave Cooper and Johnny Ryan - the comic features a Pig, a banana, a robot and toilet. That comic would later retooled into the groundbreaking animated series Pig Goat Banana Cricket, which aired in 2015.

== United Kingdom version ==
A British version of the magazine was published from 16 February 2011 as a collaboration between Nickelodeon and D. C. Thomson & Co. It seems to have been discontinued as of June 2012.

== Second era ==
Viacom ended operations of the magazine in June 2009 (though the last issue was published in December of that year) due to economic conditions and the continual move of the network's content to their website. The title continued to publish until the December/January 2010 issue, and the final issue featured an editorial from magazine SVP/Editorial Director Laura Galen thanking the magazine's readers. On February 5, 2015, Papercutz announced that they have worked a deal with Nickelodeon to revive the magazine. The new version was released in June 2015 and ended in 2016. The Nickelodeon series represented were:

- Breadwinners
- Sanjay and Craig
- Pig Goat Banana Cricket
- Harvey Beaks
- The Loud House
