= Box Office Poison =

Box Office Poison may refer to:

- Box Office Poison (series), a comic book series
- Box Office Poison (magazine article), a magazine article
