= Tricked (graphic novel) =

2005 graphic novel

Tricked is an American graphic novel written by Alex Robinson, published by Top Shelf Productions in 2005.

== Overview ==
Tricked was written over a period of four years, beginning after the publication of Robinson's last graphic novel, the award-winning Box Office Poison. It was nominated for several American Comics awards in 2006, winning two of them: the Harvey Award for Best Graphic Album of Original Work and the Ignatz Award for Outstanding Graphic Novel. Tricked has also been translated into German (Ausgetrickst), French (Dernier Rappels), Spanish (Estafados) and Polish (Wykiwani).

The story centers on the lives of six seemingly unconnected people over a period of a few weeks. As the story progresses, relationships and encounters between the characters form or are revealed, and they all find themselves in the same place at the story's climax.

== Characters ==
There are six lead characters who switch off short chapters; one will be the focus of the story for a few pages, then another, and after all six have been featured the cycle repeats. Ray Beam and Steve are the only characters who narrate their stories.

=== Lead characters ===
- Ray Beam, a rock star who has squandered four years since his last solo album. Before this, he was the lead singer of The Tricks, a pop band that released four hit albums and became one of the most famous bands in the world. As the story begins, he is dissolute, blowing money on call girls and drugs.
- Nick, a businessman who tells his wife that he's a fast-rising corporate executive, but he is actually a forgery artist at a sports memorabilia store called The Dug Out.
- Phoebe, a nervous high school student from New Mexico who arrives in the city looking for her father.
- Steve, a 37-year-old computer programmer whose marriage has ended, prompting him to stop taking his psychiatric medication. He is an obsessive fan of Ray Beam and the Tricks.
- Caprice, a waitress at the Little Piggy diner. By her own admission, she has terrible taste in men and has been drifting a bit aimlessly for five years. She is plus-size, and several of her ex-boyfriends have disparaged her weight. Caprice was a minor character in Box Office Poison.
- Lily, a pretty young temp at Ray Beam's promotional office Dwarf Star.

=== Supporting characters ===
- Marty Gayce, Ray Beam's manager. He's unusually honest and avuncular, nice to anyone who's helpful to Ray, and at the same time very protectful of his client.
- Boris, the manager of The Dug Out. An extremely unscrupulous and surly businessman of Eastern European origins.
- Richard Krinker, the co-owner and co-manager of The Little Piggy diner. He is Phoebe's father; she has not seen him since he left her and her mother when Phoebe was a young child.
- Frank, Richard's partner, and the co-owner/manager of the diner.
- Ivy, Lily's protective sister.
- Boyd, a cute and adoring man Caprice meets while waiting in line for the restroom during a bad double date.

== Story ==
Rock star Ray Beam is mulling over the decline of his career; he is still making money from residuals, but he is unable to write new music. Ray is shaken up when Lily, a temp at his promotional office, asks for his autograph - the machine that automatically signs autographs is not working, so she asks Ray to do the job himself. Ray invites Lily into his limousine, where he attempts to seduce her. She rebuffs him; to his shock, Ray realizes that Lily is not one of his fans. This intrigues him, and he offers Lily a job as his "personal assistant."

At the same time, a teenage girl named Phoebe is taking a bus to the city from New Mexico. Her eventual destination is The Little Piggy Diner, owned by Richard Krinker, whom she believes is her father. The diner has become a popular tourist attraction, but it has a relatively small staff. Caprice, a waitress at the restaurant, has never been in a healthy romantic relationship until she meets Boyd, a bartender. She starts dating Boyd around the same time Phoebe reconnects with Richard. Phoebe is integrated into the diner's life, taking a job as a waitress and hanging out with Richard and his significant other, Frank. Caprice takes Phoebe to a sports memorabilia store called The Dug Out to buy a gift for Boyd.

Nick, the clerk at the Dug Out, has told his wife, Linn, that he has a successful corporate job; in actuality, he is a signature forger who has been stealing from the business. He immediately develops a crush on Caprice after selling her a baseball with a fake signature; feeling guilty, he gives her a full refund and a baseball card with a genuine signature, on the condition she will go on a date with him. She accepts because she is feeling dissatisfied in her relationship with Boyd. Nick and Caprice begin dating, unbeknownst to Boyd or Linn.

While all of this is happening, a computer engineer named Steve has stopped taking his medication, which slowly causes him to go down a psychotic spiral. He feels bitter about his life, especially his love life, and he grows more and more obsessed with his favorite singer, Ray Beam. He receives a signed photo from Ray's office: the photo that Lily asked Ray to sign himself. Since the signature looks different than the signatures on the other Ray Beam photos in Steve's collection, and since Ray drew devil horns and a beard on the photo, Steve obsesses over it. A voice in his head convinces Steve that the real Ray Beam has been replaced by an evil imposter. Steve loses his job, gets a gun from his grandmother's house, and plots to assassinate the "phony" Ray.

Ray had hoped Lily would become his muse, and lucky for him, she does. Newly inspired, he takes her to a recording studio in the Caribbean, then to a series of exotic locations, and asks her to marry him. She says yes. While on their honeymoon in Las Vegas, Lily walks into a room of call girls that have been hired by Marybeth, Ray's former personal assistant (who had been doing the real work while Ray fell in love with Lily). She flees, but Ray and his manager, Marty, convince her to come to a reconciliation dinner at a place of her choosing. She chooses the Little Piggy Diner.

Caprice gets tired of Nick's rudeness and deception and realizes that she loves Boyd. Phoebe thanks Richard for letting her stay, but says she wants to return to her mother in New Mexico. After Ray and Lily sit down for dinner, Nick arrives, bruised and bloody - he has killed the manager of the Dug Out in a brawl over the stolen money. Nick does not inform Caprice of the murder, but he hurriedly asks her to go on a road trip with him. While she tries to get him to leave, Steve sneaks in through the open door. He attempts to shoot Ray, but Nick dives in the way, takes the bullet, and dies.

Some time later, Steve is in prison and back on medication, telling his story to a sleazy journalist; he describes Nick's murder as an out-of-body experience. Phoebe is in college and working at the diner, where she serves two surprise guests: Caprice and Boyd, still happily together. Ray and Lily are settling some accounts in their mansion. Lily reads Ray a thank-you letter from Nick's family, for the "generous gift" he provided after Nick died saving Ray's life. Lily reads the sales figures for Ray's comeback album, which are disappointing. Ray shrugs it off, and excitedly tells Lily about the new song he's working on. She expresses interest in hearing it, and they kiss.
