= Chris Staros =

American editor (born 1962)

- Areas: Editor, Publisher

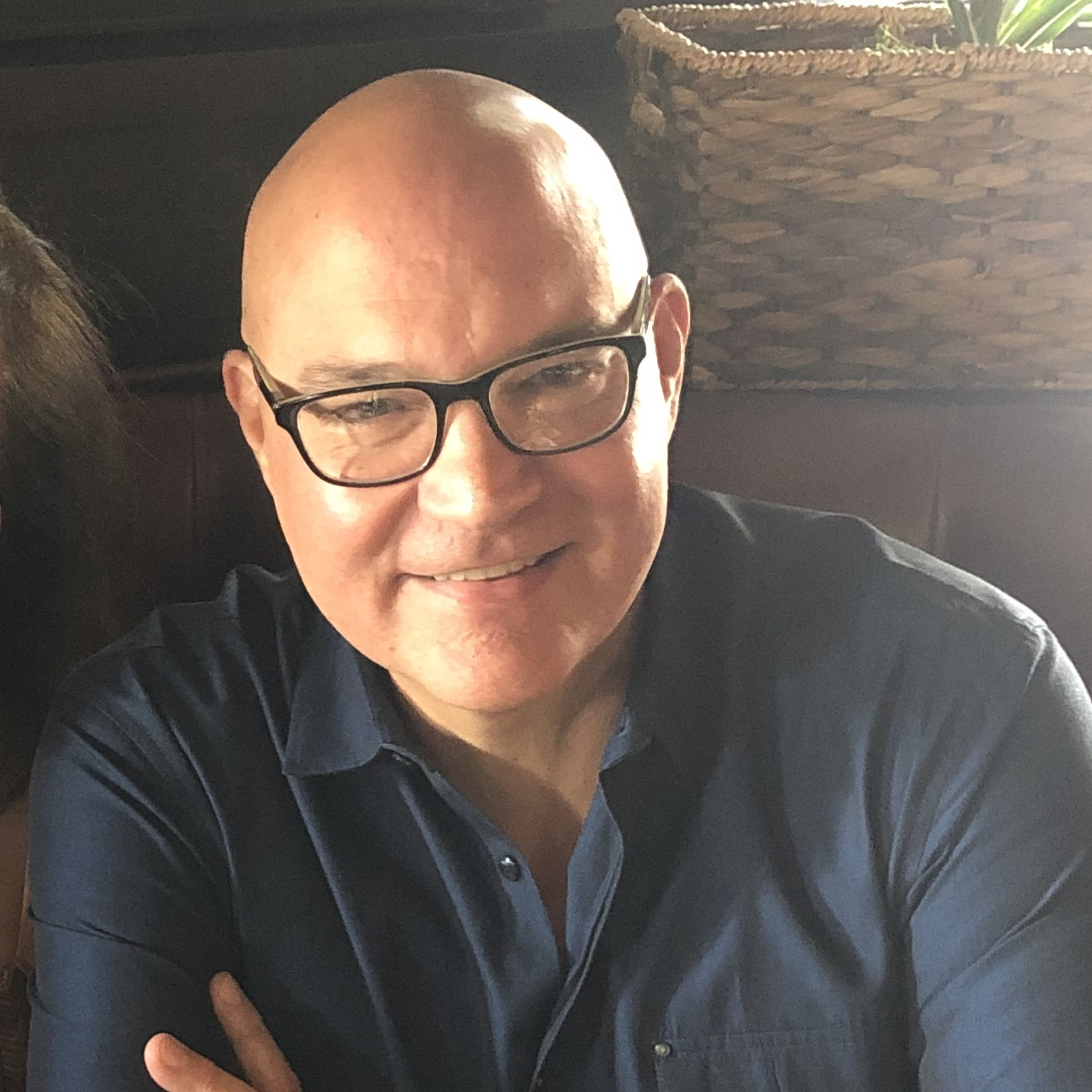
Chris Staros in 2019

Chris Staros (born 1962) is the Editor-in-Chief of the graphic novel publishing company Top Shelf Productions, and also does comics mentoring for aspiring comics professionals at his website. He is also the author of Yearbook Stories, 1976–1978, published by Top Shelf.

== Early life ==
Staros never read comics as a child, thinking that books with pictures were for children. Later, he learned guitar and spent years playing in rock bands. As an adult, Staros spent a decade in the high-tech software industry. One day in 1990, Staros stepped inside a Marietta, Georgia, comic book store. Uninterested in superhero comics, Staros was directed to Alan Moore and David Lloyd's V for Vendetta. That chance encounter led to Staros making comics his career.

== Career ==
Staros spent the next four years studying all forms of comics, from the Smithsonian Collection of Newspaper Comics to contemporary alternative titles. He officially entered the comics field in 1994 with The Staros Report, an annual fanzine dedicated to promoting "the most intelligent and innovative" graphic novels in the business. In addition to ranked reviews, each issue of The Staros Report featured interviews, comics, bibliographies, character guides, letters, and more. He published four editions of The Staros Report, during which time he also became the American art and distribution agent for cartoonists Eddie Campbell and Gary Spencer Millidge.

At the 1997 Small Press Expo, Staros joined forces with Brett Warnock as publisher of Top Shelf Productions. Staros and Warnock have aimed to give their imprint a style "that is quite hip, but also quite endearing", and Staros regularly signs correspondence with the tagline "Your friend thru comics." Staros & Warnock envisioned Top Shelf — together with Fantagraphics Books, Drawn & Quarterly and the now defunct Highwater Books — as an attempt to "change the public perception and face of comics altogether".

In 2000 Staros delivered the keynote speech at the Ignatz Awards, arguing that the industry must focus more on content, and that more works of the merit of Moore and Campbell's From Hell and Chris Ware's Jimmy Corrigan would help the public re-evaluate their perceptions of the medium.

Yearbook Stories: 1976-1978 (published in 2007) features two autobiographical tales from Staros's formative years: "The Willful Death of a Stereotype," illustrated by Bo Hampton, and "The Worst Gig I Ever Had," illustrated by Rich Tommaso. "The Willful Death of a Stereotype" originally appeared in the 2001 Small Press Expo Anthology and was nominated for the 2002 Eisner Award for Best Short Story. "The Worst Gig I Ever Had" (which originally appeared in the 1999 Small Press Expo Anthology) tells the story of Staros's very first hard rock band, and one of its more memorable gigs.

Chris Staros is the Editor-in-Chief of Top Shelf Productions, one of the leading independent publishers of literary graphic novels. In the recent past, he was also an adjunct professor at the Savannah College of Art and Design (SCAD) teaching Sequential Art classes to the next generation of industry professionals (2012-2017). Since the release of his first fanzine, The Staros Report, in 1994, and co-founding Top Shelf Productions in 1997, Chris has published over 400 graphic novels that have helped the medium of comics thrive as a well-rounded and literary art form. Most notably, the March trilogy by John Lewis, Andrew Aydin, and Nate Powell; They Called Us Enemy by George Takei, Justin Eisinger, Steven Scott, and Harmony Becker; From Hell by Alan Moore & Eddie Campbell; Lost Girls by Alan Moore & Melinda Gebbie; The League of Extraordinary Gentlemen by Alan Moore & Kevin O'Neill; Blankets by Craig Thompson; Essex County and The Underwater Welder by Jeff Lemire; Super Spy by Matt Kindt; Surfside Girls by Kim Dwinell; Monster on the Hill by Rob Harrell; Red Panda & Moon Bear by Jarod Roselló; Clumsy and Unlikely by Jeffrey Brown; Cosmoknights by Hannah Templer; and God is Disappointed in You by Mark Russell and Shannon Wheeler—all of which have garnered accolades from the likes of CNN, NPR, Time, USA Today, Entertainment Weekly, Publishers Weekly, and the New York Times (with two having been made into major motion pictures). To date, he has 28 years of comics publishing experience, with 5 million indie graphic novels sold.

== Personal life ==
Chris Staros lives in Charleston, South Carolina.
