= Storyboard jam =

A "storyboard jam" is when artists pass along a single storyboard template around a group. Each artist sequentially adds a panel to progress the sequence. In the animation industry, these jams—or "storyboard parties"—often feature creators letting off steam by drawing humorous, obscene and inappropriate spoofs of famous characters.

The most infamous example of a "storyboard jam" was the Rugrats animatic titled "Incredible" created by Steve Ressel back in 1998 during his experience at Klasky Csupo, with its surviving page showing Tommy Pickles giving Angelica Pickles a cup of juice spiked with Drano and dog food before an out-of-character, abusive Stu Pickles barges in, abusing everyone and snatching the cup from Tommy to drink out of before sexually remarking Angelica as "daddy's little girl". The storyboard was passed along to other artists who contribute 3-4 frames before being confiscated when given to the production crew of The Wild Thornberrys due to its sexual incest imagery.

Other examples include Spongebob Squarepants with Behind Closed Doors, Dragon Tales, The Iron Giant, My Little Pony: Friendship is Magic and Hi Hi Puffy AmiYumi. However, most other "storyboard jams" made were never surfaced online, either being leaked on the internet, mentioned by production staff members, or destroyed for good.

== See also ==
- Behind Closed Doors (book)
- Parody
- Rule 34
