= Mike Dawson (cartoonist) =

British-American cartoonist (born 1975)

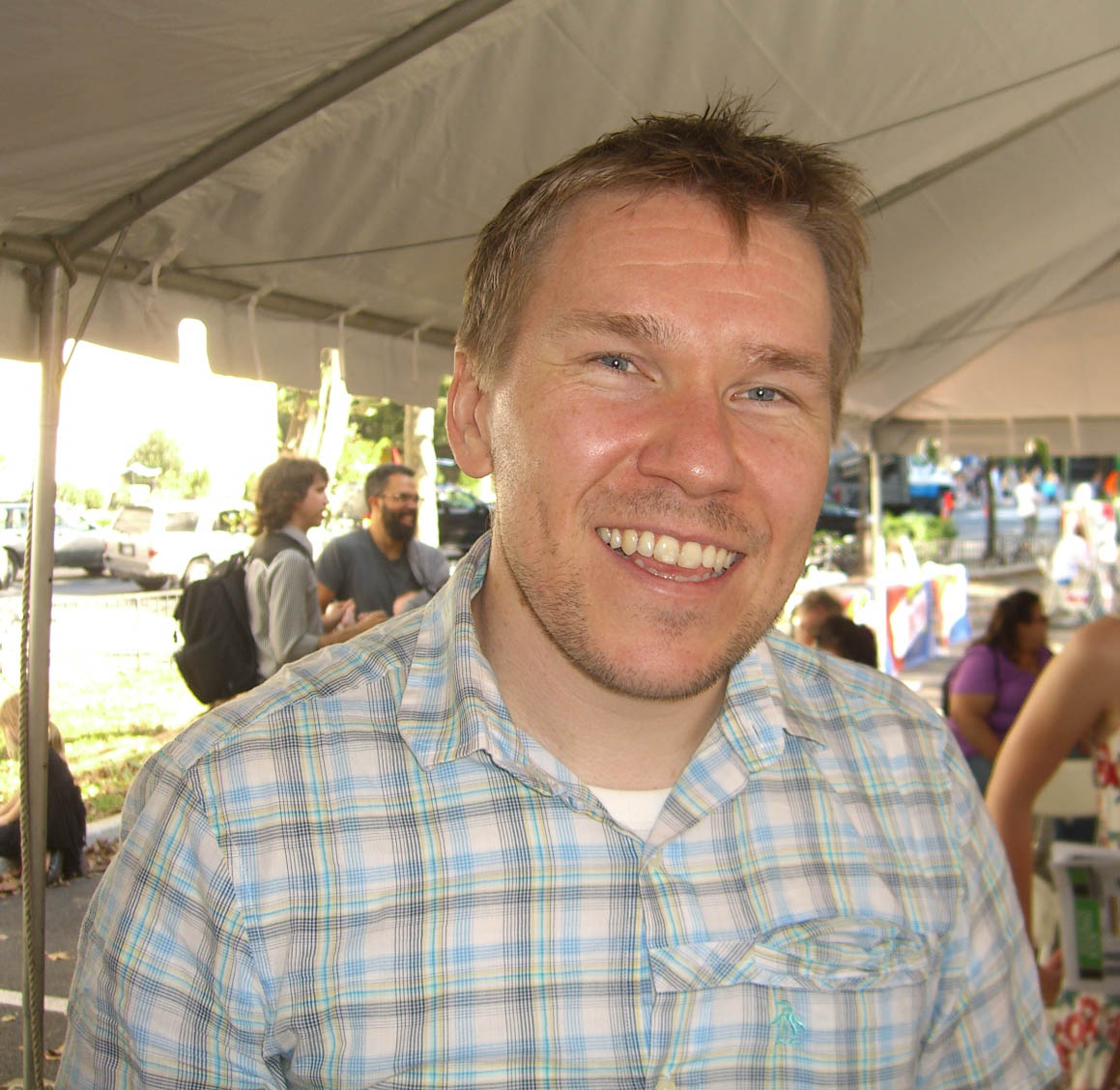
- Dawson at the 2009 Brooklyn Book Festival.
- Born: 1975 (age 50–51) Scotland
- Areas: Artist, Writer
- Notable works: Freddie & Me; Ace-Face; Gabagool!

Mike Dawson (born 1975) is a British-American cartoonist, known for his work on books such as Freddie & Me, Ace-Face, Gabagool! and The Fifth Quarter series for middle-grade readers.

== Early life ==
Dawson was born in Scotland, but his family moved to Leighton Buzzard, England when he was still an infant. They emigrated to the United States in 1986, where his family settled in Red Bank, New Jersey. He studied painting at the Mason Gross School of the Arts at Rutgers University.

== Career ==
Between 1995 and 1998, Dawson wrote and drew a daily comic strip for his college newspaper The Daily Targum. He worked with multiple collaborators, and the strip went through a number of incarnations: Dave & Pissa, Dave & Co, and Dave’s Family.

From 2002–2004, he self-published the humor series Gabagool!, with co-writer Chris Radtke.

His first graphic novel, Freddie & Me: A Coming-of-Age (Bohemian) Rhapsody, was published in 2008. In it, Dawson presents a memoir of his younger days as an obsessive fan of the rock group Queen and of the band's flamboyant, charismatic, and vocally gifted lead singer, Freddie Mercury. Dawson explores how the music of Queen corresponds to significant events and meaningful time periods in his life, particularly in his youth.

A collection of short stories entitled Ace-Face: The Mod With the Metal Arms was published in 2009 by AdHouse Books.

Dawson's webcomic Troop 142 received the Ignatz Award for Outstanding Online Comic in 2010. Troop 142 was published as a graphic novel in 2011 by Secret Acres.

Dawson is the co-host of The Ink Panthers Show!, a weekly podcast with cartoonist Alex Robinson. Guests have included Tony Consiglio, Vanessa Davis, Julia Wertz, Dylan Horrocks, Sarah Glidden, and Matt Fraction.

Dawson was also the host of a second podcast, TCJ Talkies, which appeared on The Comics Journal website biweekly. Guests included Craig Thompson, Jessica Abel, Tim Kreider, Howard Cruse, and Renee French.

== Bibliography ==
=== Graphic novels ===
- The Hidden Dominion of Geordie James (2026) Union Square Kids
- The Fifth Quarter: Hard Court (2022) First Second Books
- The Fifth Quarter (2021) First Second Books
- Rules for Dating My Daughter (2016) Uncivilized Books
- Troop 142 (2011) Secret Acres
- Ace Face: The Mod with the Metal Arms (2009) AdHouse Books
- Freddie & Me: A Coming of Age (Bohemian) Rhapsody (2008) Bloomsbury USA

=== Anthologies ===
- New Jersey Fan Club: Artists & Writers Celebrate the Garden State (2022) Rutgers University Press
- The ACT-I-VATE Primer (2010) IDW
- Awesome 2: Awesomer (2009) Top Shelf Productions
- PopGun #3 (2009) Image Comics
- House of Twelve #4 (2007) House of Twelve
- Superior Showcase #1 (2006), with Dean Trippe, Nick Bertozzi, & Hope Larson. AdHouse Books
- True Porn Vol. 2 (2005) Alternative Comics
- You Ain’t No Dancer (2005) New Reliable Press
- Project: Superior (2005) AdHouse Books
- SPX Anthology (2003) Published by the Comic Book Legal Defense Fund

== Awards ==
- Eisner Award Nomination for Best Short Story, "Life During Interesting Times" (2019)
- Eisner Award Nomination for Best Webcomic, "Dispatch From a Sanctuary City" (2018)
- Ignatz Award Nomination for Outstanding Graphic Novel (2012)
- Ignatz Award Winner for Outstanding Online Comic (2010)
- Ignatz Award Nomination for Outstanding Artist, Outstanding Series, Outstanding Minicomic (2010)
- Day Prize Nomination for "Guitar Solo" mini-comic (2006)
- Ignatz Award Nomination for Promising New Talent (2002)
