= The Cute Manifesto =

2005 book by James Kochalka

- The cover of James Kochalka's The Cute Manifesto.
- Author: James Kochalka
- Language: English
- Subject: Comics
- Publisher: Alternative Comics
- Publication date: 2005
- Publication place: United States
- Pages: 168
- Preceded by: American Elf
- Followed by: American Elf vol. 2

The Cute Manifesto is a book by James Kochalka released by Alternative Comics in 2005, containing many of his comics-format essays on the scope and impact of the comics medium, and his views on the importance of cuteness. Much of the material in The Cute Manifesto was collected from Kochalk's own minicomics and other out-of-print comics titles.

The premise of many pieces in the book is that simplicity is desirable in comics and that "craft is the enemy" (which is the title of one of the pieces in the book.) (Beginning in 1996–1997, Kochalka had spirited public debates in print and online with other cartoonists who disagreed with his position.) Kochalka's publisher coyly frames the book as Kochalka's "answer to Dianetics, calling it "a powerful mixture of philosophy and comics that can literally change your life forever. . . . Kochalka tackles all of the big issues… comics and art, birth and death, technology and joy, and everything in between."

The back cover of the book features short quotes from the artists Constantin Brâncuși, Pablo Picasso, James Ensor, Elaine de Kooning, and Odilon Redon on the importance of making art.

== Contents ==
1. “Craft is the Enemy” (text, no pictures)
2. "Craft is Not a Friend" (text, no pictures)
3. "Sunburn" — originally published in 2000
4. "Reinventing Everything" part 1 — originally published in minicomics form
5. "Reinventing Everything" part 2 — originally published in minicomics form
6. "The Cute Manifesto"
7. "The Horrible Truth about Comics" — originally published in 2001
8. "Spelunking for Slippery Cave Fish"
