= Sam Henderson =

American cartoonist (born 1969)

- Born: October 18, 1969 (age 57) Woodstock, New York
- Notable works: Magic Whistle; Behind Closed Doors

Sam Henderson (born October 18, 1969) is an American cartoonist, writer, and expert on American comedy history. He is best known for his ongoing comic book series Magic Whistle. He was a contributor to the animated television series SpongeBob SquarePants and Camp Lazlo. Henderson has contributed work to Duplex Planet Illustrated, Zero Zero, 9-11: Artists Respond, Volume One, Mega-Pyton, Maakies, Nib-Lit, Legal Action Comics, and the animated shorts compilation God Hates Cartoons. He has also been a past participant in Robert Sikoryak's Carousel multimedia slideshow series.

== Biography ==
Henderson was born in Woodstock, New York. He attended Boiceville, New York's Onteora High School, graduating in 1987, and the School of Visual Arts in New York City, where he graduated in 1991.

Henderson has been self-publishing xeroxed minicomics since 1980. In the mid-to-late 1980s he drew and published a comic called Captain Spaz with his friend Bobby Weiss. The series ended in 1988 as he was busy in college. In college, he drew a series of minicomics featuring a character known as Monroe Simmons. In 1993 he began self-publishing his best-known title, The Magic Whistle, now published by Alternative Comics. Also in 1993 he began the wordless comic strip Scene but Not Heard, starring a pink man and a red bear, in Nickelodeon Magazine. It was the magazine's longest-running comic strip. A collection was released in 2013.

In its review of Magic Whistle: Bigger, Larger and Bigger! the San Antonio Express-News wrote that Henderson's "crude, blobby little scratchings are some of the funniest junk being turned out." Henderson was nominated for the Harvey Award's Special Award for Humor every year from 1999 to 2004. Henderson also served on the Ignatz Award jury in 2001.

Henderson also worked on the third season of SpongeBob SquarePants as a writer and storyboard director. He teamed up with Jay Lender on all episodes except "The Camping Episode," on which Lender and Dan Povenmire served as storyboard directors. In 2003, Henderson's writing and storyboard directing work on SpongeBob SquarePants earned him a nomination for Best Animated Program (for programming less than one hour) in the 55th Emmy Awards. Henderson also compiled Behind Closed Doors.

In 2005, Henderson worked as writer and storyboard director of "Parents Day," a season-two episode of Camp Lazlo.

Henderson currently lives in his hometown of Woodstock, New York.

== Awards ==
- 1997 (nomination) Ignatz Award for Outstanding Minicomic for Magic Whistle #9
- 1999 (nomination) Harvey Award Special Award for Humor
- 2000 (nomination) Harvey Award Special Award for Humor
- 2001:
  - Firecracker Alternative Book Award for Poetry for Little Book of Ass (with writer Shappy)
  - (nomination) Harvey Award Special Award for Humor
  - (nomination) Ignatz Award for Outstanding Series for Magic Whistle (Note: 2001 Ignatz Awards canceled due to September 11 attacks.)
- 2002:
  - (nomination) Harvey Award Special Award for Humor
  - (nomination) Ignatz Award for Outstanding Series for Magic Whistle
- 2003:
  - (nomination) Primetime Emmy Award for Outstanding Animated Program for SpongeBob SquarePants
  - (nomination) Harvey Award Special Award for Humor
- 2004 (nomination) Harvey Award Special Award for Humor

== Bibliography ==
- Magic Whistle minicomic (self-published, 10 issues, 1993–1997)
- Oh That Monroe: The Complete Adventures of Monroe Simmons (Wow Cool, 1995) — some material previously appeared in Kar-Tunz, Hyena, Cruel and Unusual Punishment, and Destroy All Comics, as well as several self-published works from 1989 to 1993
- The Magic Whistle (Alternative Comics, 15 issues, 1998–2016)
  - Magic Whistle: Bigger, Larger, and Bigger! (Magic Whistle #9) (Alternative Comics, 2004) ISBN 978-1-891867-68-2
- Behind Closed Doors: Horrible, Filthy, Vile, Disgusting, Inappropriate, Off-Model Drawings by the Crew of a Popular Cartoon Show (early 2000s)
- Humor Can Be Funny (Alternative Comics, 2005) ISBN 978-1891867415
- (illustrator) Well Defined: Vocabulary in Rhyme, by Michael Salinger (Boyd's Mills Press, 2009)
- Scene But Not Heard (Alternative Comics, 2013) ISBN 978-1934460924
- Magic Whistle 3.0 (Alternative Comics, 3 issues, 2015–2016)
