= Behind Closed Doors (book) =

Unreleased pornographic SpongeBob SquarePants book

- Editor: Sam Henderson
- Author: Various
- Original title: Behind Closed Doors: Horrible, Filthy, Vile, Disgusting, Inappropriate, Off-Model Drawings by the Crew of a Popular Cartoon Show
- Illustrator: Sam Henderson, Jay Lender, Kent Osborne, (Note: Credited as "Tek Bonerson".) other unidentified illustrators
- Language: English
- Subject: SpongeBob SquarePants
- Genre: Pornography
- Publication date: July 18, 2023 (leak of excerpt)
- Publication place: United States
- Media type: Art book
- Never officially published, not intended for public distribution

Behind Closed Doors: Horrible, Filthy, Vile, Disgusting, Inappropriate, Off-Model Drawings by the Crew of a Popular Cartoon Show is an unreleased book of pornographic drawings of SpongeBob SquarePants characters created by storyboard artists for Nickelodeon in the early 2000s. First publicly mentioned by SpongeBob storyboarder Kent Osborne in a 2012 Hogan's Alley interview, excerpts from Behind Closed Doors were leaked online in July 2023 after an anonymous former Nickelodeon employee contacted YouTuber LSuperSonicQ with information about and a limited selection of drawings from the book. Critical analysis of Behind Closed Doors mostly focused on the graphic crudeness of the illustrations, and spawned discussions about the purpose of such material (as well of "storyboard jams" in general) when done by artists of family shows.

== History ==
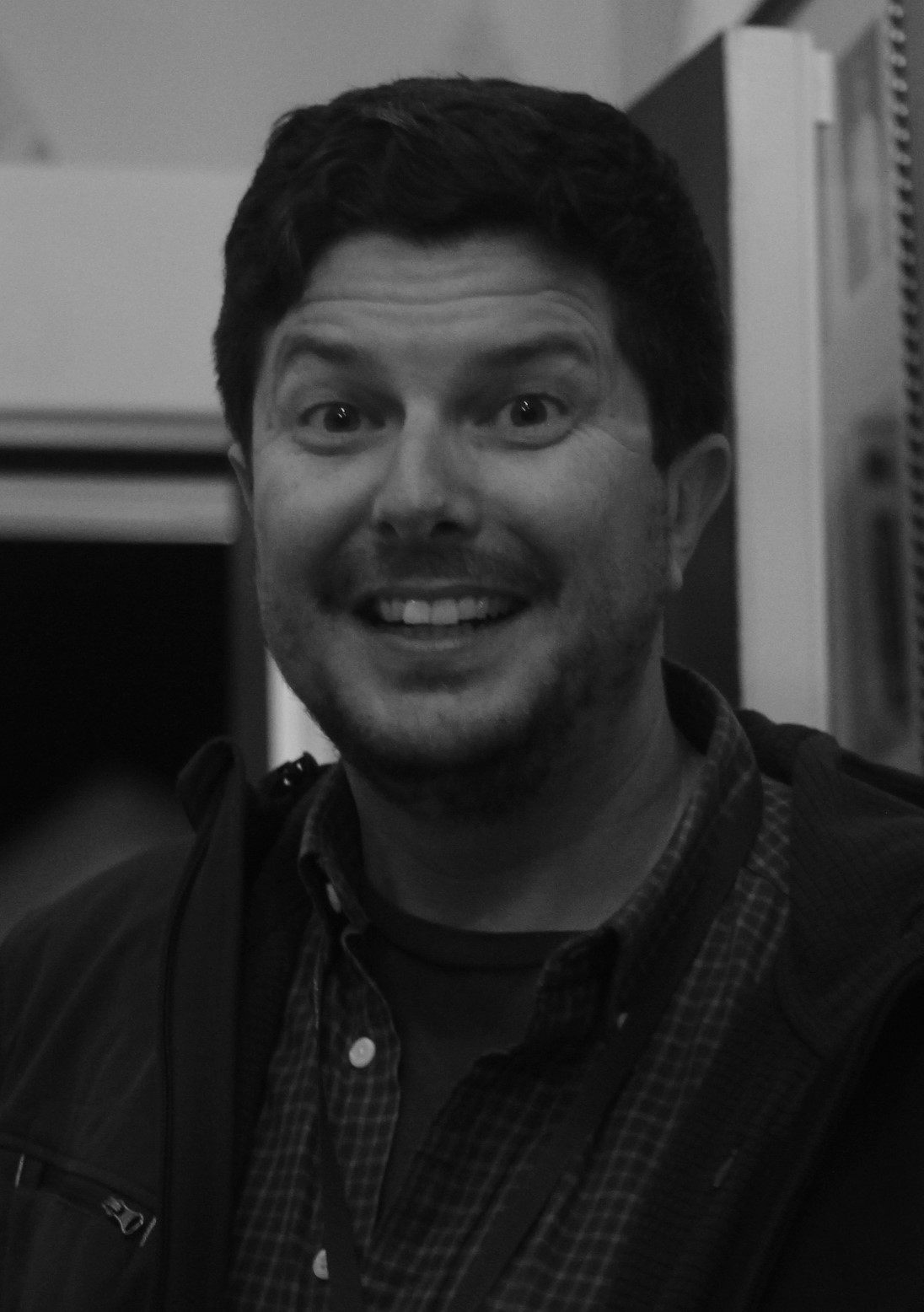
Kent Osborne contributed to Behind Closed Doors in the early 2000s.

SpongeBob SquarePants is a popular animated television show that premiered on Nickelodeon in 1999. In the early 2000s, storyboard artists for the show, such as Sam Henderson and Kent Osborne, would create crude illustrations of SpongeBob characters on Post-it Notes to relieve anger and amuse their coworkers. In 2012, Osborne made the first public mention of Behind Closed Doors in an explanation to Hogan's Alley:

"At the end of the season, all the storyboard artists would do these hilarious, crude drawings of SpongeBob on Post-It notes just to make everyone else laugh. And these drawings would go on the back of the door, because if the door was open no one would see them. Sam Henderson took all of these Post-Its and made them into a book and gave a copy to everybody. The name of the book was Behind Closed Doors. He didn't want to put everyone's names in case it fell into the wrong hands, so he made anagrams of everyone's name and put them on the back of the book. They were hilarious. The anagram for me was Tek Bonerson. To this day, when I see Tom Kenny, he lights up and says, "Tek!"

== Contents ==
Behind Closed Doors contains hundreds of pornographic drawings of SpongeBob characters. The illustrations are crudely drawn and contain scenarios such as SpongeBob masturbating, Mr. Krabs defecating into a toilet, and Squidward Tentacles "reimagined as a sentient penis with tentacles".

== Discovery ==
In the years since Osborne revealed the book's existence in 2012, Behind Closed Doors took on a "legendary" status in the SpongeBob community due to the elusiveness and mysteriousness of the project. In July 2023, an anonymous ex-employee of Nickelodeon contacted YouTuber LSuperSonicQ, known for creating videos about lost media, with information about Behind Closed Doors. The ex-employee explained to LSuperSonicQ that his copy of the book "was one of the originals rather than being a 3rd, 4th, 5th, printing", and was "held together in a nondescript spiral notebook". The ex-employee provided LSuperSonicQ with the book's front cover and six images depicting SpongeBob characters in sexual scenarios. The ex-employee also asserted that Behind Closed Doors contains "1940s war imagery that uses company logos" and drawings of SpongeBob characters being physically harmed. LSuperSonicQ used the information and images the ex-employee provided him with to create "The Darkest SpongeBob Lost Media, Found", a video which discusses the images and their historical background.

== Reception ==
Upon being leaked in July 2023, the drawings in Behind Closed Doors spawned a debate about the purpose of its contents. Writing for Kotaku, Isaiah Colbert characterized the drawings as "unhinged" and said Nickelodeon storyboard artists should never make pornographic illustrations again. Screen Rant's Hannah Gearan, Giant Freakin Robot's Chris Snellgrove, Hocmarketing's Van Toan, and Softonic's Randy Meeks argued that Behind Closed Doors could be "childhood-ruining", echoing Colbert's reporting that SpongeBob SquarePants fans experienced "an influx of distress" when the book was revealed.

LSuperSonicQ also expressed a critical view of Behind Closed Doors in "The Darkest SpongeBob Lost Media, Found". He argued that the book was possibly malicious in nature and concluded, "The takeaway from Behind Closed Doors is not the fact that it simply exists for shock value, but the fact that it exists as a remnant of a studio that has been plagued with controversy, even in the best of content that has been produced for us." Meeks shared LSuperSonicQ's opinion and asserted that there were "obvious ethical issues" with the book's contents.

== See also ==
- Rule 34
- Tijuana bible
