= The Clouds Above =

2005 graphic novel

- Cover art for the 2005 hardcover edition.
- Date: September 2005
- Main characters: Simon; Jack
- Publisher: Fantagraphics

Creative team
- Creators: Jordan Crane
- ISBN: 978-1-560-97909-8

The Clouds Above is a graphic novel by Jordan Crane, recounting the adventures of a boy named Simon and a cat named Jack. The pair skip school one day to avoid a nasty teacher and wander onto the roof. The staircase that they discover leads them above the clouds. They meet friendly pink clouds, dangerous storm clouds, and a flock of yellow birds. Their adventure is fast-paced, suitable for readers of many ages.

The Clouds Above appeared originally as a weekly webcomic, under the name "Cloud Country." This series was a precursor to the final book, with some pages omitted and others rendered as only black-and-white drawings. Crane used the name "Jane d'Rancor" on these early strips. The series ran from April 2003 to January 2004. The eventual hardcover edition of the completed work was released in September 2005 by Fantagraphics comics.

The Clouds Above was received positively by reviewers. One wrote in the New Yorker, "Crane’s drawings are clean, yet full of nuance; his writing is playful and sharp. The artistry is in the detail." Another wrote in Publishers Weekly that "the book is a joy to look at - Crane's loose, gliding lines burst with character, and his compositional gifts make every panel worth contemplating on its own."
