= Star Wars Minute =

Daily podcast

Presentation
- Genre: Comedy, film
- Created by: Peter "Pete the Retailer" Bonavita and Alex Robinson
- Language: English
- Updates: DailyOngoing

Publication
- Original release: June 3, 2013

Related
- Website: http://www.starwarsminute.com/

Star Wars Minute is a daily podcast that analyzes, scrutinizes and celebrates the Star Wars movies in sequential order, with each episode covering a single minute of the movies in the franchise. The podcast is hosted and created by Peter "Pete the Retailer" Bonavita and Alex Robinson, and features a rotating cast of guest commentators. So far, the series has covered the original trilogy, the prequel trilogy, The Force Awakens and The Last Jedi from the sequel trilogy, Rogue One: a Star Wars Story, and Solo: A Star Wars Story. The podcast is viewed as a trendsetter for "movies by minutes" podcasts and Vulture has called it the "Ur-text" for podcasts that examine films minute-by-minute.

== History ==
The first episode, analyzing the first minute of Star Wars: A New Hope, aired on June 3, 2013. The series was inspired by another podcast, Mission Log, which analyzes the Star Trek series episode by episode. The podcast began to grow a cult following, and by the time Robinson and Bonavita began recording Return of the Jedi, the podcast had merchandise and its own Patreon page. Bonavita stated in 2017 that the podcast's new and old episodes combine for over 100,000 listens a week.

== Seasons ==
=== Season 1: The Motion Picture ===
The show's first season covered Star Wars: Episode IV – A New Hope, and spanned 122 episodes. This season's episodes tended to be shorter, with the first episode clocking in at just 11 minutes. Notable guests from this season that would go on to become series regulars include Tony Consiglio and Chris Radtke among others.

=== Season 2: The Empire Strikes Back ===
Before wrapping season 1, Bonavita and Robinson announced that they would be returning for The Empire Strikes Back minute. Minute 1 aired on January 13, 2014, just two months after season 1 wrapped. The duo hosted a live podcast on June 15, 2014 (Father's Day) covering minutes 111 and 112, in which Darth Vader informs Luke that he is his father.

=== Season 3: Return of the Jedi ===
Bonavita and Robinson began analyzing Return of the Jedi on January 5, 2015. For minutes 79 and 80 (in which Luke and Leia discuss their parentage with each other), the duo hosted another live show at Star Wars Celebration in Anaheim with guest Matt Gourley. Notable first-time guests for this season include Paul Rust.

=== Season 4: The Phantom Menace ===
Bonavita and Robinson began analyzing The Phantom Menace (which they refer to as "The Naboo Movie" as part of a superstition they have) on November 23, 2015. Notable guests this season include Mark Hamill's son, Nathan.

=== Season 5: Attack of the Clones ===
Bonavita and Robinson began analyzing Attack of the Clones on November 14, 2016. For minutes 101 through 105, the duo recorded a live podcast on a cruise ship as part of the Fan2Sea Cruise.

=== Season 6: Revenge of the Sith ===
Bonavita and Robinson began analyzing Revenge of the Sith on November 13, 2017. Bonavita had only seen the movie once in the theaters, allowing for a unique perspective on the film. Throughout the season, the duo would often reference The Force Awakens and other Disney-Era Star Wars movies, implying that they would continue making Star Wars Minute past the Lucas era of movies.

=== Season 7: The Force Awakens ===
Bonavita and Robinson began analyzing The Force Awakens on November 12, 2018. This season marked the first in which the trilogy of the film they were analyzing was not yet complete, as Star Wars: The Rise of Skywalker would not be realized for another year. This allowed for more plot-related speculation amongst the hosts and guests.

=== Season 8: Rogue One ===
Season 8 began on November 18, 2019, and analyzes Rogue One.

=== Season 9: The Last Jedi ===
Bonavita and Robinson began analyzing The Last Jedi on February 1, 2021.

=== Season 10: Solo ===
Season 10 began on February 21, 2022, and analyzes Solo.

=== Season 11: The Rise of Skywalker ===
Bonavita and Robinson began analyzing The Rise of Skywalker on April 17, 2023.

== The Mandalorian ==
On November 13, 2019, Bonavita and Robinson launched The Mindalorian, a spinoff podcast analyzing the Disney+ series The Mandalorian. This podcast has its own separate feed apart from Star Wars Minute, and analyzes the show episode by episode rather than minute by minute.

== Reception ==
Star Wars Minute has been called "the seed of a rapidly expanding podcast genre" by the pop-culture website The Ringer due to its minute-by-minute format, which has now bled into hundreds of other podcasts analyzing films such as Back to the Future, The Big Lebowski, Goodfellas, and the superhero franchises of Marvel and DC.

In 2017, the podcast made Thrillist's list of "8 'Star Wars' Podcasts You Need to Listen To," stating that "the show will give you a brand-new appreciation of the sequels, and help you look a little closer and the minutia of cinema in general." PCMag also named it one of their "Best Podcasts for 2019".
