= James Kochalka =

American cartoonist (born 1967)

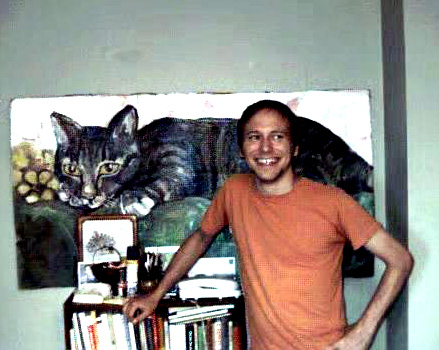
- James Kochalka at home in August 2000 in Burlington, Vermont
- Born: May 26, 1967 (age 59) Springfield, Vermont, U.S.
- Area: Cartoonist
- Notable works: American Elf; Sketchbook Diaries; SuperFuckers
- Awards: Ignatz Award (x4); Harvey Award (2006); Vermont Cartoonist Laureate (2011–2013)
- Spouse: Amy
- Children: 2

James Kochalka (born May 26, 1967) is an American comic book artist, writer, animator, and rock musician. His comics are noted for their blending of the real and the surreal. Largely autobiographical, Kochalka's cartoon expression of the world around him includes such real-life characters as his wife, children, cat, friends and colleagues, but always filtered through his own observations and flights of whimsy. In March 2011 he was declared the cartoonist laureate of Vermont, serving a term of three years.

== Early life and early career ==
Kochalka was born and grew up in Springfield, Vermont. He attended the Maryland Institute College of Art and has an MFA in painting.

His first published comics work was around 1994. He has cited cartoonist Daniel Clowes as being a key inspiration in leading him "towards a whole world of comics that [he] never knew existed." Kochalka strongly believes that simplicity is desirable in comics and says that "craft is the enemy", and has had public debates in print and online with other cartoonists who disagree with his position. Kochalka's "Craft Is the Enemy" essays were collected in the 2005 book The Cute Manifesto.

== Career ==
Kochalka spent six years working in a Chinese restaurant in Winooski, Vermont, before leaving to devote his full energy to cartooning and music. His song "Hockey Monkey", recorded with the band The Zambonis, was the theme song for the Fox series The Loop.

=== Comics and graphic novels ===
Comic book writer/artist Frank Miller told SuicideGirls that he is a "big fan of James Kochalka," predicting Kochalka is "going to become more important and it's going to be fun watching that happen. He reminds me of me when I was six years old and I came into my mother's kitchen with a bunch of sheets of typing paper folded over and stapled in the middle that were covered with drawings and I said 'Mom this is what I'm going to do for the rest of my life.' I've learned a lot from people like Kochalka because they do stuff that shouldn't work but does."

Kochalka is prolific in his comics work. He told an interviewer in 2002 that he had created 2,000 pages of comics by the time he completed high school. His work is characterized by a simple drawing style, bright colors, and frequent appearances by cats, robots, elves, and monkeys.

Among his most widely disseminated works is a four-page story, "Hulk vs. the Rain", that originally appeared in black-and-white in an unauthorized alternative comic called Coober Skeber. The story was later redrawn in color by Kochalka for inclusion in Marvel's Incredible Hulk 2001 Annual. The first issue of his comic SuperF*ckers sold approximately 2,500 copies through Diamond Distributing. In 2002, Kochalka said that all 5,000 copies of the first printing of the Monkey vs. Robot graphic novel had sold out. There has since been a second printing, and in an interview in August 2006 Kochalka said that over 10,000 copies of Monkey vs. Robot have been sold to date.

Kochalka created the comic Impy and Wormer, which appeared in Nickelodeon Magazine.

In July 2012 Kochalka won the Eisner Award for his book Dragon Puncher 2: Dragon Puncher Island.

Kochalka's two primary publishers are Top Shelf Productions and Alternative Comics. He has also published numerous short stories in comics anthologies, self-published his own mini-comics, and published graphic novels through other publishers such as Black Eye, Slave Labor Graphics and Highwater Books. He also makes the SpongeFunnies in the SpongeBob Comics series of comics.

==== American Elf ====
For more than 14 years, from October 26, 1998 to December 31, 2012, Kochalka produced a daily diary comic strip. These strips have been published by Top Shelf Productions, first as The Sketchbook Diaries and then in collected form as American Elf. Kochalka told The Onion that he wrote the first diary entry while traveling by plane to San Diego Comic-Con. Kochalka's friend and fellow cartoonist Brian Ralph was working on his comics on the flight, and Kochalka was inspired to begin cartooning on the plane as well. Kochalka created diary strips during the week of the convention, and committed to doing a diary strip every day. The strip finally ended on December 31, 2012, with one final epilogue-style strip titled "Am I Alive?" published on March 23, 2013. Additionally, Kochalka published a tribute entry to his cat, Spandy, after her death in February 2014.

The book American Elf is a collection of Kochalka's daily diary strips, released in a large edition by Top Shelf Productions in Summer 2004, compiling five years of the daily diary strips and other supplemental material. A second volume was released in early 2007, collecting years six and seven of the daily strips in full color. A third volume followed in November 2008, collecting the years 2006 and 2007 in color.

Beginning in December 2007, Kochalka made all of his daily diary strip archives free for all readers; previously the archives had only been accessible to paying subscribers, with only the newest strip available for free. Under the relaunched "American Elf Supersite," all the archived strips dating back to 2002 were free for all readers, while paying subscribers receive access to other comics and MP3s. Kochalka reported on his blog that the site had received around 200,000 hits as a result of the change. Subsequently he opened the archives all the way back to the strip's beginning in 1998. As of 2017, those archives are no longer available, as the bulk of Kochalka's sketchbook diaries are sold in digital editions by Kochalka's publisher Top Shelf Productions.

Not long after the laureate appointment was announced, he caught flak on a Seven Days staffer’s blog for a questionable cartoon depicting a friend’s ex-girlfriend, which he’d published exclusively online. Kochalka quickly removed the cartoon and apologized.

==== SuperFuckers ====
SuperFuckers (censored as "SuperF*ckers", "SuperF***ers", or "Super'F'-ers") is an adult-rated comic book series published by Top Shelf Productions between 2005 and 2007. The series revolves around a collection of crude and rude superheroes who never actually do any superhero work. Frederator Studios approached Kochalka with the possibility of producing an animated cartoon based on the comics. After pitching the show around to various cable television networks, Frederator produced the series for distribution on its YouTube funded partner channel Cartoon Hangover. The series premiered on November 30, 2012. The first season consists of twelve five-minute episodes and follows closely to the comics. The series features David Faustino in the lead role of Jack Krak, as well as Maria Bamford, Jaleel White, Veronica Belmont, Phil Morris, and Jeff B. Davis. The series was directed by Fran Krause, written by Kochalka, and features the music of Anthony Davis and Dustin Pilkington of Best Fwends.

==== Glorkian Warrior ====
Glorkian Warrior is a series of books oriented at a younger audience. created by Kochalka and published by FirstSecond. The first (of three) is called Glorkian Warrior Delivers a Pizza. The second graphic novel, Glorkian Warrior Eats Adventure Pie was released in March 2015 and the third book The Glorkian Warrior and the Mustache of Destiny came out a year later.

The character was created by Kochalka and along with Pixeljam was made into a video game called Glorkian Warrior: The Trials of Glork.

=== Video games ===
Pixeljam Games released Glorkian Warrior: Trials of Glork for iOS in March 2014, and subsequently for Android, PC, and Mac. Kochalka and Pixeljam funded the project with a Kickstarter beginning in 2010.

=== Teaching ===
Kochalka was an instructor at the Center for Cartoon Studies, a cartooning school in White River Junction, Vermont that was founded by cartoonist James Sturm. Kochalka is part of the Little Idiot Collective, a group of artists assembled by the musician Moby.

=== Music ===
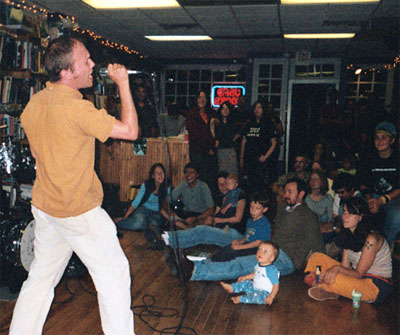
James Kochalka performs in August 2004 at the Crow Bookshop in Burlington, Vermont.

Kochalka's band, James Kochalka Superstar, has released nine albums.

Spread Your Evil Wings and Fly was completed some time before its release in the fall of 2005; an online petition was launched to convince Kochalka's record label Rykodisc to release the CD. Over 500 people signed the petition demanding the album's release. It was followed by "Digital Elf" in 2009, "Good Morning, Glorkian Warrior" in 2015, "How To Tie A Tie On The Internet" in 2018, and "Eggs" in 2019. Additionally, two of Kochalka's other recordings have been released since, "Monkey Vs. Robot" and "Why Is The Sky Blue". Both hold copyrights from 1997 and 2005, respectively, and are listed on Spotify with those release dates.

Virtually all of Kochalka's CDs come packaged with his cartoons in the accompanying pamphlets, in some cases using the pamphlet as a full-length mini-comic.

Kochalka's best-known musical works are probably the songs "Pizza Rocket" and "Hockey Monkey", the music videos for which were shown on Nickelodeon's animation showcase series KaBlam!.

Rolling Stone named "Britney's Silver Can" one of "The 100 Best Songs of 2006".

The song "Hockey Monkey", which James co-authored with The Zambonis, was used as theme song of the Fox comedy, The Loop.

Kochalka was also in the band Jazzin' Hell, and contributed vocals as the character Frank Poole in the rock opera CD, ODYSSEY!

Moby sang back-up vocals on a seven-inch single from Kochalka's former band Jazzin' Hell, an outtake of which resurfaced on Kochalka's album Don't Trust Whitey.

== Personal life ==
Kochalka lives in Burlington, Vermont with his wife Amy and their two sons, Eli and Oliver.

== Awards ==
Kochalka's comics have earned him four Ignatz Awards (Outstanding Minicomic 1997, Outstanding Series 2002, Outstanding Online Comic 2003 and 2004), a Harvey Award (Best Online Comic 2006), and multiple nominations for the Eisner Award.

In 1999, Kochalka was nominated for the Harvey Award for Best New Talent. His Peanutbutter and Jeremy's Best Book Ever (Alternative Comics, 2003) was nominated for a 2004 Eisner Award for Best Title for a Younger Audience.

== Bibliography ==
- American Elf (limited edition hardcover; published by Top Shelf) (May 2004)
- American Elf (softcover; published by Top Shelf) (2004)
- American Elf Vol. 2 (softcover; published by Top Shelf) (Mar. 2007)
- Atlas 1 (backup story; published by Drawn and Quarterly)
- Bizarro Comics (wrote Hawkman story illustrated by Dylan Horrocks; DC Comics)
- Bogus Dead (zombie anthology with two-page story by Jason Cooley and James Kochalka)
- Conversation #1 (with Craig Thompson; published by Top Shelf) (May 2004)
- Conversation #2 (with Jeffrey Brown; published by Top Shelf) (Aug., 2005)
- Cute Manifesto, The (Aug. 2005; published by Alternative Comics)
- Dragon Puncher (2010; Top Shelf)
- Dragon Puncher Island (2011; Top Shelf)
- Deadbear, Circus Detective (self-published hardcover)
- Fancy Froglin's Sexy Forest (2003; published by Alternative Comics)
- Fantastic Butterflies (2002; published by Alternative Comics and Highwater Books)
- Fungus (2011; Retrofit Comics)
- Fungus: The Unbearable Rot of Being (2014; Retrofit Comics / Big Planet Comics)
- The Glorkian Warrior Delivers a Pizza (2014; First Second)
- The Glorkian Warrior Eats Adventure Pie (2015; First Second)
- The Glorkian Warrior and the Mustache of Destiny (2016; First Second)
- Horrible Truth About Comics, The (2001; published by Alternative Comics)
- James Kochalka Superstar #1–11 (Self-published mini-comics)
- Johnny Boo: The Best Little Ghost in the Whole World (Vol. 1) (Top Shelf)
- Johnny Boo: Twinkle Power (Vol. 2) (2008; Top Shelf)
- Johnny Boo and the Happy Apples (Vol. 3) (2009; Top Shelf)
- Johnny Boo and the Mean Little Boy (Vol. 4) (2010; Top Shelf)
- Johnny Boo Does Something! (Vol. 5) (2013; Top Shelf)
- Johnny Boo Zooms to the Moon! (Vol. 6) (2014; Top Shelf)
- Johnny Boo Meets Dragon Puncher (2015; Top Shelf)
- Johnny Boo Goes Like This (Vol. 7) (2016; Top Shelf)
- Johnny Boo and the Ice Cream Computer (Vol. 8) (2018; Top Shelf)
- Johnny Boo Is King! (Vol. 9) (2018; Top Shelf)
- Johnny Boo and the Midnight Monsters (Vol. 10) (2019 (upcoming); Top Shelf)
- Kissers (1999; published by Highwater Books)
- Little Mister Man #1–3 (Slave Labor Graphics)
- Magic Boy and Girlfriend (1998; published by Top Shelf)
- Magic Boy and the Robot Elf (2003; published by Top Shelf)
- Mechaboys (2018; published by Top Shelf)
- Mermaid (1998; published by Alternative Comics)
- Monica's Story (1999; published by Alternative Comics)
- Monkey vs. Robot (Vol. 1) (First Edition) (2000; published by Top Shelf; 2nd edition, in smaller size published in 2005 by Top Shelf)
- Monkey vs. Robot (Vol. 2): Crystal of Power (2003; published by Top Shelf)
- Noisy Outlaws, Unfriendly Blobs, and Some Other Things (anthology featuring 12-page Kochalka story; 2005; published by McSweeney's)
- Paradise Sucks (Black Eye Books)
- Peanutbutter & Jeremy #1–4 (2000–2003; published by Alternative Comics)
- Peanutbutter & Jeremy's Best Book Ever (Dec. 2003; published by Alternative Comics)
- Perfect Planet and Other Stories, The (1999; published by Top Shelf)
- Pinky & Stinky (2002; published by Top Shelf)
- Quit Your Job (1998; published by Alternative Comics)
- Reinventing Everything #1 (self-published mini-comic)
- Reinventing Everything #2 (self-published mini-comic)
- Sketchbook Diaries (Vol. 1) (2003; published by Top Shelf)
- Sketchbook Diaries (Vol. 2) (2003; published by Top Shelf)
- Sketchbook Diaries (Vol. 3) (2003; published by Top Shelf)
- Sketchbook Diaries (Vol. 4) (Dec. 2003; published by Top Shelf)
- Squirrelly Gray (Aug. 2007; published by Random House)
- Sunburn (2000; published by Alternative Comics)
- Sunturd (2003) (mini-comic written by Jason Cooley, same art as Sunburn)
- SuperFuckers #1 (Mar. 2005; published by Top Shelf)
- SuperFuckers #2 (Aug. 2005; published by Top Shelf)
- SuperFuckers #3 (2006; published by Top Shelf)
- SuperFuckers #4 (2007; published by Top Shelf)
- Tiny Bubbles (1998; published by Highwater Books)
- Top Shelf #1 (anthology title with Kochalka contribution; published by Top Shelf)
- Top Shelf #5 (anthology title with Kochalka contribution; published by Top Shelf)
- Top Shelf #6 (anthology title with Kochalka contribution; published by Top Shelf)
- Top Shelf Asks the Big Questions (anthology title with Kochalka contribution; published by Top Shelf)
- Triple Dare #1–2 (1998–2000; Published by Alternative Comics)

== Discography ==
Albums

- 1995: The True Story of James Kochalka Superstar (CD, Dot Dot Dash, DOT 7)
- 1996: 4-Track Egomaniac (cassette, self-release)
- 1997: Monkey vs. Robot (CD & comic book, Tarquin Records, TQ-018)
- 1998: Punk Ass Bitch [with Jason Cooley] (cassette, self-release)
- 1999: Kissers (bonus CD with graphic novel, Highwater Books)
- 1999: Carrot Boy the Beautiful (CD, Sudden Shame, SS024)
- 1999: Mermaid [with R Stevie Moore] (cassette, self-release)
- 2001: Don't Trust Whitey (CD, Tarquin Records, TQ-025)
- 2002: Hot Chocolate Superstar (download-only, Dangerfive Records)
- 2002: Danger Force Five Singles Club [with Colin Clary] (download-only, Dangerfive Records)
- 2004: Punky Brewskies [as Punky Brewskies, with Jason X-12] (cassette, Icebox Records IB3-001)
- 2006: Spread Your Evil Wings & Fly (CD, Rykodisc, RCD-10840)
- 2009: Digital Elf (CD, Top Shelf)
- 2012: Beautiful Man (download-only, self-release)
- 2018: How to Tie a Tie on the Internet (Internet release, Kochalka Quality)
- 2019: Eggs (internet release, Kochalka Quality)

EPs

- 1992: Egg Hunt [with Jazzin' Hell] (7″, Thicker Records, TQ-003)
- 1996: Bad Astronaut (7″, Mustard Records, MUST001)
- 2012: I Am the Beast (download-only, self-release)

Singles

- 1994: "Superstar Rastafari" b/w "2000" [The Pants] (7″, Split Records, SPL-004)

Compilations and Best-Of

- 1995: Hot Dog Hot Rod Rider from Good Citizen Vol. 1 The Soundtrack to the Zine (CD, Good Citizen)
- 1996: Ballbuster (Headlock cover) from "Burlington Does Burlington, Vol 1 & 2" (CD, Good Citizen)
- 1997: President Kochalka from "Pop Pie" (Big Heavy World)
- 2003: Even the Clouds Get High from Rykodisc The Anthology (CD, Rykodisc)
- 2005: Our Most Beloved (CD, Rykodisc RCD 10678) (a best-of compilation packaged with a five-video DVD)
- 2006: Why Is the Sky Blue? (download-only, Rykodisc/WEA) (a best-of compilation)
- 2010: Digital Elf/Kissers (LP re-release, Señor Hernandez Records)
