= Steve Weissman =

American sportscaster

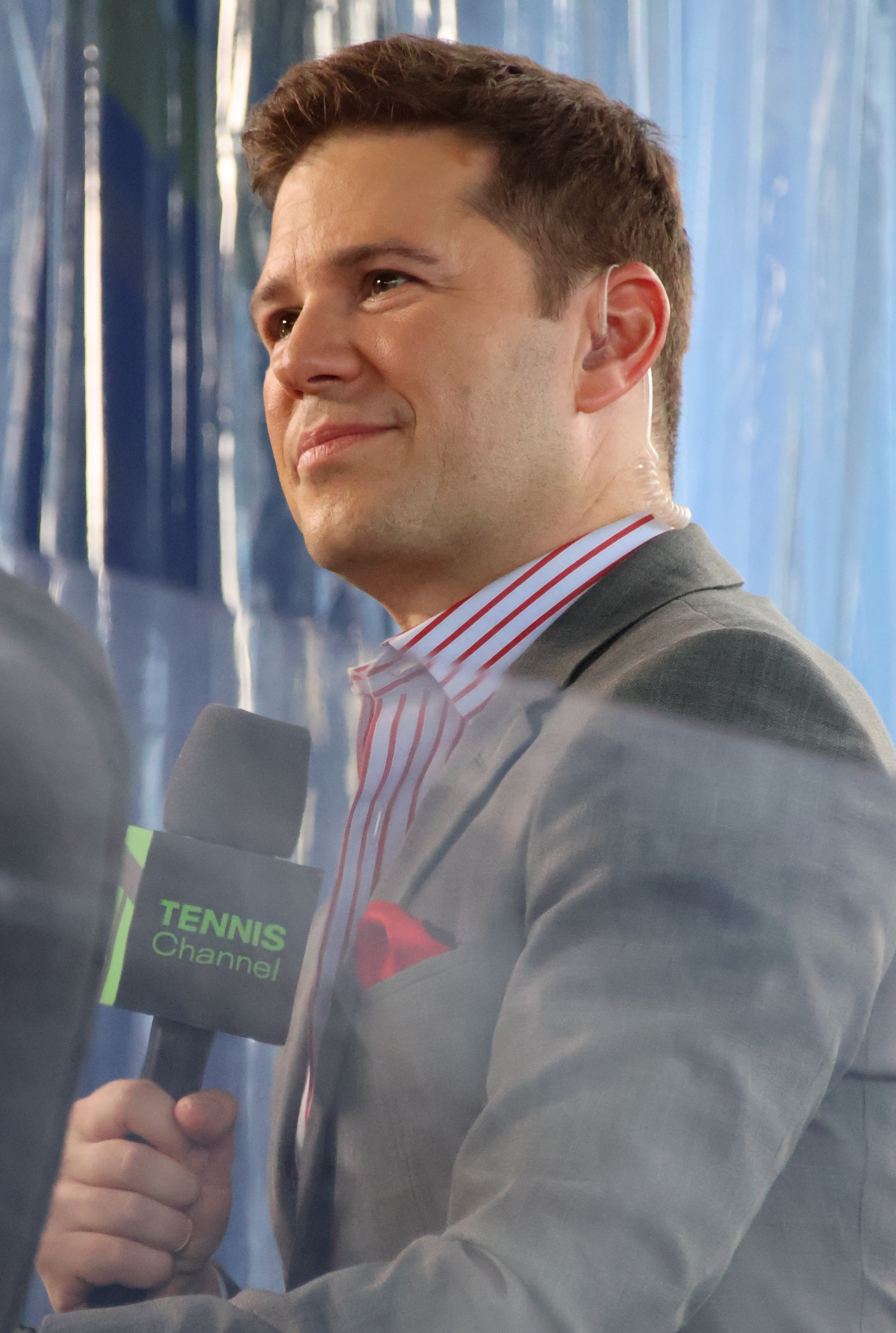
- Weissman in 2026
- Born: Steve Weissman
- Education: Northwestern University (BSJ); Medill School of Journalism
- Occupation: Sportscaster

Steve Weissman is an American sportscaster who works for Tennis Channel. He previously worked for ESPN and before that at Comcast Sportsnet (CSN) in California, where he served as the network's lead anchor. Before CSN, he worked at WNEM in Saginaw, Michigan, winning multiple Michigan Association of Broadcasters Awards.

Weissman also served as the sports anchor/reporter at WMTV in Madison, Wisconsin, and began his career as a sports anchor/reporter at WBKB in Alpena, Michigan. He hosted SportsCenter and other shows at ESPN from 2010 to 2015. He later joined NFL Network and Tennis Channel.

== Personal ==
Weissman is a D.C. native, a graduate of Springbrook High School in Silver Spring, Maryland, and the Medill School of Journalism at Northwestern University in Evanston, Illinois where he was a member of the Sigma Chi fraternity.
