= Greg Cook (cartoonist) =

American cartoonist

Greg Cook is an underground cartoonist and comic book artist who has been published in Nickelodeon Magazine, Pulse magazine, The Believer magazine, New Art Examiner, Arthur, NON, and L'Association's Comix 2000 along with numerous other publications.

== Personal information ==
He was born in Chicago, Illinois, graduated at the Art Institute in 1995, and now works as a newspaper reporter and artist/illustrator. His book Catch as Catch Can was published by Highwater Books in 2001. Cook lived in Chicago for almost 10 years and currently resides in Boston, Massachusetts.

== Career ==
Cook has been experimenting with different styles and subject matters that go beyond the traditional newspaper comics. His new cartoons are about history, comedy, and fictional dramas about daily life. Cooks pieces of art have appeared in venues near Gloucester, Massachusetts, as well as Chicago, Illinois, Cleveland, Ohio, Naples, Italy, and Angoulême, France. In 2003–2004, Cook's work toured the United States with the exhibit "Comic Release: Negotiating Identity for a New Generation". Cook was also a newspaper reporter for more than 10 years. He is now writing and illustrating a graphic novel documentary about American veterans from the war in Iraq. It is supposed to be published by a division of Henry Holt Books. Cook is also the editor of The New England Journal of Aesthetic Research, commodore of The Society for the Preservation of Fitz Hugh Lane, and founder of The Invisible Museum.

== Awards ==
Cook received the "Promising New Talent" Ignatz Award at the Small Press Expo in Bethesda and in Maryland the following year.
