= Highwater Books =

American comic book publisher

- Founded: 1997; 29 years ago
- Founder: Tom Devlin
- Defunct: 2004; 22 years ago
- Headquarters location: Somerville, Massachusetts
- Publication types: Comics, Graphic novels

Highwater Books was an independent comic book publisher based in Somerville, Massachusetts. Highwater began in 1997 and folded in November 2004 due to financial pressure.

== Artists published ==
Notable artists published by Highwater Books included Marc Bell, Mat Brinkman, Greg Cook, Megan Kelso, James Kochalka, Matt Madden, John Porcellino, Brian Ralph, Ron Rege, Jr.

The press was also known for its ironically themed "Marvel Comics Benefit" anthology Coober Skeber, a prolific output of silkscreened posters and promotional materials, a loose association with Fort Thunder (where a number of Highwater artists resided) and Jordan Crane (publisher of NON), distribution of Jef Czekaj's Hypertruck (née R2D2 Is an Indie Rocker), and a few non-comic works of fiction, including a trio of books by Camden Joy.

== Sources ==
- Arnold, Andrew D. "The Complex Simplicity of John Porcellino," Time.com (Jul. 13, 2001).
- Dean, Michael. "Shrinking Alternatives: Is It Just Jeff Mason's Company or Is the Alternative Comic Book Format in Trouble?" The Comics Journal #263 (Oct. 14th, 2004)
- Koepke, Melora. "Bell's Ringing," Hour (Jan. 22nd, 2004).
- O'Neil, Tim. "Teratoid Heights: The comics of Mat Brinkman defy easy explanation.," PopCultureShock.
- Spurgeon, Tom. "Highwater Books — An Appreciation," The Comics Reporter (Nov. 21, 2004).
