= Alex Robinson =

American cartoonist and podcaster

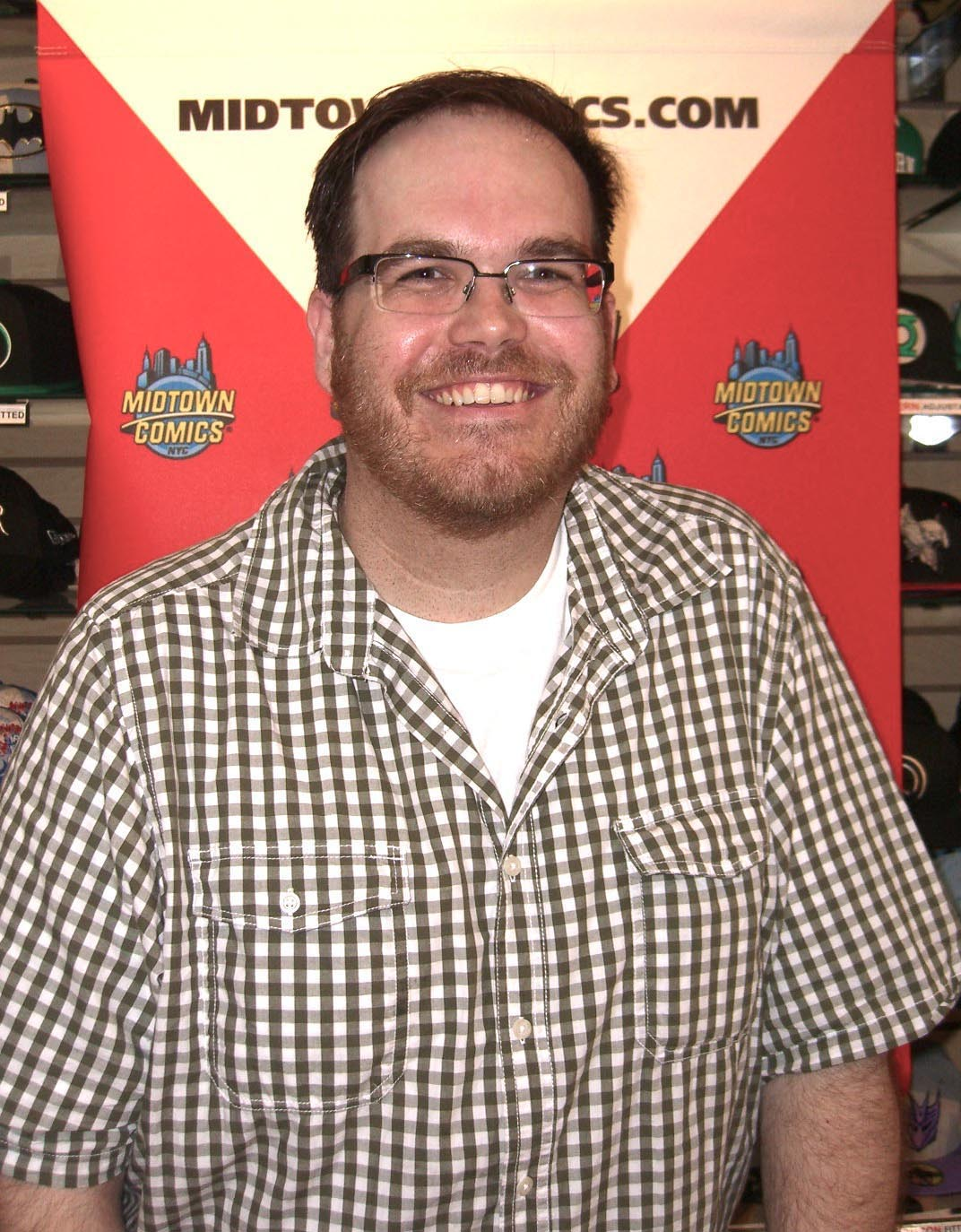
- Robinson at a meeting of the Midtown Comics Book Club, May 21, 2011
- Born: August 8, 1969 (age 57) Yorktown Heights, New York
- Areas: Cartoonist, Writer
- Notable works: Box Office Poison; Tricked; Too Cool to be Forgotten
- Awards: Eisner Award, 2001; Prix Du Premier Album, 2005; Harvey Award, 2006; Ignatz Award, 2006; Harvey Award, 2009

Alex Robinson (born August 8, 1969) is an American comic book writer and artist.

== Early life ==
Alex Robinson grew up in Yorktown Heights, New York, and graduated from Yorktown High School in 1987. After a year spent at SUNY Brockport, he went to the School of Visual Arts in New York City, where he studied under Will Eisner, Sal Amendola, Gahan Wilson, and Carmine Infantino. He graduated with a BFA in cartooning in 1993.

== Career ==
Robinson's first major work was Box Office Poison, originally serialized by Antarctic Press and then collected into graphic novel form in 2001 by Top Shelf Productions. Box Office Poison concerns the life and trials of a group of young people in New York City (the central protagonist works in a bookstore, a job Robinson himself held for seven years.)

Robinson's second graphic novel, Tricked, also published by Top Shelf, was released in August 2005, and both Box Office Poison and Tricked have been translated into French, Spanish, Italian, Portuguese, Polish and German.

In October 2007 Alex Robinson's Lower Regions was released, a 56-page comic about "a sexy barbarian fighting monsters." Two sequels are planned for the coming years.

His next graphic novel, Too Cool to Be Forgotten, a time travel/high school story, was published by Top Shelf in July 2008, with A Kidnapped Santa Claus, adapted from a Frank L. Baum story, following in November 2009.

Robinson's newest book, Our Expanding Universe, was released in November 2015.

Along with Mike Dawson, Tony Consiglio, and a few other cartoonists, Robinson is part of a loosely associated collective called The Ink Panthers. They had a podcast called The Ink Panthers Show which was available on iTunes. The podcast ended in August 2016. Robinson also has a podcast with Pete "The Retailer" Bonavita called Star Wars Minute in which they analyze, scrutinize, and celebrate the Star Wars movies one minute at a time.

== Awards ==
Box Office Poison was nominated for 2001 Harvey, Eisners, Firecracker, and Ignatz Awards. Although the book itself didn't win, Robinson won the Eisner Award for Talent Deserving of Wider Recognition. In addition, the French translation of the book (titled De Mal en Pis) won the Prix Du Premier Album at the Angoulême International Comics Festival in 2005.

Tricked was nominated for an Eisner Award, and won both the 2006 Harvey Award for Best Original Graphic Novel and the 2006 Ignatz Award for Outstanding Graphic Novel. Robinson was also nominated in the Best Writer category for the Harvey Award.

Too Cool to be Forgotten won the 2009 Harvey Award for Best Original Graphic Album.

== Bibliography ==
- Box Office Poison (Top Shelf Productions, 2001) ISBN 978-1-891830-19-8
- BOP! More Box Office Poison (Top Shelf Productions, 2003) ISBN 978-1-891830-46-4
- Tricked (Top Shelf Productions, 2005) ISBN 978-1-891830-73-0
- Alex Robinson's Lower Regions (Top Shelf Productions, 2007) ISBN I978-1603090094
- Too Cool to be Forgotten (Top Shelf Productions, 2008) ISBN 978-1-891830-98-3
- A Kidnapped Santa Claus (Harper Collins, It Books, 2009) ISBN 978-0-06-178240-4
- Our Expanding Universe (Top Shelf Productions, 2015) ISBN 978-1-60309-377-4
