= Box Office Poison (series) =

1996-2000 series of comic books

- Cover of the Top Shelf collection, published in 2001.
- Creator: Alex Robinson
- Date: 2001
- Main characters: Sherman Davies; Ed Velasquez; Beatrice Dorothy Lestrade; Stephen Gaedel; Jane Pekar; Irving Flavor
- Page count: 608 pages
- Publisher: (comic book) Antarctic Press (collected edition) Top Shelf Productions

Original publication
- Published in: Box Office Poison
- Issues: 1–21
- Date of publication: Oct. 1996 – Oct. 2000
- Language: English
- ISBN: 978-1891830198 (paperback)

Translation
- Publisher: Rackham
- Date: 2004
- ISBN: 978-2878270839

Chronology
- Followed by: BOP! More Box Office Poison

Box Office Poison is a series of comic books (originally published by Antarctic Press) by Alex Robinson. It was published in collected form by Top Shelf Productions in 2001. The story concerns the life and trials of a group of young people in New York City.

The French edition won the Prix du premier album (Prize for First Comic Book) at the 2005 Angoulême International Comics Festival.

The A.V. Club named Box Office Poison one of the best comics of the decade. Top 100 Graphic Novels named it as the 84th best comic ever made.

== Publication history ==
Box Office Poison originally appeared in comic book form by Antarctic Press, which published 21 issues plus a special from October 1996 to October 2000.

The collected Box Office Poison is over 600 pages long. Robinson stated that serializing such a long story in black-and-white form was inspired by Dave Sim's Cerebus.

Box Office Poison has been translated into Spanish, titled Malas Ventas; Portuguese, titled Fracasso de Publico; French, titled De mal en pis; and Greek.

In 2003, Top Shelf published BOP!: More Box Office Poison, a collection of previously published stories that had not been included in the 2001 trade paperback, plus a few new stories.

== Characters ==
Box Office Poison features a wide array of major, supporting, and minor characters from many walks of life.

=== Lead characters ===
- Sherman Davies, a bookstore clerk who dreams of being a professional writer. His hatred of his job is never quite enough to get him to quit.
- Ed Velasquez: Sherman's friend, who laments never having had a girlfriend for the better part of the series. Ed has aspirations of being a major cartoonist, which are hampered by the various twists and turns of the industry. Ed marries Hildy at the end of the series, and they have two daughters, Kirby Rose and Marlys.
- Jane Pekar, a cartoonist. Her hatred for Dorothy Lestrade is a recurring characteristic. Her last name appears to reference famous underground comics writer Harvey Pekar.
- Stephen Gaedel, a history professor and Jane's longtime boyfriend. Sherman rents a room in Stephen and Jane's apartment.
- Beatrice Dorothy Lestrade, who goes exclusively by her middle name. She works as a writer at a magazine and is Sherman's girlfriend throughout the book. She used to be Jane and Stephen's roommate, until they kicked her out - as Jane says to Sherman, "She's a slob, she drinks way too much, [and] she's dangerously irresponsible."
- Irving Flavor, a cartoonist and creator of the fantastically popular Nightstalker character. With some help from Ed, he is coaxed into fighting Zoom Comics, the owner of the Nightstalker, for some payback on the profitable franchise.
- Hildy Kierkegaard, the beleaguered assistant of Archie Pupkin III. She strikes up a friendship with Ed that turns into a romance, and eventually they get married.

=== Supporting characters ===
- Nellie/"The Dragon", Sherman's bookstore supervisor. She calls him into her office multiple times to reprimand him for various mess-ups.
- James, Sherman's arrogant 30-year-old co-worker at the bookstore. After he quits his job there, he becomes a temp at a beer distributorship and dates the 15-year-old daughter of his boss.
- Sora Tweed, an elderly, irritable Balkan woman who owns the apartment building Sherman, Jane, and Stephen live in. She ultimately dies of a heart attack.
- Julius "J.C." LeBlanc, the stingy, controlling publisher and editor-in-chief of Zoom Comics, who inherited the position after the death of his father, Simon LeBlanc. His high-powered position and greedy nature has prevented Irving Flavor from receiving any royalties from the enormously profitable Nightstalker franchise; in fact, J.C. forced Irving out of the company shortly after becoming editor-in-chief.
- Archie Pupkin III, a writer for the magazine Comics World who conducts a series of interviews with Irving Flavor about Irving's past.
- Marl and Cookie, two homeless young women who are encountered by each of the main characters except Hildy at various points in the book. After realizing she can no longer tolerate life as a street urchin, Cookie moves back in with her abusive parents, while Marl ends up working as a prostitute and being strangled to death by a middle-aged male client. Near the end of the book, it is revealed that Marl is actually Marlys Kierkegaard, Hildy's 17-year-old sister who ran away from home after Hildy left for college in order to get away from their abusive stepfather, Richard. Although Hildy never finds out what happened to Marlys, she and Ed name their second daughter Marlys in her honor.

=== Minor characters ===
- Paulie, a low-level worker at Zoom Comics who gives Ed the job of assistant to Irving Flavor after higher-up executives at Zoom refuse to publish Ed's comic book series.
- Emil and Mora Yossarian, residents of the aforementioned apartment building. Their last name appears to be a nod to Joseph Heller's Catch-22, featuring a man named Yossarian (and whose first name is later revealed to be John). The book Catch-22 is featured later in the story, reinforcing this idea. Emil appears to be on probation. The Yossarians have a dog and a baby.
- Dylan, a punk rock musician who lives in the aforementioned apartment building. She often holds rehearsals with her band in the apartment building, and the loud noise from the rehearsals aggravates Jane and Stephen.
- Simon LeBlanc, the founder of Zoom Comics who champions Irving's work but unknowingly causes Irving to sign ownership of the Nightstalker away to the movie studio making Nightstalker serials in the 1940s. In 1951, Simon is found dead of a gunshot wound to the head in his office; the exact reason why he was killed is unknown.
- Gromit, Dorothy's pet dog. He dies of alcohol poisoning after consuming alcohol from one of the many half-empty liquor bottles that are scattered around Dorothy's apartment. He is likely named after the titular dog from the Wallace and Gromit series.
- Daisy, Ed's cousin who lives in Costa Rica. She is a proficient figure skater who competed in the 1994 Winter Olympics. Spanish is her first language, and since she speaks very little English, Ed often serves as her translator for his English-speaking friends.
- Professor Herbert Joseph Pekar, PhD, Jane's father and the chair of the history department at Ohio State University.
- Courtney, Jane's cousin. Initially appearing as a young girl during a Christmas celebration with the extended Pekar family, she eventually grows into a troubled teenager due to her father's abandonment of his family and her parents' subsequent divorce.
- Harvey Hitchcock, the editor of Comics World who often works with Archie.
- Elizabeth Pierborne, a news reporter for the tabloid talk show Inside Scoop. Also known by the names Liz Parboni and Elizabeth Pierborne-Smith, she is a former correspondent who previously worked for several entertainment news and political news outlets before being hired by Inside Scoop.
- Greg Davies, Sherman's father who abandoned his family after Sherman's mother became terminally ill.
- Caprice, a college freshman who becomes Sherman's co-worker at the bookstore. Sherman develops feelings for her; while drunk at a party hosted by Jane and Stephen, Sherman kisses Caprice on the fire escape.
- Leia, Caprice's roommate and friend who dances with Ed at Jane and Stephen's party.

== Awards ==
The 608-page volume of the series was nominated for the Harvey Award for Best Graphic Album of Previously Published Work in 2002, and an Eisner Award, Ignatz Award and a Firecracker Award in 2001 and 2002. The French version of Box Office Poison, called De Mal En Pis, won the Prix Du Premier Album at the Angoulême International Comics Festival in 2005.

== Popular culture references ==
Box Office Poison references a large body of media, celebrities, and pop culture characters. Below is a partial list:

- Anna Nicole Smith
- The Beatles
- Betty Boop
- Billie Holiday
- Blondie
- Breakfast of Champions
- Catch-22
- The Catcher in the Rye
- Cerebus
- Dick Tracy
- Eightball
- "Escape (The Piña Colada Song)"
- Frank Sinatra
- Hamlet
- Jack Kirby
- Jailbird
- Jeopardy!
- John Travolta
- Judge Judy
- The Jungle Book
- The Kids in the Hall
- Kurt Cobain
- Laurel and Hardy
- Lolita
- Mr. Snuffleupagus
- Newsradio
- Peanuts
- Shaun Cassidy
- The Simpsons
- Sophie's World
- South Park
- Star Trek
- Star Wars
- Teenage Mutant Ninja Turtles
- This Is Spinal Tap
- This Side of Paradise
- Three Amigos
- Twelfth Night
- Venus on the Half-Shell
- Wallace and Gromit
- Where's Waldo?
