= Tony Consiglio =

American comic artist

- Born: Antonino Gilligan Consiglio; May 28, 1970 (age 56) Brooklyn, NY
- Area: Cartoonist
- Notable works: Double Cross!

Antonino Gilligan "Tony" Consiglio (born May 28, 1970, in Brooklyn, New York) is an American cartoonist. He has had two graphic novels, More or Less and 110 Percent, published by Top Shelf Comics.

== Biography ==
=== Education ===
Consiglio was born in Brooklyn and grew up in Queens, where he spent the first thirty-one years of his life. As a child, he never read superhero comics, but was a huge fan of Mad magazine. At Franklin K. Lane High School, Consiglio took a number of cartooning classes, where he created comics, strips, and illustrated humor pieces. Consiglio attended the School of Visual Arts, where his classmates included his long-time friend Alex Robinson.

=== Comics ===
Consiglio made a name for himself with the acclaimed mini-comic Double Cross!, of which he finished thirty-nine issues.

Two of his graphic novels have been published by Top Shelf Productions: More or Less and 110 Percent.

Consiglio is currently working on a new graphic novel, tentatively entitled Titanius, about a titanium-encrusted man searching for his long-lost son. A short story featuring Titanius can be read in AdHouse Books' Project: Superior (2005).

== Personal life ==
Over the years, Consiglio worked many odd jobs, at such places as Macy's Herald Square, Madison Square Garden, Dean & DeLuca on the Square, and the Beacon Theatre.

At age 31, Consiglio moved with his wife Chris to Indianapolis, where he lived for four years. They now reside in Apache Junction, a suburb of Phoenix, Arizona.
