= Robert Sikoryak =

American artist (born 1964)

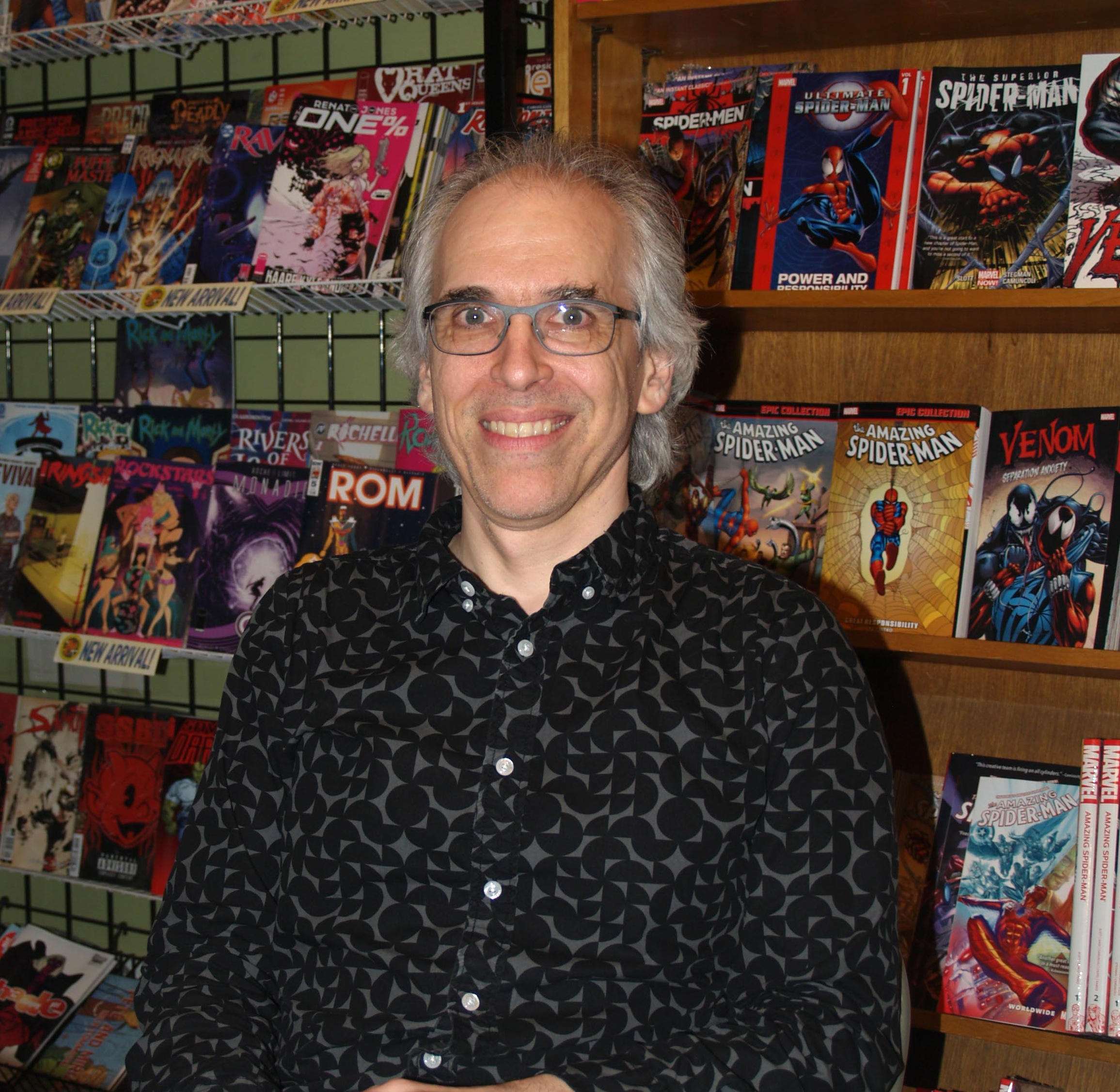
- Sikoryak at a signing at JHU Comics in Manhattan for The Unquotable Trump, on the day of President Trump's 2017 inauguration
- Born: December 4, 1964 (age 61)
- Area: Cartoonist
- Pseudonym: R. Sikoryak
- Notable works: Masterpiece Comics; Carousel; The Unquotable Trump
- Spouse: Kriota Willberg

Robert Sikoryak (born 1964) is an American artist whose work is usually signed R. Sikoryak. He specializes in making comic adaptations of literature classics. Under the series title Masterpiece Comics, these include Crime and Punishment rendered in Bob Kane–era Batman style, becoming Dostoyevsky Comics, starring Raskol; and Waiting for Godot mixed with Beavis and Butt-Head, becoming Waiting to Go.

== Early life ==
Sikoryak was born in 1964. He is originally from New Jersey and graduated from Manville High School as the salutatorian of the class of 1983. He earned his BFA from the Parsons School of Design in 1987, and is on staff at the school.

== Career ==
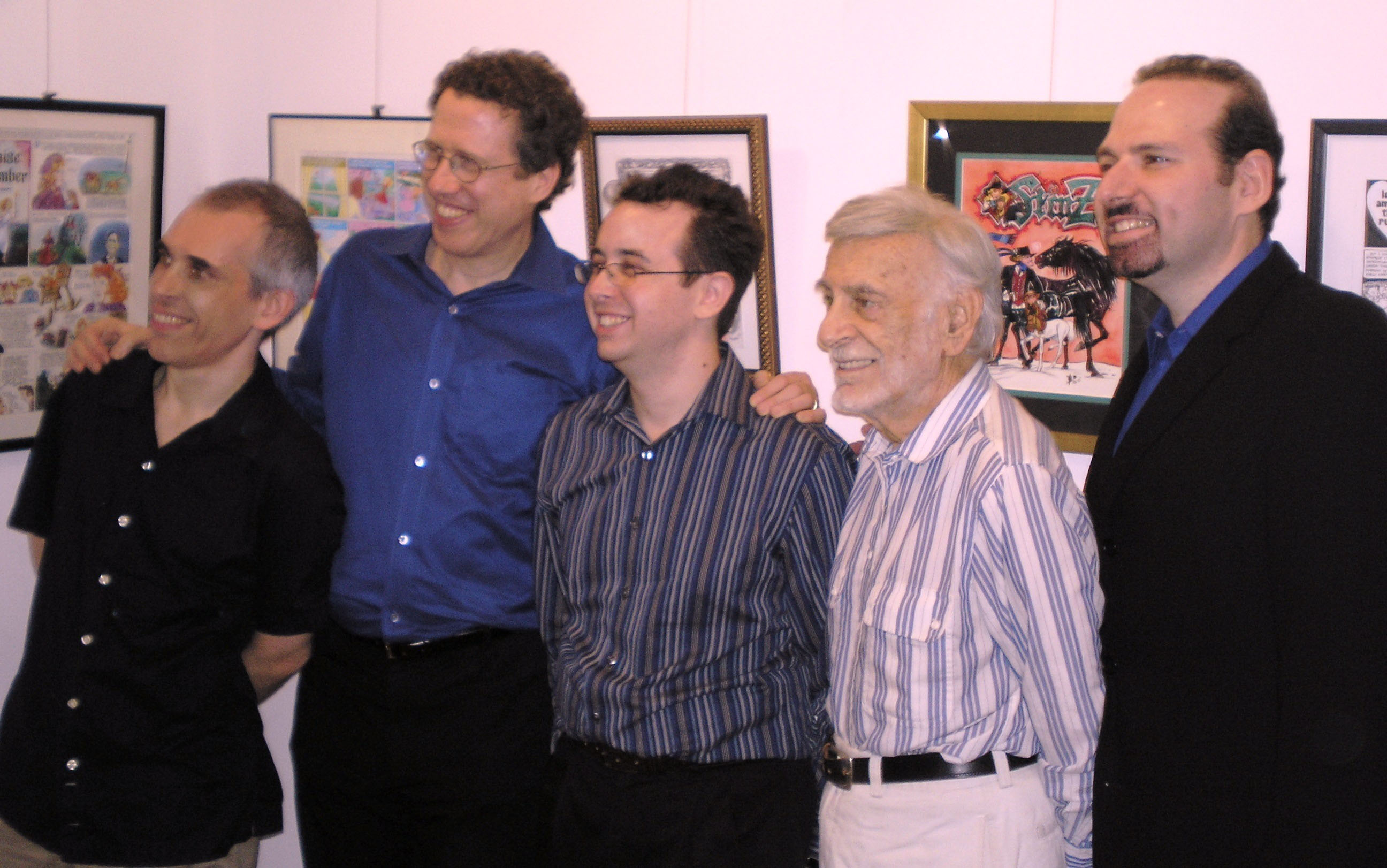
Robert Sikoryak, Danny Fingeroth, Arie Kaplan, Jerry Robinson and Eddy Friedfeld at the Museum of Comic and Cartoon Art in 2006

Shortly after graduating from Parsons, Sikoryak worked on staff at Raw, before embarking on a freelance cartooning career. He co-edited with Art Spiegelman, and contributed to, the comic jam The Narrative Corpse, published in 1995.

Sikoryak's cartoons and illustrations have appeared in The New Yorker, Drawn & Quarterly, Nickelodeon Magazine, World War 3 Illustrated and RAW; and on The Daily Show with Jon Stewart.

Sikoryak is also known for his Carousel series of multimedia comics slide shows, featuring cartoonists such as Lauren Weinstein, Michael Kupperman, Jason Little and himself, which have been presented in various venues in the United States and Canada since 1997.

In 2017, Sikoryak published The Unquotable Trump, a collection of parody comic book covers depicting Donald Trump, illustrated in the style of iconic comic book covers from the Golden, Silver, Bronze, and Modern Age of Comic Books. Each illustration is patterned after the a specific classic cover from series like The Walking Dead and Richie Rich, and drawn in the style of the original artists, who include Jack Kirby, Jerry Robinson, John Romita and Jim Lee. Each illustration is also thematically connected to the line of dialogue spoken by the Trump character, each of which is taken from controversial or otherwise notable comments the real-life Trump made at public events or in interviews during the 2016 U.S. presidential election, such as his comments on Mexico, black voters and torture.

March 7, 2017 saw the publication of iTunes Terms and Conditions: The Graphic Novel, which satirizes Steve Jobs and Apple Inc. Like The Unquotable Trump, each page of the graphic novel is patterned after a page from an seminal comics storyline, and drawn in the style of the original artist, with a caricature of Jobs taking the place of a man character in the sequence, and the dialogue and narration taken entirely from the eponymous contractual terms of Apple's iTunes media player.

== Personal life ==
As of 2017, Sikoryak is based in New York City.

== Bibliography ==
- Raw (1989–91)
- Snake Eyes (1990–93)
- The New Comics Anthology (1991)
- The New Yorker (1994–99)
- Drawn & Quarterly (2000)
- Masterpiece Comics (Drawn & Quarterly, 2009)
- Terms and Conditions (Drawn & Quarterly, 2017)
- The Unquotable Trump (Drawn & Quarterly, 2017)
- Constitution Illustrated (Drawn & Quarterly, 2020)
