= Jordan Crane (cartoonist) =

American comics creator

- Born: September 8, 1973 (age 53)
- Area: Cartoonist
- Notable works: NON; The Clouds Above; Uptight
- Awards: Ignatz Awards (x2)

Jordan Crane (born September 8, 1973) is an American comics creator.

A Los Angeles native, Crane first emerged in 1996 with the anthology NON, which he edited, contributed to, and published (under the company name Red Ink). This anthology combines influences from Art Spiegelman's RAW and newer comics artists. After two more issues of NON, Crane moved to Massachusetts and began collaborating with Highwater Books. (There are five issues of NON in total, all including work by Crane.)

He has four graphic novels — The Last Lonely Saturday, Col-Dee, The Clouds Above, and Keeping Two.

Crane's The Clouds Above is a fast-paced children's story that follows the adventures of a boy named Simon and his large cat named Jack. They battle angry clouds and peevish birds, and elude the grasp of an overbearing teacher, with the effect resonating somewhere between Where the Wild Things Are and The Wizard of Oz.

Crane is currently working on a quarterly comic called Uptight where he presents new short stories and serializes his long-running work Keeping Two. In 2009 Uptight won two Ignatz Awards for "Outstanding Series" and "Outstanding Comic" (for Uptight #3).

== Bibliography ==
- NON (5 issues, Red Ink, 1992–2002) — anthology; editor and contributor
- The Last Lonely Saturday (Red Ink, July 2000)
- Col-Dee (Red Ink, 2001)
- The Clouds Above (Fantagraphics, Sept. 2005)
- Uptight (5 issues, Fantagraphics, 2006–2016)
- Keeping Two (Fantagraphics, 2022)

== Awards ==
- 2000 (nominated) Ignatz Award for Outstanding Comic for The Last Lonely Saturday
- 2001 Xeric Award for Col-Dee
- 2002
  - (nominated) Ignatz Award for Outstanding Online Comic for Keeping Two
  - (nominated) Ignatz Award for Outstanding Graphic Novel or Collection for NON #5
- 2006
  - (nominated) Ignatz Award for Outstanding Artist for The Clouds Above
  - (nominated) Ignatz Award for Outstanding Graphic Novel for The Clouds Above
- 2009
  - Ignatz Award for Outstanding Series for Uptight
  - Ignatz Award for Outstanding Comic for Uptight #3
- 2017 (nominated) Eisner Award for Best Short Story for "The Dark Nothing" in Uptight #5
