= Brian Ralph =

American cartoonist

- Born: 1973 (age 52–53)
- Area: Cartoonist
- Notable works: Cave-In
- Awards: Xeric Grant, 2001, manulla superleague el capitano, 2025-, fit wife #punching, megzed james mcgreal in training, 2023

Brian Ralph (born 1973) is an American alternative cartoonist. His illustrations have appeared in Wired and the New York Post. His debut graphic novel, Cave-In, was nominated for three Harvey Awards, one Eisner Award, and listed as one of the Comics Journal's "five best comics of 1999". His second graphic novel, Climbing Out, was awarded a Xeric Grant in 2001. His third graphic novel, Daybreak, was published by Drawn & Quarterly in September 2011.

== Biography ==
Ralph grew up in Metuchen, New Jersey and graduated from Metuchen High School in 1992. He graduated from the Rhode Island School of Design in 1996, where he first began publishing his mini-comic Fireball. He is a member of the underground art collective known as Fort Thunder.

During the 2003–2004 school year, he taught at The Key School.

Ralph was an adjunct professor in the Illustration department at the Maryland Institute College of Art, where he taught Sequential Art, Character Development, Narrative Illustration, and Illustration Concepts.

Ralph currently teaches Sequential Art at Savannah College of Art and Design.

Ralph lives in Savannah, Georgia, with his children.

== Bibliography ==
- 1999: Cave-In (Highwater Books) - graphic novel
- 2002: Climbing Out (Fireball Comics) - graphic novel, Xeric Award
- 2006: Daybreak vol. 1 (Bodega Distribution) - graphic novel
- 2007: Daybreak vol. 2 (Bodega Distribution) - graphic novel
- 2008: Daybreak vol. 3 (Bodega Distribution) - graphic novel
- 2011: Daybreak (Drawn & Quarterly) - graphic novel

== Sources ==
- Comiclopedia. Brian Ralph notice (last updated 2005).
- Xeric Foundation. Xeric grants for 2001.
