= Carnet de Voyage =

2004 illustrated travelogue graphic novel

Carnet de Voyage pour homme non (Un Americain en Balade (French))
- Cover to Carnet de Voyage trade paperback
- Date: 2004
- Publisher: Top Shelf Productions

Creative team
- Writers: Craig Thompson
- Artists: Craig Thompson

Original publication
- Language: English
- ISBN: 1891830600

Translation
- Publisher: Casterman
- ISBN: 2203396202

Carnet de Voyage is a 2004 graphic novel by cartoonist Craig Thompson. The book is a combination of a travelogue and sketches that Thompson compiled while traveling through France, Barcelona, the Alps and Morocco, during a promotional tour for his earlier graphic novel Blankets. Craig stated that no cameras (or phones) were used to make this book; just his eyes, brush pens and three spiral-bound sketchbooks as well as a couple of auxiliary notebooks for jotting & doodling. The inspiration for this project was Carnet de Bord by Lewis Trondheim. Thompson also documents some of the research he did for his follow up graphic novel, Habibi.

It was published by Top Shelf Productions.

== New Expanded Edition ==
The new expanded edition of Carnet de Voyage was released in 2018. It adds a bonus section titled "Twelve Years Later." Craig reunites with many of the people he wrote about in the initial edition of the book while he was promoting his latest book at the time Space Boulettes (or Space Dumplins.)

Craig used this retrospective to analyze how the production time needed to produce this book differed considerably from Habibi, its successor, which took over six years to craft. By contrast Carnet de Voyage took less than three months to make which also included the production time and sending it to press. This way of working dragged him out of his comfort zone of the controlled studio to become part of more social environments which was often challenging. The 2018 reissue of Carnet de Voyage was published by Drawn & Quarterly.
