= Top Shelf Productions =

American comic publishing company

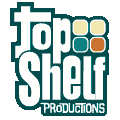
- Parent company: IDW Publishing (since 2015)
- Predecessor: Primal Groove Press
- Founded: 1997
- Founder: Chris Staros and Brett Warnock
- Country of origin: United States
- Headquarters location: Marietta, Georgia
- Key people: Chris Staros, Leigh Walton
- Publication types: Comics
- Official website: www.topshelfcomix.com

Top Shelf Productions is an American publishing company founded in 1997, originally owned and operated by Chris Staros and Brett Warnock with a small staff. Currently an imprint of IDW Publishing, Top Shelf is based in Marietta, Georgia.

Top Shelf publishes comics and graphic novels by authors such as Alan Moore, Craig Thompson, James Kochalka, Andy Runton, Jeffrey Brown, Nate Powell, Eddie Campbell, Alex Robinson, Jeff Lemire, and Matt Kindt.

== History ==
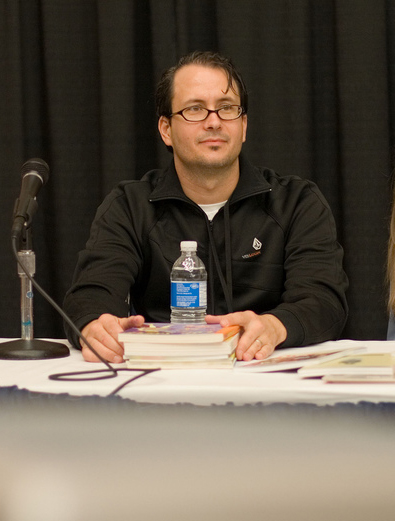
Brett Warnock during the How to Put Together a Comics Anthology panel at the Stumptown Comics Fest 2006.

The company was founded by Chris Staros and Brett Warnock after discussions between the pair at the 1997 Small Press Expo. Previously, Warnock had used the Top Shelf name as the title for a self-published anthology, while Staros had worked in the industry representing Eddie Campbell in the United States and self-published a number of comics-based zines. The partnership evolved from combining Warnock's design skills and marketing abilities with Staros' talents for editing and book-keeping. The duo started publishing under the name Primal Groove Press, but soon changed it to Top Shelf.

The first title to be published by the new imprint was Pete Sickman-Garner's Hey, Mister: After School Special, a collection of Garner's previously self-published comic books along with two new tales. Works by James Kochalka followed, and then in 1999 the company published Good-bye, Chunky Rice, a work which saw its creator, Craig Thompson, win a Harvey Award and which helped establish Top Shelf's reputation for publishing works of merit, with it being chosen as a book of the year by The Comics Journal (#220) alongside the Top Shelf-distributed From Hell.

Staros and Warnock have aimed to give their imprint a style "that is quite hip, but also quite endearing", and Staros regularly signs correspondence with the tagline "Your friend thru comics". The company launched at a recessional period for comics, and saw themselves as, together with Fantagraphics, Drawn & Quarterly, and the now-defunct Highwater Books, attempting to "change the public perception and face of comics altogether". In 2000 Staros delivered the keynote speech at the Ignatz Awards, and argued that the industry must focus more on content, and that more works of the merit of From Hell and Jimmy Corrigan would help the public re-evaluate their perceptions of the medium.

In April 2002, the collapse of the bookstore distributor LPC caused severe financial problems for the company. A $20,000 issued by the distributor bounced. Investigation by Top Shelf revealed an LPC filing for Chapter 11, a move which left Top Shelf in a perilous state: The company had issued checks based on the LPC check clearing. The company called upon the goodwill it had previously established in the comics market and issued a communication asking for help. They appealed to former customers to "find it in your hearts to each spend around fifty bucks ... this would literally pull us through". The communication swiftly spread across the internet, with both Neil Gaiman and Warren Ellis amplifying the appeal through their online presences. The move created such an atmosphere that rival publisher and fellow LPC client Dark Horse felt moved to issue a statement to the effect that they were "in a profitable position."

Top Shelf was unprepared for the response, drafting a volunteer drafted to help pack the orders. A second communication was issued a day later, declaring, "Top Shelf Saved by Comics Community Record 12 Hours." The move was greeted with envy by rival publishers, Tom Devlin of Highwater told The Comics Journal that although he viewed the move initially as maybe "a little pathetic", he later realized it as "the most remarkable marketing scheme", although qualifying that he didn't feel "there was a cynical moment" in Top Shelf's actions.

Top Shelf have slowly expanded their line and typically aim to launch works at conventions in order to generate a buzz. The 2004 San Diego Comic-Con saw the company launch eight books, of which two were immediate sell-outs. This has at times caused unrest with retailers, particularly when Blankets was launched at the 2003 San Diego Comic-Con. The company also followed this route with Alan Moore and Melinda Gebbie's Lost Girls, launching it at the 2006 San Diego Comic-Con. The work had long been on the schedules of Top Shelf, initially intended as a three-volume affair scheduled for a 2002 release. The eventual publication proved controversial, with Moore himself describing the work as "pornography" and Chris Staros admitting that publication was "putting the whole company on the line". Before publication, fears were raised that the book would prove hard to sell given its nature, and that there may be legal implications. However, the work received good reviews and the initial print run sold out in one day. The work has yet to be distributed in the United Kingdom, as the Great Ormond Street Hospital currently owns the copyright to Peter Pan. Top Shelf agreed not to distribute the work in the UK until after that copyright expired at the end of 2007. They do, however, refute that the work breaches the copyrights held.

On January 6, 2015, IDW Publishing announced that it had acquired Top Shelf Publishing. Top Shelf co-founder Warnock announced his retirement from comics publishing, while Staros stayed on as Top Shelf's editor-in-chief.

== Titles ==
=== Pete Sickman-Garner ===
Titles by Pete Sickman-Garner are:

- Hey Mister- Afterschool special
- Hey Mister- Celebrity Roast
- Hey Mister- The Fall Collection

=== Alan Moore ===
Titles by Alan Moore include:

- Lost Girls (with Melinda Gebbie, 2006)
- From Hell (with Eddie Campbell, 1999)
- Voice of the Fire (1996)
- The Mirror of Love (with Jose Villarrubia)
- The League of Extraordinary Gentlemen, Volume III: Century (with Kevin O'Neill, 2009)
- The Moon and Serpent Bumper Book of Magic (with co-writer Steve Moore and artists including Kevin O'Neill, Melinda Gebbie, John Coulthart, and José Villarrubia, 320 pages, hardcover, 2009, ISBN 978-1-60309-001-8)

=== Craig Thompson ===
Titles by Craig Thompson include:

- Blankets
- Good-bye, Chunky Rice
- Carnet de Voyage

=== Andy Runton ===
Titles by Andy Runton include:

- Owly
  - The Way Home
  - Just A Little Blue
  - Flying Lessons
  - A Time To Be Brave

=== Jeffrey Brown ===
Titles by Jeffrey Brown include:

- Clumsy
- Unlikely
- Aeiou
- Every Girl Is The End Of The World For Me
- I Am Going To Be Small
- Be a Man
- Minisulk
- Bighead
- Feeble Attempts
- Incredible Change-Bots

=== James Kochalka ===
Titles by James Kochalka include:

- SuperF*ckers
- Monkey vs. Robot
- American Elf
- Pinky & Stinky
- Conversation
- Magic Boy and the Robot Elf
- The Perfect Planet
- The Johnny Boo series
- Glork Patrol

=== Alex Robinson ===
Titles by Alex Robinson include:

- Tricked
- Box Office Poison
- Bop! - More Box Office Poison
- Too Cool To Be Forgotten
- Alex Robinson's Lower Regions

=== Nate Powell ===
Titles by Nate Powell include:

- Please Release
- Swallow Me Whole
- Any Empire

=== Renée French ===
Titles by Renée French include:

- The Ticking
- The Soap Lady
- Micrographica

=== Jason Hall ===
Titles by Jason Hall include:

- Pistolwhip (with Matt Kindt):
  - Pistolwhip
  - The Yellow Menace
  - Mephisto & The Empty Box

=== Matt Kindt ===
Titles by Matt Kindt include:

- 2 Sisters
- Pistolwhip (with Jason Hall):
  - Pistolwhip
  - The Yellow Menace
  - Mephisto & The Empty Box
- Super Spy

=== Jeff Lemire ===
Titles by Jeff Lemire include:

- Essex County Trilogy:
  - Tales From The Farm (Top Shelf Productions, 2008)
  - Ghost Stories (Top Shelf Productions, 2008)
  - The Country Nurse (Top Shelf Productions, 2009)
  - The Collected Essex County (Top Shelf Productions, 2009)
    - Contains the three main stories "Tales From The Farm", "Ghost Stories" and "The Country Nurse"
    - Added short stories "The Essex County Boxing Club" and "The Sad and Lonely Life of Eddie Elephant Ears."
    - Bonus materials, such as: unused promotion art, a deleted scene, character designs and so on.
- The Underwater Welder

=== Nicolas Mahler ===
Titles by Nicolas Mahler include:

- Lone Racer
- Van Helsing's Night Off

=== Tom Hart ===
Titles by Tom Hart include:

- Hutch Owen:
  - The Collected
  - Unmarketable

=== Rich Koslowski ===
Titles by Rich Koslowski include:

- The King
- Three Fingers

=== Tony Consiglio ===
Titles by Tony Consiglio include:

- 110 Per¢
- Doublecross

=== Dan James ===
Titles by Dan James include:

- Mosquito
- The Octopi & The Ocean

=== Max Estes ===
Titles by Max Estes include:

- Coffee & Donuts
- Hello, Again

=== David Yurkovich ===
Titles by David Yurkovich include:

- Less Than Heroes
- Death By Chocolate: Redux

=== Miscellanea ===
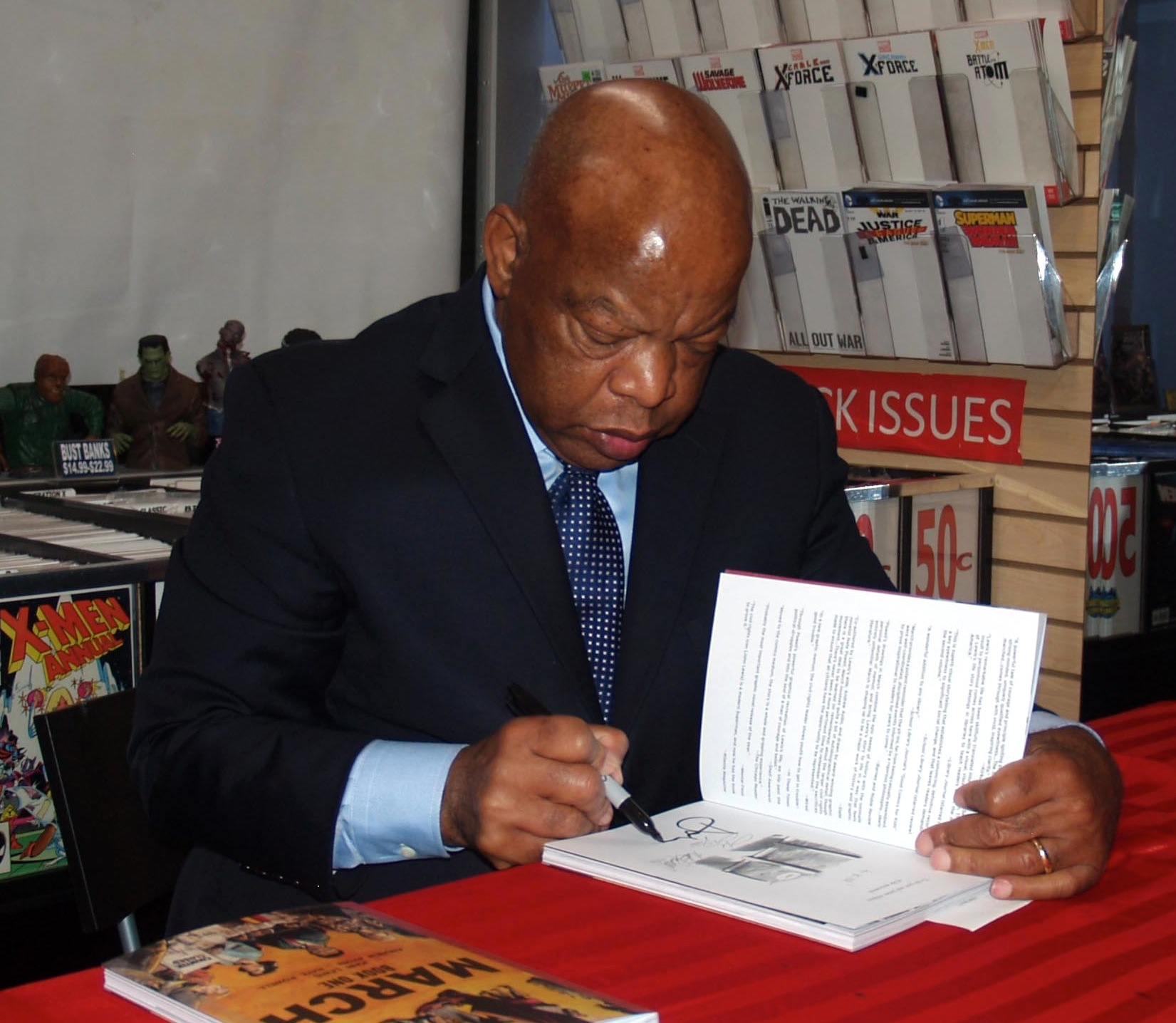
Congressman John Lewis at a signing for his graphic novel autobiography by Top Shelf, March.

Other titles by various authors include:

- AX: alternative manga edited by Sean Michael Wilson
- Barefoot Serpent by Scott Morse
- Cigarette Girl by Masahiko Matsumoto
- Comic Book Artist magazine edited by Jon B. Cooke
- A Complete Lowlife by Ed Brubaker
- Creature Tech by Doug TenNapel
- Cry Yourself To Sleep by Jeremy Tinder
- Dang! by Martin Cendreda
- Discovered by Savannah College of Art and Design’s Sequential Art Program
- Doughnuts and Doom by Balazs Lorinczi
- Grampa & Julie: Shark Hunters by Jef Czekaj
- Keyhole by Dean Haspiel and Josh Neufeld
- Korgi by Christian Slade
- March: Book One by John Lewis and Andrew Aydin, illustrated by Nate Powell
- Moving Pictures by Kathryn and Stuart Immonen
- Regards From Serbia by Aleksandar Zograf
- Same Difference & Other Stories by Derek Kirk Kim
- Second Thoughts by Niklas Asker
- Speechless by Peter Kuper
- Spiral-Bound by Aaron Renier
- Strong Female Protagonist by Brennan Lee Mulligan and Lee Knox Ostertag
- The Surrogates by Robert Venditti and Brett Weldele
- Tales From The Farm by Jeff Lemire
- Tales Of Woodsman Pete by Lilli Carre
- That Salty Air by Tim Sievert
- Will You Still Love Me If I Wet The Bed? by Liz Prince
- World War 3 Illustrated by various
