= Asker (disambiguation) =

Asker is a municipality of Akershus County in Norway.

Asker may also refer to:

- Asker Abiyev, Azerbaijani mathematician
- Asker Beck
- Asker Hundred, a Hundred of Södermanland in Sweden
- Asker Municipality
- Asker River, West Dorset, England
- Asker Seminary
- Asker SK
- Asker station
- Niklas Asker (born 1979), Swedish comic book artist

== See also ==
- Askar (disambiguation)
