= José Villarrubia =

Spanish-American artist and art teacher

- Born: José Antonio Villarrubia Jiménez-Momediano; 17 November 1961 (age 65) Madrid, Spain
- Areas: Colorist, Painter, Photographer
- Notable works: The Mirror of Love; Voice of the Fire; Promethea; Sweet Tooth; Fantastic Four: 1234; Desolation Jones; Cuba: My Revolution; America

José Antonio Villarrubia Jiménez-Momediano (born 17 November 1961) is a Spanish-American artist, comics colorist, educator, and photographer whose work spans comic books, fine art photography, and comics restoration. His collaborators have included Alan Moore, Paul Pope, and Jeff Lemire. He has received multiple Eisner Award nominations and won the Harvey Award for Best Colorist in 2011. His photography is held in institutional collections including the Baltimore Museum of Art, and he served as chair of the Illustration Department at Maryland Institute College of Art from 2010 to 2015.

== Biography ==
=== Early life and education ===
Villarrubia was born in Madrid, where he studied at the Facultad de Bellas Artes of the Complutense University of Madrid from 1979 to 1980. He then moved to Baltimore, Maryland, where he received a Bachelor of Fine Arts, Magna Cum Laude, from the Maryland Institute College of Art in 1983, and a Master of Fine Arts in Painting from Towson University in 1986.

=== Academic Career ===
He taught at Towson University as an adjunct faculty member from 1986 to 1998, the Baltimore School for the Arts from 1997 to 2000, and the Walters Art Museum from 1995 to 1997. He joined the faculty of the Maryland Institute College of Art (MICA) as a part-time instructor in 1997 and became a full-time professor in 2000. From 2010 to 2015, he served as chair of MICA's Illustration Department. Since 2015, he has been coordinator of its Sequential Art minor. He has lectured extensively about art, including at Johns Hopkins University, the College Art Association, Dickinson College, the ICA in London, the Willem de Kooning Academy, the Naples Academy of Art, and the MacWorld UK Convention.

=== Fine Art Photography ===
Villarrubia had a career as a fine art photographer since the 1980s, with work exhibited in over 100 venues across the United States, Latin America, and Europe. His photography is held in the permanent collections of the Baltimore Museum of Art, the Inter-American Development Bank in Washington, D.C., the Tom of Finland Foundation in Los Angeles, and the Leslie-Lohman Museum of Art in New York.

His photography appeared in Allen Ellenzweig's scholarly survey The Homoerotic Photograph: Male Images from Durieu/Delacroix to Mapplethorpe (Columbia University Press, 1992), alongside photographers including Robert Mapplethorpe, Herb Ritts, Bruce Weber, and Duane Michals. He is quoted in Camille Paglia's Vamps & Tramps (Vintage Books, 1994), and his photograps are included in Martin B. Duberman's Queer Representations: Reading Lives, Reading Cultures (NYU Press, 1997). David Leddick's The Male Nude (Taschen, 1998), which has remained in print in multiple editions, and Pierre Borham's Man to Man: Homoeroticism and Male Homosexuality in the History of Photography, 1840–2006 (Vendome Press, 2007), published simultaneously in French, German, and Italian editions. In 1992 Villarrubia's photographs were also reproduced by Fotofolio, a New York-based publisher of fine art and photographic postcards and posters whose roster has included Annie Leibovitz, Richard Avedon, and Nan Goldin.

Solo exhibitions include a ten-year retrospective at the Universidad Nacional Mayor de San Marcos in Lima, Peru (1999), and shows at the Gomez Gallery in Baltimore (1989, 1990, 1995, 1997), Wessel O'Connor Ltd. in New York (1990, 1991), The Trout Gallery at Dickinson College in Carlisle, Pennsylvania (1996), and international venues including Carré VIP in Paris (2007).

Group exhibitions have included Erotic Desire at the Netherlands Photo Museum in Rotterdam (1991), Photo Santa Fe (1994) (juried by Joel-Peter Witkin), Alan Moore, les Dessins du Magicien, Palais des Beaux-Arts de Charleroi, Belgium (2004), Nella mente dello scrittore at Castel Sant'Elmo in Naples, Italy (2006), and Revealed: The Tradition of Male Homoerotic Art at the Leslie/Lohman Gay Art Foundation in New York (2010).

=== Curatorial Work ===
Villarrubia has curated a number of exhibitions spanning fine art photography and comics. In 1992 he curated Sequential Art: Art of the Comic-Book and Out of the Imagination at Maryland Art Place in Baltimore, and served as co-juror with Connie Imboden for Proof Positive there in 1993. He also juried the 60th Cumberland Valley Photographic Salon at the Washington County Museum of Fine Arts in Hagerstown, Maryland (1993). In 1997 and 2001 he curated the exhibitions Digital Daze and Digital Monsters respectively at the Alcazar Gallery of the Baltimore School for the Arts. In 2007 he curated POPE/JEAN, a joint exhibition of work by Paul Pope and James Jean at the Julian Allen Illustration Gallery — named after Julian Allen, the founding chair of the Illustration Department — at the Maryland Institute College of Art.

=== Comics: Illustration and Coloring ===
In comics, Villarrubia has created digitally manipulated illustrations for titles such as Veils, Promethea, and The Sentry. As a colorist, he has frequently collaborated with artists including Jae Lee (Hellshock, Fantastic Four 1234, Captain America), Bill Sienkiewicz (Sentry/Hulk, X-Men Unlimited), J.H. Williams III (Promethea, Desolation Jones), Paul Pope (Solo, Project Superior, Batman: Year 100, Wednesday Comics), Jeff Lemire (Sweet Tooth, Trillium), Kaare Andrews (Spider-Man/Doctor Octopus: Year One, Wolverine, Spider-Man: Reign), Ryan Sook (Spider-Man Unlimited, X-Factor, The Return of Bruce Wayne) and Richard Corben (CAGE, Ghost Rider, Conan the Cimmerian, Starr).

With writer Alan Moore he has produced two illustrated books, both published by Top Shelf Productions: Voice of the Fire (2003) and The Mirror of Love (2004). The latter is a love poem and a detailed history of homosexuality that highlights historical figures in art and literature. It originally began as a part of the AARGH! Anthology in 1988. AARGH! (Artists Against Rampant Government Homophobia) was a comic book protest against Britain's proposed anti-gay Section 28. In 1998, a stage adaptation of The Mirror of Love, directed by David Drake with original music by Chris Mandra, was performed at the Baltimore Theatre Project. The book was translated and published in French as Le Miroir de l'amour (November 2006) by Carabas Revolution, in Italian as Lo Specchio dell'Amore (September 2008) by Edizioni BD, and in Spanish as El Espejo del amor (November 2008) by Editorial Kraken. In 2020 Giangiacomo Feltrinelli Editori published a new edition with a new Italian translation by Marco Rosary.

Villarrubia worked on the comic series Sweet Tooth, coloring nearly all of its 40 issues (written and drawn by Jeff Lemire from 2009 to 2013). From 2012 to 2018, Villarrubia colored the three graphic novels by Anthony Bourdain: Get Jiro!, Get Jiro: Blood and Sushi, and Hungry Ghosts. Sony Pictures Animation later announced development of Hungry Ghosts as an animated series.

DC Comics' prestige imprint Black Label published two series colored by Villarrubia in November 2020: Sweet Tooth: The Return, where he reunited with collaborator Jeff Lemire, and The Other History of the DC Universe, written by John Ridley.

=== Color Restoration and International Publications ===
In 2019, Casterman published Snowpiercer: Extinctions, the first French-language graphic novel colored entirely by Villarrubia. A new chapter of the Le Transperceneige series written and illustrated by co-creator Jean-Marc Rochette, it was timed to coincide with the Snowpiercer television adaptation produced by TNT, which premiered in May 2020. In 2024, Casterman published a newly colored version by Villarrubia of Exterminator 17 (French: Exterminateur 17), the science fiction graphic novel by Jean-Pierre Dionnet and Enki Bilal.

For 2000 AD he has colored two serials: Judge Anderson: Undertow and The Devil's Railroad by Peter Milligan and Rufus Dayglo.

In 2022 he restored the original colors of the original Swamp Thing series, originally by Len Wein, Bernie Wrightson, and Nestor Redondo, for the deluxe oversize edition Absolute Swamp Thing, collecting House of Secrets #92 and Swamp Thing #1–13.

Starting in 2023, he became Project Art Director and art restorer for The Richard Corben Library at Dark Horse Comics, a long-term project reprinting and restoring Corben's body of work, beginning with the Den series.

=== Writings ===
His critical writing on comics includes the essay "Coloring Corben" for CAGE (Marvel Comics, 2002), essays in The Extraordinary Works of Alan Moore (TwoMorrows Publishing, 2003) and Alan Moore: Portrait of an Extraordinary Gentleman (Abiogenesis Press, 2004), and a catalog essay for the exhibition Storie di uomini in armi nei disegni di Dino Battaglia (Comune di Cagliari, 2004), and an essay on Bernie Wrightson for City of Others (Dark Horse Comics, 2007).. He wrote the foreword to Creepy Presents Richard Corben (Dark Horse Comics, 2012), a collection of Richard Corben's stories for the Warren Publishing horror magazines, the introduction to the Spanish edition Creepy Presenta: Bernie Wrightson (Planeta DeAgostini, 2013), and the introduction to Conan, nieto de Connacht (Planeta DeAgostini, 2021), collecting Richard Corben's flashback sequences from Conan the Cimmerian, written by Timothy Truman. As Project Art Director of The Richard Corben Library (Dark Horse Comics, 2023–present), he has contributed an extensive critical essay to each volume in the series. He also wrote the introduction for Koan: Paintings by Kent Williams and Jon J Muth (Allen Spiegel Fine Arts, 2001). From 1992 to 2000 he was a regular art reviewer for the Lambda Book Report, a periodical of LGBTQ literature, and also contributed articles to The Washington Blade, The Baltimore City Paper, and The Baltimore Gay Paper.

As an editor, he conceived and produced several notable publications. He first edited Infidel (Image Comics, 2018), a five-issue horror series written by Pornsak Pichetshote and illustrated by Aaron Campbell. He subsequently conceived and edited Hércules 1417 (Nuevo Nueve, 2021), an illustrated book retelling the labors of Hercules drawn by Das Pastoras, based on a 15th-century Spanish text by Enrique de Villena and adapted by poet Pedro Víllora. He also conceived a new Illuminated Edition of A Wonder Book for Girls and Boys by Nathaniel Hawthorne, published by Beehive Books and illustrated by Das Pastoras, for which he wrote a historical essay about the Golden Age of illustration. The volume also features an introduction by filmmaker Guillermo del Toro and an essay by Kate Bernheimer.

=== Honorary Positions ===
Villarrubia served on the Board of Directors of Maryland Art Place in Baltimore from 1992 to 1994, and on the Advisory Board of the Comic Book Legal Defense Fund from 2014 to 2020.

== Awards and honors ==
=== Wins ===
- 1998: Alex Sidorowicz Award for contributions to the Performing Arts, Baltimore Theatre Project
- 2006: Comicdom Award for Best Colorist, for X-Factor
- 2007: Eisner Award for Best Limited Series, for Batman: Year 100 (as colorist)
- 2010: Glyph Comics Award for Story of the Year, for Unknown Soldier #13–14 (as colorist)
- 2011: Harvey Award for Best Colorist, for Cuba: My Revolution
- 2016: Rankin Award, Robert E. Howard Foundation, for King Conan: Wolves Beyond the Border
- 2017: Carlos Giménez Award for Best Colorist
- 2022: Second Prize in the Spanish Ministry of Culture and Sports' Best Designed Books competition, for Hércules 1417
- 2024: Rankin Award, Robert E. Howard Foundation, for Conan the Barbarian (Titan Comics)
- 2024: Included in The New York Times list of Best Graphic Novels and Comics of the Year for Den Volume 4: Dreams and Alarums (as art director and restorer)

=== Nominations ===
- 1997, 2001: Squiddy Awards for Best Colorist and Best Painter
- 2000: Eisner Award for Best Designed Publication, for Veils
- 2001: Marvel.com Award for Best Colorist
- 2002: Eisner Award for Best Colorist, for Fantastic Four: 1234
- 2006: Eisner Award for Best Colorist, for Desolation Jones
- 2008: YALSA Great Graphic Novels for Teens selection, for Spider-Man: Reign, Crossing Midnight, and Batman: Year 100
- 2013: Eisner Award for Best Adaptation, for Django Unchained
- 2017: GLAAD Media Award for Outstanding Comic, for America and Deadman: Dark Mansion of Forbidden Love
- 2022: Tripwire Award for Best Colorist
- 2026: Eisner Award for Best Colorist, for works including This Ink Runs Cold, Ghostbox, and Dracula Book 2: The Brides
