= Rabbit fever =

Rabbit fever may refer to:

- Rabbit Fever (film), a documentary about the National Rabbit Show circuit
- Tularemia, a disease
- Rabbit hemorrhagic disease virus (RHDV), a disease
