= Doughnuts and Doom =

2022 graphic novel by Balazs Lorinczi

- Author: Balazs Lorinczi
- Illustrator: Balazs Lorinczi
- Language: English
- Genre: Graphic novel; Slice of life
- Publisher: Top Shelf Productions
- Publication date: September 20, 2022
- Publication place: Scotland
- Pages: 136
- ISBN: 978-1-60309-513-6

Doughnuts and Doom is the debut graphic novel by Balazs Lorinczi, published on September 20, 2022, by Top Shelf Productions. It tells the story of Margot, a witch having difficulty with her magic exam, and Elena, a struggling guitarist that works in a doughnut shop. While they have an argument when they first meet, an accidental curse eventually leads to a relationship.

== Reception ==
Publishers Weekly commented positively on the relationship between the two main characters, saying their "genuine chemistry and uplifting, mutual appreciation and support for one another capably epitomize healthy teen relationships." They also noted that the art, which mostly uses hues of blue and "splashes of bubblegum pink", adds to the story's overall tone. Ashleigh Williams, writing for the School Library Journal, criticized the overall plot, especially the antagonist, but noted that Doughnuts and Doom "is strongest when focusing on its main characters' romance." While they praised the overall art and paneling, they said the colors, while appealing, "saps dynamism from a story that needs it."

Kirkus Reviews called Lorinczi's graphic novel a "fluffy, feel-good story" and praised the art and colors used, which matched the "low-stakes, slice-of-life storyline." They concluded by saying the story leaves a bit to be desired as it ends abruptly. A review published on Comic Book Resources commented on the similarity between Doughnuts and Doom and Studio Ghibli's Kiki's Delivery Service, as both integrate witchcraft into a modern world. While the reviewer called Lorinczi's art "a little rough around the edges," they praised his style, calling it "simple and sweet". They also discussed the author's choice of colors, saying it makes sense considering the themes present in the novel.
