= The Mirror of Love =

2004 epic poem by Alan Moore

- Author: Alan Moore
- Illustrator: José Villarrubia
- Language: English
- Genre: Romantic poetry
- Publisher: Top Shelf Productions
- Publication date: 1988
- Publication place: United Kingdom
- Media type: Print (hardcover and paperback)
- Pages: 136

The Mirror of Love is an epic poem by Alan Moore, written in the form of a romantic letter. Sappho, Michelangelo, William Shakespeare, Emily Dickinson, Oscar Wilde, and many others are woven into this rich, visceral piece, which documents the history of same-sex love throughout mankind's history, and comments on its modern-day state. It originally began as a part of the AARGH! Anthology in 1988. AARGH! [Artists Against Rampant Government Homophobia] was a comic book protest against Britain's proposed anti-gay Section 28. In 2004, Moore teamed up with illustrator José Villarrubia, and the duo re-released the work, adding photographs to each poetic passage. It was translated and published in French as Le Miroir de l'amour (November 2006), by Carabas Revolution, in Italian as Lo Specchio dell'Amore (September 2008) by Edizioni BD and in Spanish as El Espejo del amor (November 2008) by Editorial Kraken. In 2020 Giangiacomo Feltrinelli Editori published a new edition with a new Italian translation by Marco Rosary. It was also converted into a stage production directed by actor David Drake.
