= Jeffrey Brown (cartoonist) =

American cartoonist

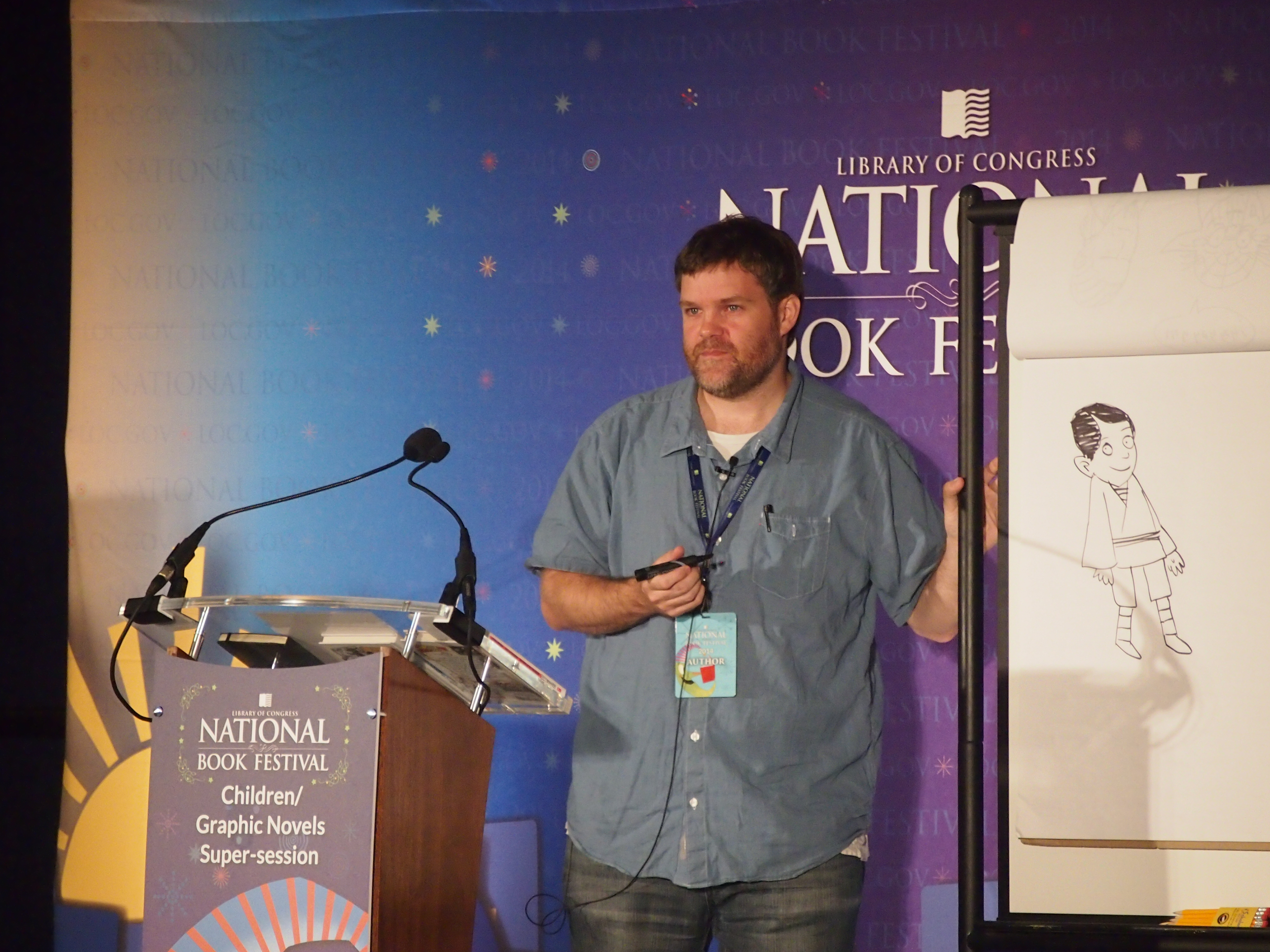
- Born: July 1975 (age 51) Grand Rapids, Michigan
- Area: Cartoonist
- Notable works: Clumsy; Unlikely; Bighead; Incredible Change-Bots; A Matter Of Life; Darth Vader and Son; Star Wars: Jedi Academy
- Awards: Ignatz Award, 2003; Eisner Award, 2013, 2014

Jeffrey Brown (born July 1975) is an American cartoonist born in Grand Rapids, Michigan.

== Biography ==
=== Early life and education ===
After growing up in Grand Rapids, Michigan, Brown moved to Chicago in 2000 to pursue an MFA at the School of the Art Institute. By the time he finished his studies, Brown had abandoned painting and started drawing comics seriously.

=== Career ===
Brown specializes in personal and intimate works detailing moments in relationships. He writes and draws his comics in sketchbooks, and his drawing style mirrors the strain and awkwardness of the situations he depicts. His first self-published book, Clumsy (2002), appeared seemingly out of nowhere to grab attention from cartoonists and comics fans, alike. Brown wrote and drew Clumsy while at the School of the Art Institute.

Established as a sensitive chronicler of bittersweet young-adult romance and nonsensical superhero parody, Brown's current direction remains split between autobiographical material, examining the minutiae of everyday life, whatever humorous fiction he feels in the mood for, and a wide range of fiction subjects in his series Sulk. Brown has also created two series of books set in the Star Wars expanded universe (under the "Legends" & "Infinities" brands).

In 2012, Brown told USA Today that Mark Alan Stamaty's picture book Small in the Saddle influenced his own career and about subsequently meeting its author; Brown's girlfriend (and later his wife) had helped him find a copy.

=== Personal life ===
Brown lives in Chicago with his wife Jennifer, a former Marvel Comics business development executive, and their two sons.

== Comic works ==
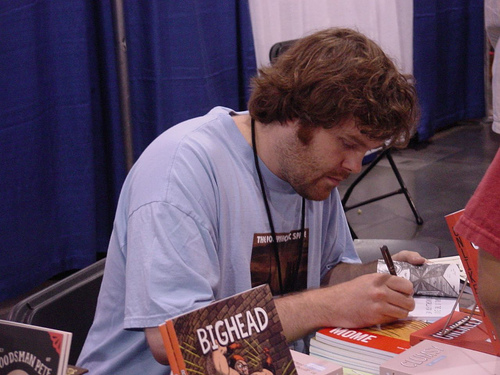
Jeffrey Brown at Heroes Con 20.

Brown's most popular works — Clumsy (2002; the story of a long-distance relationship), Unlikely (the story of how Brown lost his virginity), and AEIOU (Any Easy Intimacy (Over Us)) — comprise the so-called "Girlfriend Trilogy" and its epilogue, Every Girl is the End of the World For Me. More recently, his autobiographical work has included Little Things, and the memoirs Funny Misshapen Body and A Matter Of Life. His humorous works include Bighead (a super-hero parody), I Am Going To Be Small, Cat Getting Out Of A Bag, Kids Are Weird, and the graphic novel series Incredible Change-Bots.

His work has been featured in MOME Summer 2005, Vol. 1, as well as Drawn & Quarterly Showcase, McSweeney's #13, and The Best American Comics 2007. He was also featured in local newspapers such as the Chicago Reader and Newcity.

Brown's "To Phoenix I'm Sorry I Missed You" was published in the Spring 2008 issue of The Florida Review.

Brown has written and drawn nine books set in the Star Wars expanded universe. These include five humorous takes on Darth Vader as a hapless father to young Luke Skywalker and Princess Leia — Darth Vader and Son, Vader's Little Princess, Goodnight, Darth Vader, Darth Vader and Friends and A Vader Family Sithmas — plus Rey and Pals, and three volumes in the Jedi Academy series, which are young-adult novels done in the mixed cartooning and diary style of the Diary of a Wimpy Kid series.

== Critical and commercial reception ==
He won an Ignatz Award in 2003 in the category of Outstanding Mini-Comic, for I Am Going To Be Small.

James Kochalka has called Brown's Clumsy his "favorite graphic novel ever." Clumsy (2002) was originally self-published and was later published by Top Shelf Productions; as of 2007, an estimated 20,000 copies have been printed, according to an interview with Brown in The Comics Journal.

Brown won back-to-back Eisner Awards for Best Humor Publication, for Darth Vader And Son (2013) and Vader's Little Princess (2014).

== Other work ==
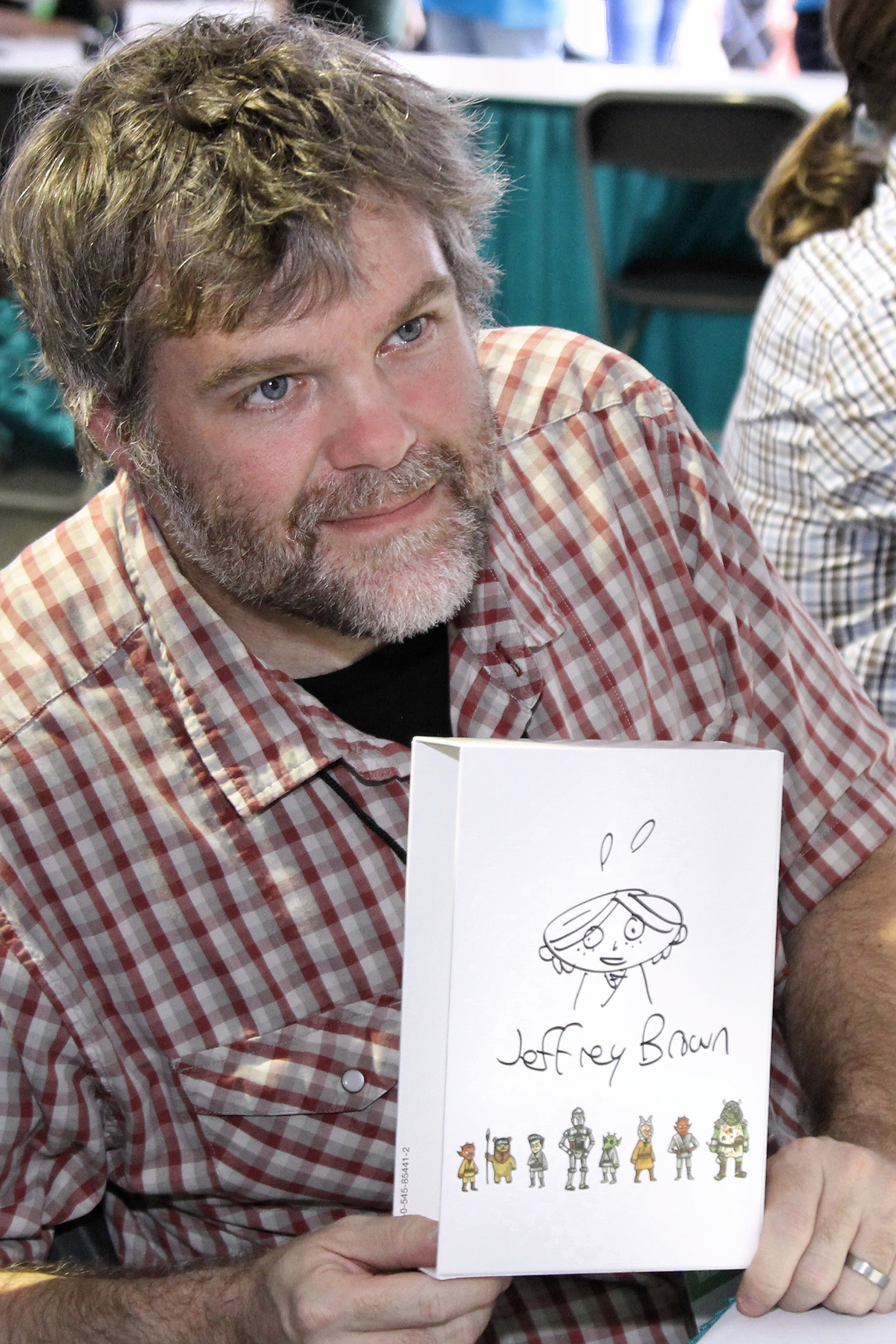
Brown at the 2017 Texas Book Festival

Brown has contributed to NPR's This American Life (April 18, 2003).

Brown directed the animated music video for Death Cab for Cutie's "Your Heart is an Empty Room" (April 11, 2006).

He was featured in Bruce Parsons' documentary Drawing Between The Lines (2009).

He illustrated the movie poster for the feature-length documentary Rabbit Fever (2009).

He co-wrote the feature film, Save the Date (2012), with Egan Reich and Michael Mohan. The film, directed by Mohan, stars Lizzy Caplan, Alison Brie, Martin Starr, Geoffrey Arend, and Mark Webber.

== Bibliography ==
=== Books ===
==== Standalone books ====
- Clumsy (2002)
- Unlikely (2003)
- Bighead (2004)
- Miniature Sulk (2005)
- AEIOU or Any Easy Intimacy (2005)
- Every Girl Is The End Of The World For Me (2006) (included in Undeleted Scenes)
- I Am Going To Be Small (2006)
- Cat Getting Out of a Bag and Other Observations. Chronicle Books. 2007. ISBN 978-1-4521-2621-0.
- Incredible Change-Bots (2007)
- Little Things (2008)
- Sulk Vol. 1 — Bighead and Friends (2008)
- Sulk Vol. 2 — Deadly Awesome (2008)
- Funny Misshapen Body (2009)
- Sulk Vol. 3 — The Kind Of Strength That Comes From Madness (2009)
- Undeleted Scenes. Top Shelf Productions. 2010. ISBN 978-1-60309-227-2.
- Cats Are Weird: And More Observations. Chronicle Books. 2010. ISBN 978-0-8118-7997-2.
- Incredible Change-Bots Two (2011)
- A Matter Of Life (2012)
- Kids Are Weird (2014)
- Incredible Change-Bots Two-Point-Something-Something (2014)
- My Teacher is a Robot (2019)
- Once Upon a Space-Time! (2020)
- A Total Waste of Space-Time! (2021)

==== Star Wars: Darth Vader and Son (series) ====
- Star Wars: Darth Vader and Son (2012) ISBN 9781452106557
- Star Wars: Vader's Little Princess (2013) ISBN 978-1452118697
- Star Wars: Goodnight, Darth Vader (2014) ISBN 978-1452128306
- Star Wars: Darth Vader and Friends (2015) ISBN 978-1452138107
- Star Wars: Rey and Pals (2019) ISBN 978-1452180434
- Star Wars: A Vader Family Sithmas (2021) ISBN 978-1797207735

==== Star Wars: Jedi Academy (series) ====
- Star Wars Jedi Academy (2013)
- Star Wars Jedi Academy: Return of the Padawan (2014)
- Star Wars Jedi Academy: The Phantom Bully (2015)

==== Lucy & Andy Neanderthal (series) ====
- Lucy & Andy Neanderthal (2016)
- Lucy & Andy Neanderthal: The Stone Cold Age (2017)
- Lucy & Andy Neanderthal: Bad to the Bones (2018)

==== Marvel ====
- Thor and Loki: Midgard Family Mayhem (2023) ISBN 978-1797217499

=== Comics ===
- Be A Man (included in Undeleted Scenes)
- Conversations #2 (with James Kochalka)
- Feeble Attempts

=== Significant anthology contributions ===
- MOME Vol. 1-6
- Drawn & Quarterly Showcase Vol. 2
- Kramers Ergot Vol. 4
- The Escapist Vol. 3
- McSweeney's #13
- Best American Comics 2007
- Yale Anthology of Graphic Fiction Vol. 1-2
- POPGUN volume 4
- Bart Simpson's Treehouse of Horror #15
- Strange Tales #3
- Side B from Poseur Ink
