= David Yurkovich =

American writer and illustrator

- Areas: Cartoonist, Writer, Penciller, Publisher
- Notable works: Death by Chocolate, Altercations: Critical Super-Human Encounters of the 20th Century, The Broccoli Agenda, The Bill Mantlo Benefit Book, "Glass Onion", "Banana Seat Summer", "New Santa: Crimson Red"
- Awards: Xeric Award, 1996; Delaware Division of the Arts Literature Fellowship, 2017

David Yurkovich (born 1964) is an American independent writer and illustrator of comic books and graphic novels.

== Career ==
Yurkovich began self-publishing in 1996 following receipt of a grant from Peter Laird's (Teenage Mutant Ninja Turtles) acclaimed Xeric Foundation. Titles Yurkovich has written and illustrated include Altercations, Haunted, Death by Chocolate, The S.H.O.P., and The Broccoli Agenda. Largely out of print, Yurkovich's early work has been published in collected volumes by Top Shelf Productions as Less Than Heroes (2004) and Death by Chocolate: Redux (2007) and the self-published Altercations: Critical Super-Human Encounters of the 20th Century (2014).

In May 2006, Yurkovich began work on the Bill Mantlo Project (a.k.a. The Bill Mantlo Benefit Book), as an homage to Bill Mantlo, whom Yurkovich regards as a major influence. The retrospective, published June 2007 by Sleeping Giant, delves into Mantlo's life and career. It includes interviews with many of Mantlo's former industry colleagues (among them Marv Wolfman, Ed Hannigan, Tony Isabella, and George Pérez) and an introduction by Mantlo's brother Michael Mantlo. Additionally, the project features previously unpublished fiction by Mantlo, some of which was adapted into sequential form by Yurkovich. Yurkovich produced the project as a benefit book; all proceeds were donated to Bill's brother and caregiver Michael Mantlo, to help toward the costs of maintaining Bill's daily care. An updated print-on-demand edition was released in 2014.

Other projects include a self-published photo graphic novel series, Nocturne (2010–2011). In January 2012 Yurkovich announced that Five Years, a 350-page graphic novel, was in development and scheduled for a summer 2014 release. The project remains uncompleted. In 2017, Yurkovich wrote the introduction to the Bill Mantlo White Tiger (Hector Ayala) stories collected in volume 2 of the Deadly Hands of Kung Fu Omnibus published by Marvel Entertainment. Yurkovich has written two prose novels, Glass Onion (2014) and Banana Seat Summer (2018). In 2023 he began serialization of the novel, New Santa: Crimson Red on the Amazon Kindle Vella platform, and the anthology series, Capes and Masks: Superhuman Tales With a Punch. In 2017 Yurkovich, along with author/publisher Dianne Pearce, formed Devil's Party Press, LLC, an independent publishing house that specializes in publishing authors over 40 years of age. Yurkovich serves as co-editor and designer. The company has won several state and national awards including the 2018 Best Short Story Collection by the National Federation of Press Women. In 2020 Pearce and Yurkovich formed Gravelight Press as the horror imprint of Devil's Party Press. In 2024, both Devil's Party and Gravelight became imprints of a newly formed company, Current Words Publishing.
