= Andy Runton =

American writer and artist

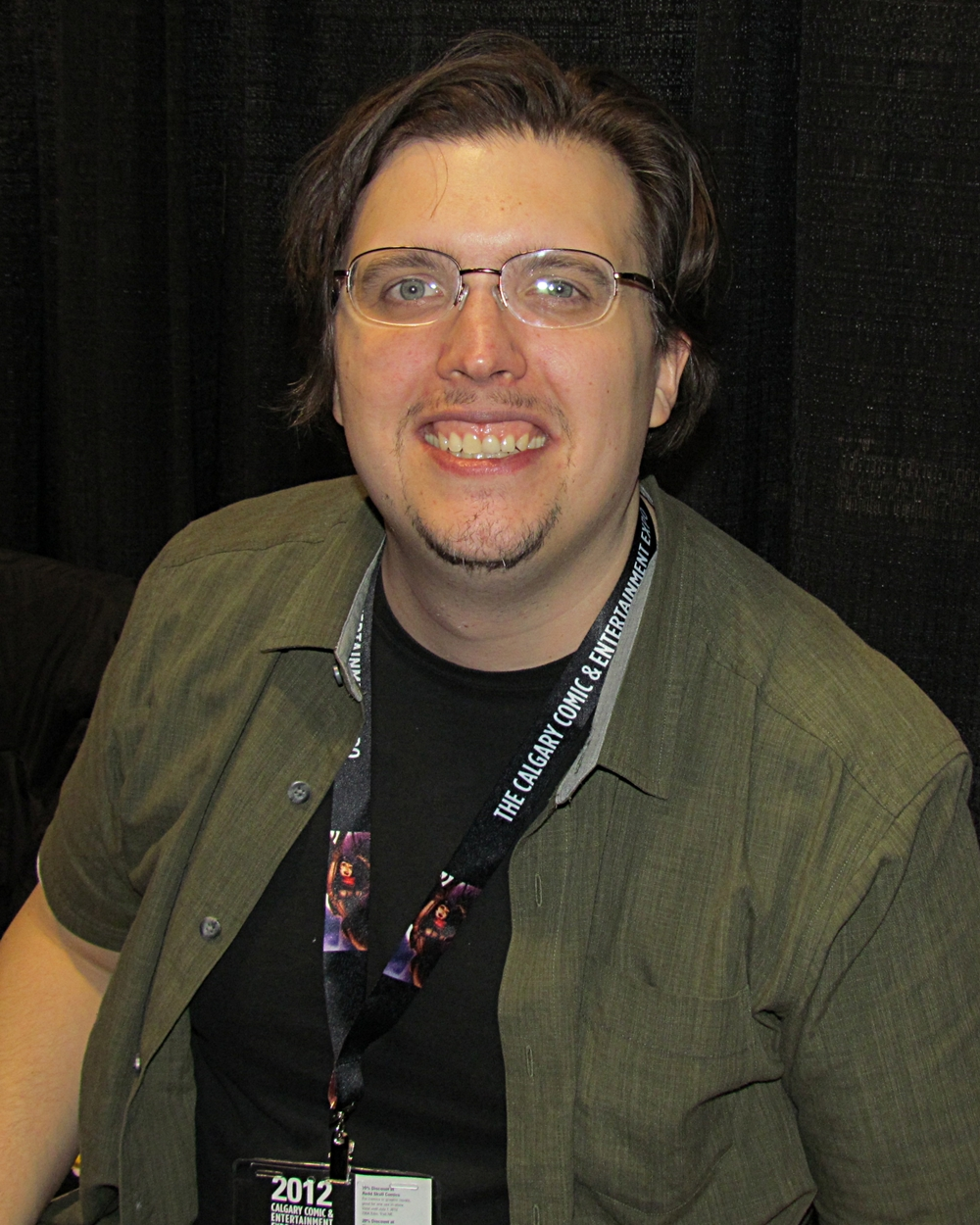
- Runton in 2012
- Areas: Writer, Artist
- Notable works: Owly

Andy Runton is an American writer and artist. He is the creator of the graphic novel series Owly, first published in 2005 by Top Shelf. Before he worked on Owly Runton was a graphic designer. In 2005, he won the Ignatz Award for Promising New Talent. His work was also nominated for "Best Publication for a Younger Audience" at the Eisner Awards the same year, which he won in 2006.
