= Voice of the Fire =

Book by Alan Moore

- First edition
- Author: Alan Moore
- Language: English
- Genre: Historical novel
- Publisher: Gollancz Books
- Publication date: 1996
- Publication place: United Kingdom
- Media type: Print (Hardcover and paperback)
- ISBN: 057505249X

Voice of the Fire is the first novel from Alan Moore, comic book writer. The twelve-chapter book was initially published in the United Kingdom in 1996. The narratives take place around Moore’s hometown of Northampton, England, during the month of November, and span several millennia – from 4000 B.C. to the present day. The 2004 edition from Top Shelf Productions features an introduction from Neil Gaiman and colour plates by artist José Villarrubia. A new paperback edition, retaining all of these features, was published by Top Shelf in July 2009.

== Plot summary ==
The story follows the lives of twelve people who lived in the same area of England over a period of 6000 years, and how their lives link to one another’s. Each chapter carries the reader forward in time, but circles around the centre of Northampton, drawing in historical events and touchstones, before finally segueing into metafictional narrative in the closing chapter, as the author himself comments directly upon the previous chapter’s ambiguous closing line, before relating a personal (possibly fictional) anecdote about Northampton which relates a personal experience of local myth, and features an appearance by his daughter, the writer Leah Moore. Throughout, the image of the fire sparks resonates between the tales, while Moore finds a different voice for each character – though most are inherently duplicitous in some manner, leading to a further commentary on the disparity between myth and reality, and which is more likely to endure over time.
