= Owly =

American children's graphic novel series

- Cover of Owly: Splashin' Around with Owly behind the bush and Wormy on his head.
- Date: 2004 - present
- Main characters: Owly; Wormy; Scampy
- Publisher: Top Shelf Productions

Creative team
- Writers: Andy Runton
- Artists: Andy Runton

Owly is an American children's graphic novel series created since 2004 by Andy Runton and published by Top Shelf Productions.

== Series overview ==
The series, which is largely without standard text dialogue making it a pantomime comic, is about the adventures of a gentle owl named Owly who resolves to do good and make friends in his world with the help of his good companions, the clever worm, Wormy, and Scampy, the gluttonous but good hearted chipmunk. While he faces obstacles in the pursuit of that goal, his faith in the goodness in the world is never disappointed.

== Publication history ==
=== Collections ===
Vol.	Title	Year	ISBN
1	The Way Home & The Bittersweet Summer	2004	ISBN 1-891830-62-7
2	Just A Little Blue	2005	ISBN 1-891830-64-3
3	Flying Lessons	2005	ISBN 1-891830-76-7
4	A Time to Be Brave	2007	ISBN 1-891830-89-9
5	Tiny Tales	2008	ISBN 1-60309-019-3
6	A Fishy Situation	2013	

=== Single issues ===
Top Shelf has published several single issues of Owly, as part of Free Comic Book Day.

- Owly: Splashin' Around was published in 2005
- Owly: Breakin' the Ice was published in 2006
- Owly: Helping Hands was published in 2007.
- Owly: In a Fix! was published in 2008.
- Owly: and Friends! was published in 2009

=== Children's books ===
Runton has published two Owly & Wormy children's books.

Title	Year	ISBN
Owly & Wormy, Friends All Aflutter	2011	978-1-416-95774-4
Owly & Wormy, Bright Lights and Starry Nights	2012	978-1-416-95775-1

== Awards and recognition ==
=== Wins ===
- The Way Home Mini received the 2004 Howard E. Day Prize for outstanding achievement in self-publishing.
- Andy Runton won the 2005 Harvey Award for Best New Talent for Owly.
- Andy Runton won the 2005 Ignatz Award for Promising New Talent for Owly.
- Owly: Flying Lessons received the 2006 Eisner Award in the category "Best Publication for a Younger Audience."
- Owly won the 2006 Ignatz Award for Outstanding Series.

=== Nominations ===
- 2005 Harvey Award nominee for Best Graphic Novel
- 2005 Harvey Award nominee for Best New Series
- 2005 Eisner Award nominee for Best Publication for a Younger Audience

== In other media ==
A computer-animated short featuring Owly and Wormy was produced by Sprite Animation Studios, and premiered at San Diego Comic-Con in July 2009. The short was story boarded by Runton himself, and directed by Moto Sakakibara.

Runton contributed a story featuring Owly and Wormy for the 25th issue of Valiant Comics' X-O Manowar in May 2014.
