= Good-bye, Chunky Rice =

Book by Craig Thompson

Goodbye, Chunky Rice
- Good-Bye Chunky Rice book cover, 6th printing
- Author: Craig Thompson
- Illustrator: Craig Thompson
- Cover artist: Craig Thompson
- Language: English
- Genre: Graphic novel
- Publisher: Top Shelf Productions
- Publication place: United States
- Media type: Print (paperback)
- Pages: 128
- ISBN: 1-891830-09-0
- OCLC: 42966371

Good-bye, Chunky Rice is a 1999 graphic novel about friendship written by Craig Thompson. It was originally published by Top Shelf Productions.

== Publication history ==
Good-bye, Chunky Rice was originally published by Top Shelf Productions. It would be re-released in a new format by Pantheon Books in May 2006. Before this, the graphic novel had six printings with Top Shelf.

== Plot ==
The book tells the story of Chunky Rice, a small turtle who leaves his familiar surroundings, including his deer mouse best friend, to enter the next phase of his life. Other side characters in the novel also experience similar losses of friendship through tragedy or their own choice.

== Critical reception ==
Good-bye, Chunky Rice won Thompson the 2000 Harvey Award for Best New Talent.
