= Bighead (graphic novel) =

2004 comic by Jeffrey Brown

Bighead is a graphic novel written and illustrated by Jeffrey Brown and published by Top Shelf Productions. The title character is a superhero named Khari whose main power seems to be that he has a giant head. Unlike many of Brown's other graphic novels, Bighead is not an autobiographical work, but rather a parody of classic superhero stories. Bighead fights villains like Heartbroke, who built a doomsday machine after a bad breakup so that he could make the entire world as miserable as he was.

The graphic novel collects all the Bighead stories published as mini-comics and one-pagers in other places together with some content that is new to the book.

Bighead was nominated for two Ignatz Awards: Best Artist and Best Graphic Novel. Time magazine named Bighead the tenth-best comic of 2004.

A spin-off comic, The Incredible Change-Bots, was released in 2007. A sequel book, Sulk, was released in 2012.
