= Habibi (graphic novel) =

2011 graphic novel by Craig Thompson

Publication information
- Publisher: Pantheon Books
- Genre: Romance; Drama
- Publication date: September 20, 2011

Creative team
- Written by: Craig Thompson
- Artist: Craig Thompson

Collected editions
- Paperback: ISBN 0-375-42414-8

Habibi is a black-and-white graphic novel by Craig Thompson published by Pantheon in September 2011. The 672-page book is set in a fictional Islamic landscape with "fairy-tale imagery", and depicts the relationship between Dodola and Zam, two escaped child slaves, who are torn apart and undergo many transformations as they grow into new names and new bodies, which prove to be obstacles to their love when they later reunite. The book's website describes its concept as a love story and a parable about humanity's relationship to the natural world that explores themes such as the cultural divide between first world countries and third world countries, and the commonality between Christianity and Islam.

While it has been lauded by publications such as Time, Elle, Salon, NPR and reviewers for the beauty of its visual design and epic setting, it has also been criticized for misrepresenting various elements such as sexuality and its depiction of Arabic culture.

== Publication history ==
Thompson began working on Habibi at the end of 2004 due to the widespread attention given towards the Middle East by the American society after the 9/11 attacks. Although the book is preceded by his previous work, Blankets, which autobiographically explored Thompson's Christian upbringing and beliefs, Thompson conceived Habibi in an effort to better understand and humanize Islam, and focus on the beauty of Arabic and Islamic cultures, in contrast to their vilification after the events of 9/11. In the course of producing the story, Thompson was inspired by Arabic calligraphy, interpreting that form of writing as cursive shorthand for an idea, which Thompson says, is the "origin of cartooning". After having worked on the piece for nearly 6 years, Thompson finally published the work in 2011 under Pantheon Books. The graphic novel has been produced in both paperback and hardcover editions since its initial publication.

== Plot summary ==
Habibi takes place in the present day, albeit in a fictional "Orientalist landscape" named Wanatolia. The story begins with Dodola, a nine-year-old girl who is sold into marriage by her poverty-stricken parents. Her husband, a much older man, rapes her on her wedding night but vaguely pities her for being "just a child". He teaches her how to read and write, which allows Dodola to understand and find appreciation for the Qur'an. However, one day, their home is broken into by thieves who murder Dodola's husband and kidnap her to be sold as a slave. During this captured period, Dodola witnesses the thieves preparing to kill a young African boy, who she saves by, claiming him to be her brother despite their evident ethnic differences. She begins to call the boy "Zam".

Before they can be sold, Dodola and Zam escape from their captors and find refuge within an abandoned boat in the desert. However, to survive and earn money towards food and clothing, Dodola scavenges the desert and prostitutes herself to passing travelers who will, in exchange, give her goods with which to live, which eventually earns her the title of “phantom courtesan of the desert”, with many supernatural myths about her presence. In an attempt to contribute, Zam goes off to search for water at a reservoir but witnesses Dodola being raped by one of the customers before she can leave, which traumatizes him. He does not reveal what he saw to her, and being somewhat attracted to her, he feels guilty over that attraction.

While Zam is out searching for water, Dodola is found alone in the boat by a group of men who kidnap her for the Sultan of Wanatolia's harem. The Sultan, aware of her reputation and allure, makes a deal with Dodola, claiming that he would grant her one wish if she could please him for seventy nights; otherwise, he would execute her. Dodola takes on the conditions of the agreement and is bound to sexual servitude for seventy nights. However, on the very last night, the Sultan claims that he is not pleased with her and imprisons Dodola.

While Dodola manages to manipulate the Sultan into letting her out of prison, Zam, in the reservoir still attempting to find water, is attacked. Zam befriends a eunuch in the nearby village and begins to undertake random tasks and jobs to survive. He becomes a eunuch for the Sultan's court, taking on a more female persona and having his first relationship with a fellow eunuch (which he breaks off after learning she is a prostitute due to his trauma). When he finally goes to the Sultan's palace, he manages to see Dodola again, and her manipulations wear thin, and she is to be executed, but Zam rescues her, and they escape.

Zam and Dodola come across their abandoned boat in a garbage dump. Rather than live in the garbage dump, they decide to move to another place upon seeing the impoverished conditions of the individuals scavenging the garbage dump for survival. They sneak onto a garbage truck, which takes them into the city of Wanatolia - an area that is extremely developed and filled with high-rise buildings. They feign being a married couple, and Zam finds work within the city as a factory worker. Despite their improved condition, Zam's conscience is disturbed by Dodola's previous treatment and his status as a eunuch to the point where he contemplates suicide; after Dodola admits she has fallen in love with Zam, he tells her of his trauma and how that led him to become an eunuch, and he runs away to commit suicide, but he relents and decides to return, and they begin a relationship. The novel concludes with Dodola and Zam saving and adopting a slave girl to protect her from the same fate Dodola suffered and making plans to move out of the city.

== Genre ==
Habibi is considered by scholars and other literary experts as a graphic novel, which falls under the greater umbrella of the comics form. A key differentiating factor for this particular type of literature is the employment of braiding - essentially the function of making connections across the multiframe. It is primarily focused on the relationship of the visual composition within a panel to others on a page and other panels scattered throughout the broader work, such as thematic elements and their significance in reference to their positioning within the graphic novel. Habibi has also been considered as a satire due its emphasis of Islamic influence that is countered by the advent of castration as a means of expressing the "impossibility and undesirability of living as a heterosexual, reproductive male". Yet, Habibi is most typified by the dramatic elements within its panels that lead many scholars to characterize this graphic novel as being part of a Drama-Romance genre.

== Reception ==
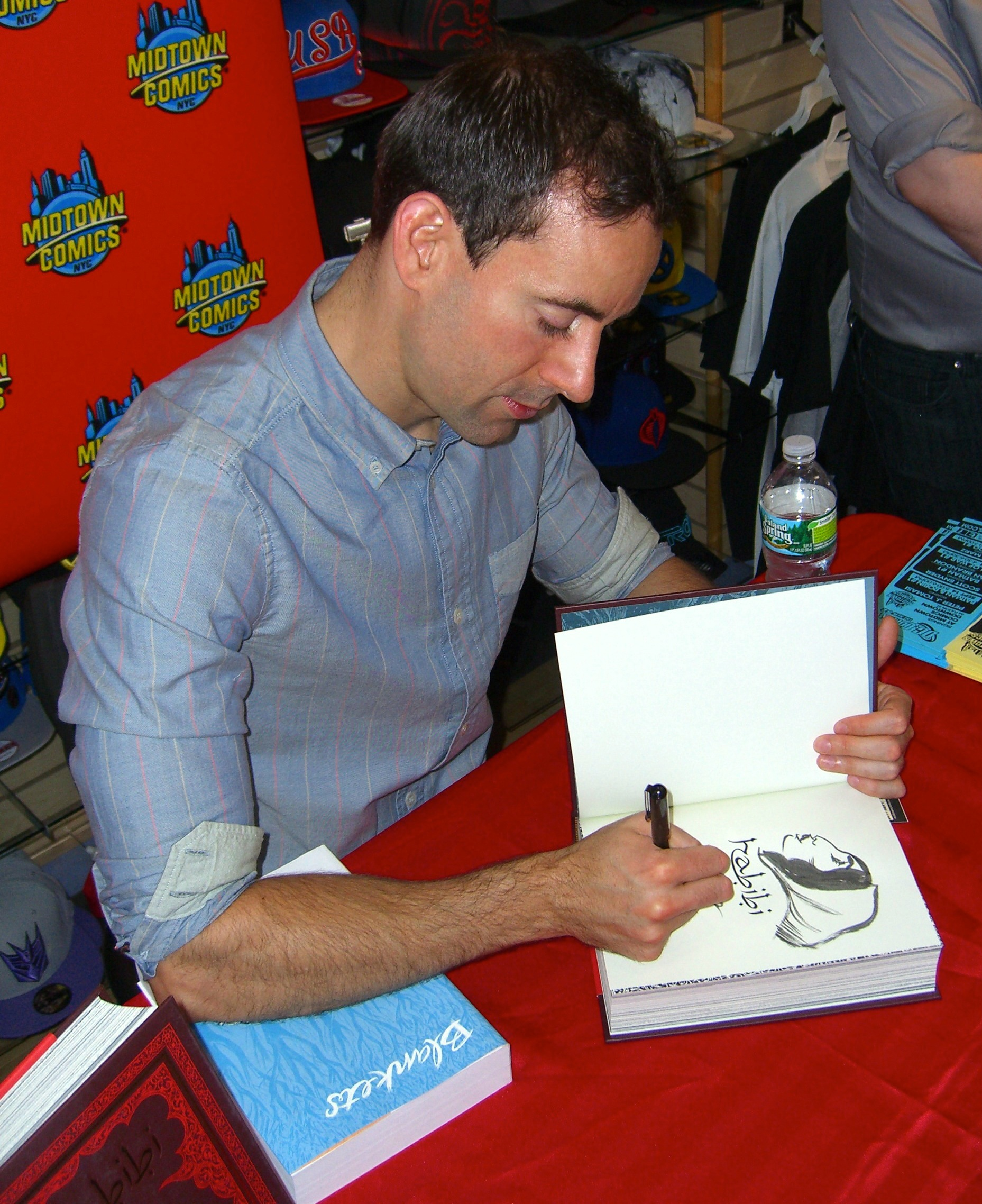
Craig Thompson sketches Dodola in a copy of the book during an appearance at Midtown Comics in Manhattan, on September 20, 2011, its release date.

Douglas Wolk of Time magazine called the book "as grand and sustained a performance as any cartoonist has published... and that every mark on the page can be a prayer". Lisa Shea of Elle magazine wrote, "Thompson is the Charles Dickens of the genre... [and] Habibi is a masterpiece that surely is one of a kind". Neel Mukherjee of Financial Times observed that the book was "executed with enormous empathy and something that in earlier times would have been called divine inspiration." Laura Miller of Salon stated, "a big, rousing, unabashedly tear-jerking Dumas novel, with fascinatingly intricate designs and fabulous tales on almost every page." Inbali Iserles of The Independent predicted that "The book is destined to become an instant classic, confirming the author's position among not only the most masterful of graphic novelists but our finest contemporary writers, regardless of medium." Glen Weldon of NPR commented, "Of all the books I've read this year, the mysterious, marvelous Habibi is the one I most look forward to meeting again." Jacob Lambert of The Millions called the book "The Greatest Story Ever Drawn." John Hogan of the Graphic Novel Reporter commented, "I don't usually look at books in-depth here in the introduction to the newsletter, but I have to make an exception in the case of Habibi", and proceeded to call Habibi "easily the best graphic novel of the year, and probably the decade...This is a work that truly changes the game and sets a new standard for all the graphic novels that follow it."

Michel Faber of The Guardian praised Habibi as "an orgy of art for its own sake", and called Thompson an "obsessive sketcher" whose artwork he categorized with that of Joe Sacco and Will Eisner. Although Faber lauded the book's visuals and its message, he found its length wearisome and its treatment of sex to be problematic, in particular the repeated sexual cruelty visited upon Dodola, which Faber felt caused the story to fold in on itself.

Natalie du P.C. Panno, writing for The Harvard Crimson, called Habibi "exquisite", seeing Thompson's use of Arabic calligraphy and geometric designs as a third dimension that, when added to the familiar graphic novel languages of image and text, broadened the possibilities for expression, perhaps more so for readers who do not know what it means, and must be guided in its interpretation. du P.C. Panno also praised the sensitivity with which Thompson executed his portrayal of Orientalist tropes, particular by the end of the book.

Charles Hatfield of The Comics Journal conducted a round table discussion of the book featuring himself, Hayley Campbell, Chris Mautner, Tom Hart, Katie Haegele, and Joe McCulloch. Most of the panelists applauded Thompson's visual storytelling, calling it "gorgeous", "mind-altering", "lavish", and singling out elements such as Thompson's use of false light, and the "poignant" image of the wooden ship in the desert. More than one panelist compared Thompson's artwork positively to that of Will Eisner, in particular the fisherman from the story's final act. Also praised was the use of Arabic calligraphy and numerology, the intertwining of Biblical and Koranic vignettes as subplots with the main story, the scripting of Dodola's challenge to "turn water into gold", and the parallels between motifs such as chapter numbers and their content, and between the river and blood. Hatfield thought the book's range of themes, from environmentalism to anti-Islamophobia, to thinly veiled allegories about water rights, racism, pollution, slavery and rape made the book "way too big for elegance". By contrast, Mautner in particular thought Habibi was a smoother read than Blankets, which he felt featured too many subplots. Hart and McCullough agreed that Thompson's tendency to delineate every little detail with such obviousness left little to the reader's imagination or interpretation.

The most recurrent complaint was with the book's bleak outlook on life and humanity, and the sexual cruelties inflicted upon the characters, which some of the reviewers thought was excessive, in particular Hatfield and Haegele, who felt that Thompson was condemning such atrocities while simultaneously luxuriating in them. Haegele did not care for the depiction of black characters in the book, finding them comparable to racial caricatures, and calling them "inappropriate" and "disgusting", and pointed to the "cornball" humor in these scenes in particular, and throughout the book in general. Both Hart and Haegele also pointed to palace slave African Hyacinth's use of black American vernacular as implausible. Campbell partially disagreed, saying that much of the humor was carefully used to defuse scenes of tension, singling out the flatulent palace dwarf and the fisherman, which others mentioned they enjoyed as well.

Robyn Creswell of The New York Times called the book "a mess", and "a work of fantasy about being ashamed of one's fantasies", an anxiety that he attributed to American comics produced by white males in general, pointing to elements in Habibi that recall the work of R. Crumb in particular. Echoing some of the Comics Journal round table's complaints, Creswell found fault with the book's depictions of racism and sexism, and its apparent exoticization of the Muslim world without differentiating between fact and fantasy, saying, "It's often hard to tell whether Thompson is making fun of Orientalism or indulging in it...Thompson the illustrator is...apparently unable to think of Dodola without disrobing her...it is a conventional sort of virtuosity, in the service of a conventional exoticism."

Nadim Damluji of The Hooded Utilitarian called the book "an imperfect attempt to humanize Arabs for an American audience", taking issue with Thompson's ignorance of the Arabic language, his depiction of Arab culture as "cultural appropriation", and the revelation in the later chapters of a modern, Westernized city in proximity to a primitive harem palace typified by sexual slavery. Though Damluji expressed awe of Thompson's technical skill, found his artwork "stunning", and the ideas derived from his research "fascinating", Damluji observed that Dodola and Zam are given depth by contrasting them against "a cast of extremely dehumanized Arabs" and summarized the work thus: "Habibi is a success on many levels, but it also contains elements that are strikingly problematic...The artistic playground [Thompson] chose of barbaric Arabs devoid of history but not savagery is a well-trod environment in Western literature....The problem in making something knowingly racist is that the final product can still be read as racist."

On November 5, 2019, the BBC News included Habibi on its 100 most influential novels.
