= Incredible Change-Bots =

Graphic novel series by Jeffrey Brown

- The cover to the first Incredible Change-Bots graphic novel.

Publication information
- Publisher: Top Shelf Productions
- Publication date: 11 September 2007

Creative team
- Created by: Jeffrey Brown

Collected editions
- Incredible Change-Bots: ISBN 9781891830914
- Incredible Change-Bots Two: ISBN 9781603090674
- Incredible Change-Bots Two Point Something Something: ISBN 9781603093484

Incredible Change-Bots is a series of graphic novels written and illustrated by the American comic book artist Jeffrey Brown and published by Top Shelf Productions. The first graphic novel was released on 11 September 2007, and is a parody of the shape-changing robot genre, described by Brown as being "part parody, part nostalgic tribute and part moral fable". A sequel was released in 2011.

== Creation ==
Brown credits the initial inspiration as being an incident in high school where a friend joked that the soundtrack album of The Transformers: The Movie consisted of an hour of "chee choo chee choo chook" sound effects, something which stuck with the artist and led to the Incredible Change-Bots' distinctive onomatopoeia. He revisited the idea in Sulk Sketchbook #10 in January 2004. Transformers and GoBots toys Brown owned as a child were also an inspiration.

== Publication history ==
News of the book's release broke in June 2007, just as Michael Bay's first Transformers movie was about to be released. The first release was a 144-page digest format graphic novel, on 11 September 2007. The book was previewed by an exclusive strip in Wizard. In 2010 an exclusive Christmas-themed strip was produced for Comic Book Resources.

A sequel called Incredible Change-Bots Two followed in 2011. Announced at the C2E2 convention, it was again previewed with a strip in Wizard, which appeared in the final print edition of the magazine. Another exclusive strip was created for ComicsAlliance. In the run-up to the sequel's release Brown's artwork for the book was the subject of a month-long exhibition at the Scott Eder Gallery in New York. He stated the fun he had making the first version and the positive reception to the characters was a factor in making the sequel.

In 2014 a collection of short strips and other material was released as Incredible Change-Bots Two Point Something Something. This compiled material produced for the fan club, the online strips, the Scott Eder Gallery Show and numerous other sources, and included additional commentary and notes from Brown.

== Synopsis ==
=== Incredible Change-Bots: More Than Just Machines! ===
On the planet of Electrocybercircuitron machines have evolved into sentient beings called the Incredible Change-Bots. They are named such due to their ability to Incredible Change from robots to vehicles or other objects. The population of Electrocybercircuitron is split into two ideological groups, the Awesomebots, led by Big Rig, and Fantasticons, led by Shootertron. The latter tamper with senate elections and take control of the planet, and the resulting heavily armed peaceful protest mounted by the Awesomebots soon escalates into civil war. The long conflict leaves Electrocybercircuitron drained, so both factions work together to build a ship and set off into space to find a new source of energy.

The truce soon breaks down, causing the ship to crash on Earth. Like all alien spacecraft it lands in a remote North American desert, and the Fantasticons leave the ship to set up a base called the Fantasticave in a nearby mountain. Realising that their Incredible Change ability gives them the perfect disguise, the Awesomebots go looking for them - but are wary due to many of Earth's machines due to them carrying organic infestation. During a skirmish the Awesomebot called Balls goes missing. He is found by human mechanics Jimmy Junior and his father Monkeywrench. They help repair him and befriend the Awesomebots. Shootertron also makes an alliance, with General Deeyer and the army. They pleasure each other by exchanging Incredible Change-Bot technology for supplies of energy. In the resulting battle the Awesomebot Arsonal is destroyed. Monkeywrench is able to repair him, and the Fantasticon spy Microwave tells Shootertron they ask for nothing in exchange.

Enraged with Deeyer, he sends Rusty and Gasser to find him. Due to there being two General Deeyers the errand takes them two years. They try to get him to ally the army to the Fantasticons but the Awesomebots thwart this by ramming Deeyer's car, badly injuring him. However the Awesomebots are betrayed when Siren, one of their own, shoots her lover Honkytonk. To reverse their fortunes, Awesomebot Eject devises a plan to construct a Solar-Turbine Power Converter to gather energy. However, their plans are overheard by Fantasticon spy Microwave and after setting up the Converter in the South American jungle the Awesomebots are ambushed - with Arsonal getting shot again. The Fantasticons' new ally Dr. Infallible unleashes his new origami creation Papercut, which kills Monkeywrench. The Awesomebots return to Awesomebase in low spirits, and shortly after Honkytonk and Siren destroy each other in a brief shoot-out. Fed up of Big Rig's repeated incompetence, the Awesomebots decide they want a change of leadership - especially after Eject reveals Big Rig is Shootertron's brother. Big Rig is impeached into the desert, swiftly becoming delirious before being found by the Fantasticons, who convince him to join them.

The Awesomebots, having elected Stinky as their new leader, track Big Rig to a dam and battle is joined. Big Rig rejoins the Awesomebots and knocks Shootertron off the dam, the Fantasticon refusing to be rescued due to belief his opposite number will use him to shoot himself. As the fight rages Gasser has an existential crisis and douses the dam in petrol before setting it off. Between the battle and the explosion only a few survivors are left. After Rusty reveals they weren't there to steal energy but just to see the view. They band together and repair the ship before leaving Earth - and an awkwardly emotional Jimmy Junior - behind.

In an epilogue construction workers begin to clear the debris of the dam, revealing Shootertron.

=== Incredible Change-Bots Two: The Vengeful Return of the Broken ===
Three years later, an amnesiac Shootertron digs himself free and is adopted by the Dards, a kindly couple of farmers called Stanley - who calls him "big guy" - and Edna. Despite being a gigantic robot he is enrolled in the local high school, becoming a key player in the football team. He rediscovers his powerful gun when protecting Stanley from Tracktor, which Shootertron has mistaken for a sinister presence due to pareidolia; runs a successful campaign of terror in order to be elected Class president; and begins dreaming of the war between the Awesomebots and Fantasticons. However his school rival alerts General Deeyer to Shootertron's whereabouts, and he is captured by agents of a Washington think tank. Deeyer's scientists try to harness Shootertron's powers, eventually reawakening his memory.

Meanwhile, in space the Change-Bots' ship is coming up to Jupiter. Big Rig proposes they formalise their alliance with a triumvirate of leaders - himself, Eject and Rusty - while medic Ivy is gradually restoring destroyed Change-Bots to life. However Calculatron has only double-checked their trajectory despite Big Rig's request he triple-check it, and the ship goes off course, back towards Earth. Even though the ship is totally destroyed on impact everyone survives unharmed.

Desiring revenge, Shootertron decides to work with Deeyer to destroy the Change-Bots, and leads a planning session to map the battlefield using pirate-themed interlocking bricks. They confront Big Rig and a battle breaks out. The Change-Bots find their lasers are useless as Eject sold the idea of using mirrors to deflect them to the military before they left Earth. However, Eject and Rusty soon hit on the idea of just punching the soldiers. The army is driven off and the Awesomebots and Fantasticons begin squabbling as to whether it counts as a victory as the enemy weren't finished off. The Fantasticons leave and head back to the Fantasticave, where Shootertron is waiting and retakes command. While the Awesomebots receive a visit from Jimmy Junior and Monkeywrench. Initially, Big Rig is perplexed by Monkeywrench being alive until Eject suggests they might be time-travellers and the Awesomebots decide to go with it.

Shootertron proposes arbitration and the Awesomebots meet with the Fantasticons, taking Jimmy Junior and Monkeywrench along after the former points out to Big Rig they can be used as human shields. Shootertron's lawyers tell Big Rig he and the Awesomebots have 48 hours to submit to his control or be wiped out. Both sides throw new creations into the fight - the tiny annoying Fantastinsectors, the giant Awesomesauruses and the huge Macrowave- but the key tussle is once again between Big Rig and Shootertron. However, the Fantasticon leader refuses to fight after Big Rig calls him "big guy", reminding of his time with the Dards. He apologises to Big Rig and both groups reconcile.

In the epilogue, the two groups move into the new Fantasticawesome complex, rapidly become bored and start squabbling about minor things.

== Characters ==
=== Awesomebots ===
- Big Rig: the leader of the Awesomebots, and brother of Shootertron. As his name would suggest he Incredible Changes into a truck cab. While he is strong and courageous, Big Rig is also by turn selfish, petty, melodramatic and egotistical, often demonstrating a lack of interest and empathy in his allies.
- Eject: de facto second-in-command, Eject is widely recognised as the brains of the operation. Often proactive and behind most of their plans, he is aware that Big Rig is highly flawed. He Incredible Changes into a portable cassette deck. While he is passed over as leader when Stinky is elected after Big Rig's impeachment this is acknowledged as being because whoever was chosen would be a puppet of Eject anyway.
  - He has two cassette sidekicks, Steggy and Buzzy.
- Stinky: a dumb but valiant warrior who Incredible Changes into a garbage truck. As a result, he has a penchant for one-liners that are slight variations on "taking out the trash", much to the irritation of his team-mates. He briefly leads the Awesomebots during Big Rig's exile, despite what Headlight describes as "his obvious flaws". He later repurposes his vehicle mode as a recycling truck and develops more sociopathic banter.
- Balls: the smallest Awesomebot, the plucky Balls Incredible Changes into a golf cart. He becomes fast friends with human Jimmy Junior, though at times the boy's clingy behaviour embarrasses him. Although largely brave, he spends the battle on the dam hiding with Jimmy Junior. One of the fan club strips suggests he could be the son of Big Rig.
- Racey: a warrior who Incredible Changes into a sports car. While the others treat him like an over-eager hot-headed youth, Racey is frequently shown to be one of the few competent Awesomebots.
- Honkytonk: a warrior who Incredible Changes into a pickup truck. He is in a sexual and noisy relationship with team-mate Siren, and spirals into depression whenever their love-life hits trouble. The pair destroy each other, but are rebuilt by Ivy and reconcile.
- Siren: a warrior who Incredible Changes into a police car. She was formerly in a relationship with the Fantasticon Rusty. She betrays the Awesomebots for no readily apparent reason, injuring her lover Honkytonk in the process. Before she can explain to Honkytonk, he attacks her and both are blown up in the fight. Siren is later rebuilt by Ivy.
- Ivy: the medical officer who Incredible Changes into an ambulance. She is usually seen fixing up casualties in Awesomebase's repair bay, and has a brief and easily resolved moral quandary about whether it's right to play God with her patients. She harbours a secret crush on Honkytonk.
- Old Timey: a warrior who Incredible Changes into a probably-vintage car. Old Timey is uninterested in fighting, being more concerned with his ongoing slide into senility. His fellow Awesomebots generally ignore both of these things, and he gets dragged along on their adventures despite his protests.
- Headlight: a warrior who Incredible Changes into a saloon car. He has a light on his head. Headlight is one of the more cynical and perceptive members of the team, but generally keeps his thoughts to himself and just goes along with the other Awesomebots.
- Arsonal: a warrior who Incredible Changes into a helicopter. Noted for being obnoxious by his team-mates, he is also frequently heavily damaged. After being seemingly killed by Shootertron, he is repaired by Monkeywrench and retitled Extra Battle Damaged Arsonal. His fortunes do not change much and he dies again battling the army, throwing himself in front of a barrage of enemy fire for no reason.
- Hoser: a warrior who Incredible Changes into a fire engine. Hoser is seemingly killed battling Rusty at the dam, but returns after a redesign in time for the Change-Bots' second visit to Earth.
- Calculatron: an official from Electrocybercircuitron who first tallies the results of the fateful election. It is not shown what he Incredible Changes into but he probably Incredible Changes into a calculator. He later turns up on the Change-Bots' ship after they leave Earth for the first time, and his decision to eschew making the correct course calculations (seemingly just to facilitate a pun) ensures their swift return. As his main strength is counting, it is shown in a fanclub comic that he fears being replaced by a graphing calculator.
- Laptopor: a diminutive Awesomebot who Incredible Changes into a laptop. Jimmy Junior is able to use him to hack government records, give away the Awesomebots' strategy on social network Spacebook and watch robot pornography.
- Shadow XGX-9: a cheerful but overlooked warrior who Incredible Changes into a car. He attempts to reminisce with Jimmy Junior and Monkeywrench about their adventures together - only for neither to remember who he is, leaving the exchange to trail off into awkward silence.
- Awesomesauruses: a trio of powerful Change-Bots shaped like Earth dinosaurs who are suddenly brought into action during the final battle between the Awesomebots and Fantasticons. Jitters questions whether they were found buried underground, but Hoser and Headlight point out that they just built them because they "looked cool".

=== Fantasticons ===
- Shootertron: leader of the Fantasticons and brother of Big Rig. Shootertron Incredible Changes into a handgun. He is less inept than his opposite number but still given to childish behaviour and poor treatment of his men, and often shoots them with his arm-mounted cannon with little provocation. Despite being a robot, he does not know binary code.
- Wheeeee: the would-be second-in-command of the Fantasticons who makes no secret of his desire to take over leadership. Wheee can Incredible Change into a motorcycle, and declares himself leader of the Fantasticons on the flimsiest of pretences, including one time when Shootertron merely fell over. He gets the opportunity to lead for real after Shootertron is seemingly killed in the battle on the dam and promptly decides he doesn't want to do it. Wheeeee later takes control briefly after the Fantasticons split from the Awesomebots after their return to Earth, only to be immediately deposed by the returning Shootertron. He points a lot.
- Rusty: a generally level-headed Fantasticon who Incredible Changes into a minivan. He is one of the more competent characters, and describes Shootertron as his best friend. Rusty takes over as the effective leader of the Fantasticons after the battle at the dam; as such he gets elected to the ruling council and begins to pick up Awesomebot rhetoric, resulting in much sledging from other Fantasticons.
- Microwave: the team's spy, who Incredible Changes into a microwave oven. He is repeatedly left high and dry by Shootertron whenever he is discovered by the Awesomebots or otherwise needs extraction.
  - He has two diminutive minions, Soupy and Popper, who incredible change into a tub of soup and a bag of popcorn respectively.
- Gasser: a warrior who Incredible Changes into a petrol tanker truck. Overcome by a sudden nihilistic moment in the climactic battle on the dam, he sprays petrol from his tank everywhere and sets it on fire, blowing up himself and several other Change-Bots. Nevertheless, he turns up again for the second climactic battle.
- Cementor: a warrior who Incredible Changes into a cement mixer truck. During an exercise to improve the appalling aim of the Fantasticons, he turns out to have perfect aim, though Shootertron shoots him anyway for it not being "perfect enough". Other than that his main forte is building fortifications mid-battle, a skill he hopes will impress Shootertron.
- Bushwhacky: a warrior who Incredible Changes into a mini-van. Bushwacky speaks in a stereotypical Southern accent, wears a cowboy hat and dual wields a pair of blasters. He also has a blast shield to cover his eyes, which he occasionally fails to remember to retract. After the conclusion of the battles on Earth he comes up with the idea of faction insignia for the Awesomebots and Fantasticons, to general apathy - until Shootertron blows a hole through him with non-fatal results.
- Dozer: a warrior who Incredible Changes into a bulldozer. He is shot in the back by Racey in the battle at the dam and then in the front by Eject but later reappears on the Change-Bots' ship. As the alliance frays Dozer gets berated by Big Rig for Incredible Changing and spoiling his new car carrier trailer. Despite his prosaic name and function he actually has an interest in pondering the philosophies of life.
- Tredz: a warrior who Incredible Changes into a tank. Tredz survives the dam battle on Earth but is dismembered by Stinky in the second big fight. Unlike Dozer all he thinks about is shooting things.
- Sparky: a technician who Incredible Changes into a transformer. His tampering allows the Fantasticons to win the last election on Electrocybercircuitron. Due to his small size he has an attitude problem, but later helps Ivy patch up some of the casualties from the fighting on Earth.
- Jitters: a warrior who Incredible Changes into a car. He is shot in the chest in the dam battle and then blown up by Gasser, later getting stomped by one of the Awesomesauruses but still survives the conflict.
- Afterburnerbot: an aerial warrior who Incredible Changes into a jet. He has his head blown off by Eject but is restored to life by Ivy. However he reduced to just a head, and while Afterburnerbot can still fly he is less than impressed with not having a body.
- Papercut: created by Dr. Infallible out of hyper-tensile titanium, Paper Cut can Incredible Change into anything due to the ancient martial art of origami. As a crane, Papercut cannot be combatted by the Awesomebots and kills Monkeywrench, only to be promptly caught and neutralised by a passing leopard.
- Rejector: a warrior who Incredible Changes into a VCR, he is a source of irritation to Eject, who believes the Fantasticon is ripping off his name.
  - He has a minion named Tapey, who Incredible Changes into a videocassette but succumbs to damage when launched.
- Fantastinsectors: a squad of insectoid warriors unleashed during the final battle on Earth. However, being insect-sized their weapons are merely annoying and after initial panic the Awesomebots simply ignore them.
- Macrowave: a gigantic warrior who needs to be dragged into battle, Macrowave is initially invulnerable to the Awesomebots' fire until they shoot him from the other side and promptly destroy him.

=== Humans ===
- Jimmy Junior Hawking: a high school student who befriends the Awesomebots, with a particular fondness for Balls. Jimmy Junior helps the Awesomebots learn more about Earth culture and attempts to get involved in their adventures, to a mixed reception. Accompanying them to the battle at the dam he briefly encounters popular fellow student Mary, who admires his bravery. However, as Jimmy Junior notes "who needs girls when you get to hang out with robots?". He is left behind when the Change-Bots leave Earth but is reunited with them upon their return, to their qualified delight. He now has a moustache, no memory of his father's death, hacking skills and a signed picture of what he claims is a female companion. However, he also uses Laptoror to download robot pornography.
- James "Monkeywrench" Hawking: father of Jimmy Junior, Monkeywrench befriends the Awesomebots along with his son. His mechanical skills help restore Arsonal to life on one occasion, but he is seemingly killed by Papercut in a battle in the South American jungle. Big Rig treats the incident with his trademark sensitivity. Monkeywrench nevertheless reappears when the Change-Bots return to Earth, alive and with no memory of his death. After a brief discussion the Awesombots assume this is something to do with time-travel and promptly accept his survival.
- General Deeyer: one of two generals called Deeyer in the army. Deeyer is captured when investigating the Fantasticave and enters into an alliance with the Fantasticons, under a varying degree of duress. He eventually gets away when the Awesomebots blow up his car, losing him an eye. After Shootertron resurfaces three years later, Deeyer - now with an eyepatch - attempts to harness the Fantasticon's power, and they reform their alliance in an attempt to attack the Change-Bots on their return. While the army's advanced mirror technology makes the Awesomebots' lasers ineffective Deeyer and his men are forced to retreat when the robots just start hitting them. His name is a pun on the phrase "general idea".
- Dr. Infallible: either a scientist or someone with access to a labcoat, Infallible allies with the Fantasticons after they stop working with Deeyer. He creates the "ultimate weapon" Papercut, which only kills Monkeywrench. He is later working for the army after the amnesiac Shootertron is found.
- Stan Dard and Edna Dard: a kindly pair of farmers who adopt the amnesiac Shootertron as their son. While they become more wary of the giant alien robot they take in when they realise he can fire the giant gun on his arm they still do their best to look after him. The couple, and their subsequent adoption of Shootertron, are a parody of Jonathan and Martha Kent from DC Comics' Superman mythos. Brown based Stan's name is a play on the word "standard".

== Cultural impact ==
Various projects have been inspired the novels. After discussing the idea of a theme tune for Incredible Change-Bots with Brown in an interview for his blog, Pirooz Kalayeh wrote music to the lyrics. With Brown's blessing, animator Oren Mashkovski created a "trailer" for the comics, which was uploaded to the official Top Shelf Productions YouTube Channel. Brown claimed that there had been some interest from TV and film studios over a full adaptation but that it had come to nothing.

=== Fan club ===
Brown set up an official fan club for Incredible Change-Bots. The first iteration, advertised in the back of the graphic novel, cost $20, for which members would receive a mini-comic, a full-colour drawing and a membership card. It had around a hundred members. The second version charged $5 in exchange for a newsletter, a black-and-white sketch of a requested Change-Bot and a membership card. Animator Pendleton Ward was named as the organisation's vice-president, a post that - in Brown's words - had "zero actual responsibilities".

=== Merchandise ===
In 2008 Devil's Due Publishing reached a deal to produce 6-inch vinyl figures based on Incredible Change-Bots characters, beginning with Balls and Microwave (with Soupy and Popper). Each could Incredible Change via substituting parts, included a 6-page exclusive comic strip and had packaging designed by & Thank You For Flying. However, despite prototypes being made and the products being solicited in the Diamond Previews Catalogue the release fell through. The mini-comics were eventually published in Incredible Change-Bots Two Point Something Something.

In 2016 Brown revisited the Change-Bots with a trading card set featuring all-new art, aiming to raise funds through crowdfunding website Kickstarter

=== Other appearances ===
Due to the association with Devil's Due the characters of Balls and Microwave briefly appeared in Hack/Slash #18 in a character's nightmare, and a poster for the first graphic novel is glimpsed in the film version of Kick-Ass.

== Reception ==
All three volumes have received largely positive reviews.

Doug Glassman gave the first book a positive review for Collected Editions, but noted the humour might be lost on those not familiar with the conventions of the Transformers cartoon. Writing for ComicBookBin, Leroy Douressaux gave the graphic novel a B rating but noted similar reservations about the niche humour. Reviewing the book for Panel Patter, Rob McMonigal noted "Good parodies can survive on their own as a story. Incredible Change-Bots does this perfectly." Writing for the MTV Adapt This! column in 2010, Rick Marshall suggested Incredible Change-Bots would make a good animated TV series, noting the books' "perfect balance between nostalgia and self-aware fun", but noted such an adaptation could attract legal attention due to the inspiration it took from the Transformers and GoBots franchises.

James Hunt of Comic Book Resources praised Incredible Change-Bots Two, noting that it "builds on the original without being a complete retread", while Michael May positively compared it to the Transformers film series, a sentiment that was shared by McMonigal in Panel Patter's review. Sean Edgar scored the book at 8.2 out of 10 for Paste, noting "Brown's art resembles the margins of a ridiculously talented high-schooler's geometry notebook, but this informal, goofy take perfectly complements a story that revels in incompetent characters and sly non sequiturs." Jonathan H. Liu was equally positive for Wired, noting the story "takes a lot of the tropes of our beloved Saturday morning cartoons and mashes them up into a hilarious take on giant (and not-so-giant) robots battling it out for no really good reason." On his personal blog, The Comics Journal critic Rob Clough noted that the book had "either a comedic bit, a fight or an explosion on every page.", while R. Fiore noted that "No fair observer would deny that it takes more than one book to fully explore the absurdity of the Transformers concept."

Reviewing Incredible Change-Bots Two Point Something Something for ComicBookBin, Douressaux praised the book, noting it "is not a collection of throw-away stuff and odds-and-ends. These are fully functional short stories and vignettes..."
