= Craig Thompson =

American graphic novelist (born 1975)

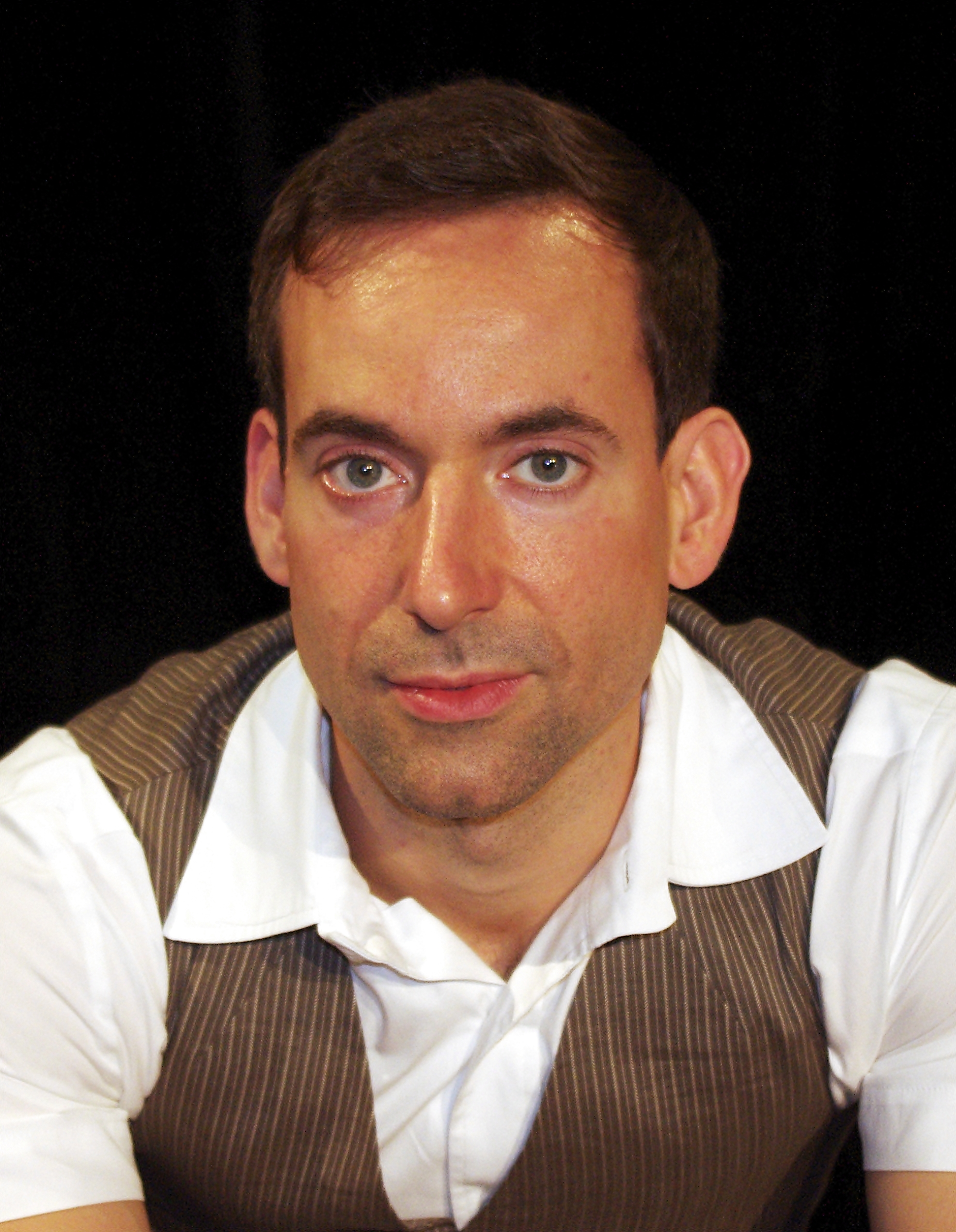
- Thompson at the 2011 Brooklyn Book Festival
- Born: September 21, 1975 (age 51) Traverse City, Michigan, US
- Areas: Writer, Penciller, Inker
- Notable works: Good-bye, Chunky Rice; Blankets; Carnet de Voyage; Habibi

Craig Matthew Thompson (born September 21, 1975) is an American graphic novelist best known for his books Good-bye, Chunky Rice (1999), Blankets (2003), Carnet de Voyage (2004), Habibi (2011), Space Dumplins (2015), and Ginseng Roots (2025). Thompson has received four Harvey Awards, three Eisner Awards, and two Ignatz Awards. In 2007, his cover design for the Menomena album Friend and Foe received a Grammy nomination for Best Recording Package.

== Early life ==
Craig Thompson was born in Traverse City, Michigan in 1975. He, his younger brother "Phil" and his sister grew up in rural Marathon, Wisconsin, in a fundamentalist Christian family. His father was a plumber, and his mother alternated between working as a stay-at-home mom and a visiting-nurse assistant for the disabled. Media such as films and television shows were screened or altogether censored by their parents, and the only music allowed was Christian music. Thompson's only access to the arts were the Sunday funnies and comics, since they were assumed to be for children, to which Thompson attributes his early affinity for the medium. Thompson and his brother were particularly enamored of black and white independent comics in the 1980s, such as the Teenage Mutant Ninja Turtles, and the do-it-yourself ethic that they embodied.

In high school Thompson entertained dreams of becoming either a small-town artist or a film animator. He attended the University of Wisconsin–Marathon County for three semesters, during which he began writing a comic strip for the college newspaper and "just kind of fell in love with [comics], suddenly. It filled all my needs -- I was able to draw cartoons, to tell a story; but I also had total control, and I wasn't just a cog in some machine somewhere." After spending a semester at the Milwaukee Institute of Art & Design, Thompson left his hometown in 1997 and settled in Portland, Oregon.

== Career ==
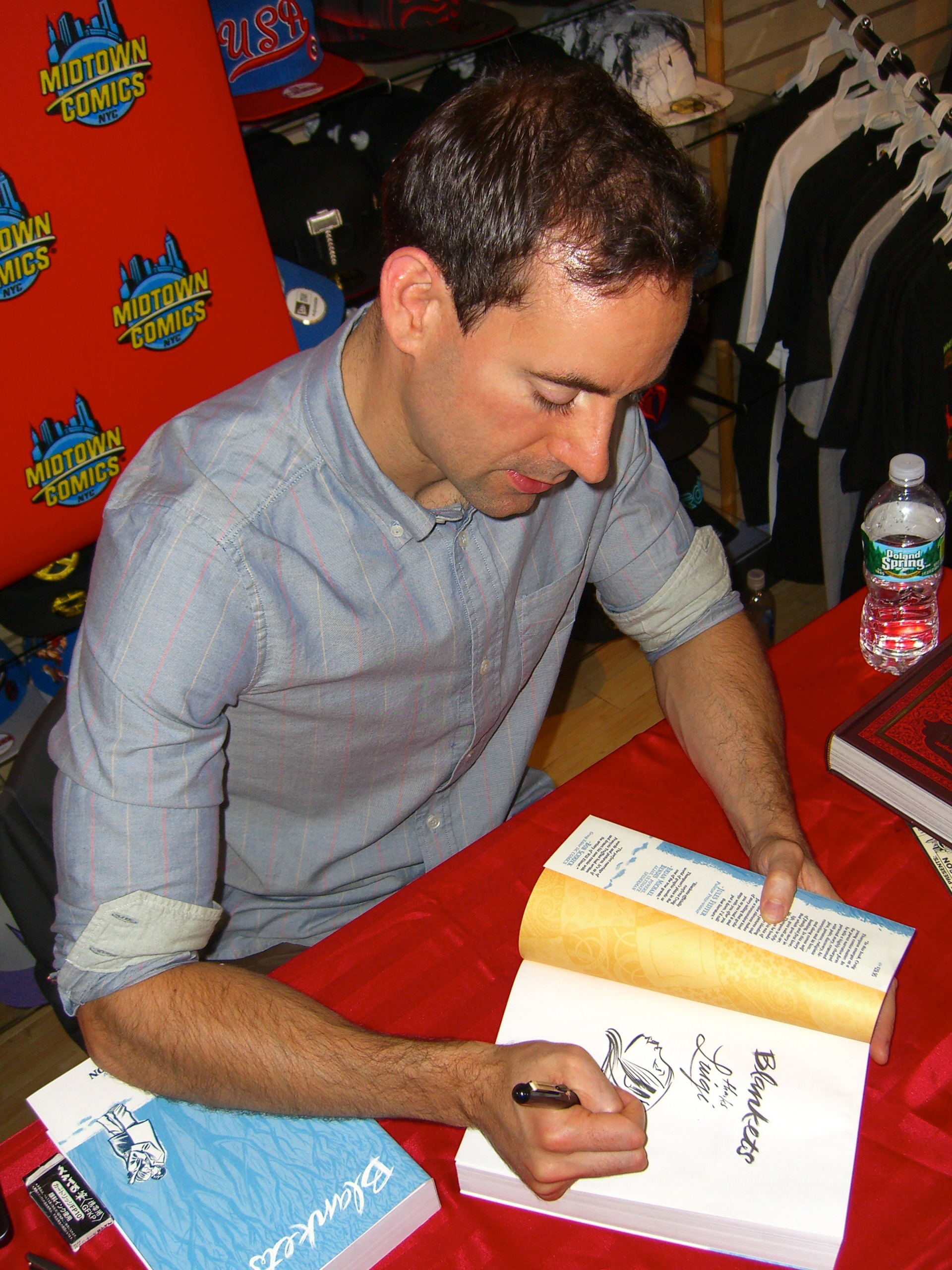
Craig Thompson sketches Raina in a copy of Blankets at a September 20, 2011, book signing at Midtown Comics in Manhattan.

Thompson worked briefly at Dark Horse Comics, drawing ads, logos, and toy packaging for the company while working on personal projects at night. After developing tendinitis, Thompson left Dark Horse and devoted his time to his own work.

His debut graphic novel was the semi-autobiographical Good-bye, Chunky Rice (1999), which was inspired by his move to Portland and "cute cartoony stuff" from his childhood such as the work of Jim Henson, Dr. Seuss, and Tim Burton. As a result of Chunky Rice, Thompson won a 2000 Harvey Award for Best New Talent and received a 2000 Ignatz Award nomination for Outstanding Artist. Thompson followed Chunky Rice with the mini-comics Bible Doodles (2000) and Doot Doot Garden (2001).

In late 1999, Thompson began work on a 600-page autobiographical graphic novel Blankets, which was published three and a half years later in 2003 to critical acclaim. Time magazine named Blankets its #1 graphic novel for 2003, and Thompson won two 2004 Eisner Awards, for Best Graphic Album-New and Best Writer/Artist, three Harvey Awards, for Best Artist, Best Cartoonist, and Best Graphic Album of Original Work, and two Ignatz Awards, for Outstanding Graphic Novel or Collection and Outstanding Artist.

Thompson said that he believes Blankets was a success because he was "reacting against all of the over-the-top, explosive action genre [in alternative comics, and] I also didn't want to do anything cynical and nihilistic, which is the standard for a lot of alternative comics." As a result of Blankets, he rose quickly to the top ranks of American cartoonists in both popularity and critical esteem. Pulitzer Prize-winning comic artist Art Spiegelman sent him a long letter of praise for Blankets, and in mock-jealousy, Eddie Campbell expressed a temptation to break Thompson's fingers. Despite the praise, the book, which was Thompson's way of coming out to his parents about no longer being a Christian, resulted in tension between him and his parents for a couple of years after they read it.

Thompson followed Blankets with 2004's travelogue Carnet de Voyage, which received Ignatz Award nominations for Outstanding Graphic Novel and Outstanding Artist. He also contributed numerous short works to Nickelodeon Magazine, as "Craigory Thompson".

In 2007, Thompson created the artwork for the Menomena album Friend and Foe, which was released on January 23 from Barsuk Records. Thompson's design received a Grammy nomination for Best Recording Package, to which he responded, "I wanna get it! I think it would be very funny to be a cartoonist with a Grammy ... if nothing else it helps bring attention to the band."

In late 2004, Thompson began working on Habibi, a graphic novel published by Pantheon Books, in September 2011. The book is influenced by Arabic calligraphy and Islamic mythology: "I'm playing with Islam in the same way I was playing with Christianity in Blankets", as he said in a 2005 interview. The book was praised by Time magazine, Elle magazine, Financial Times, Salon, The Independent, NPR, The Millions, Graphic Novel Reporter, and The Harvard Crimson. Other reviewers, such as Michael Faber of The Guardian, and a six-person roundtable discussion of the book conducted by Charles Hatfield of The Comics Journal, while lauding the quality of Thompson's visuals and his use of various Eastern motifs, narrative parallels and intertwining plots and subplots, had negative reactions to the book's length, or the degree of sexual cruelty inflicted upon the main characters.

From 2019 to 2024 Craig Thompson worked on a serialized comic, Ginseng Roots. The series is a "recherche du temps perdu" that tells the story of ginseng in parallel with Craig's childhood, among Christian fundamentalist parents, hard work to grow ginseng, and comics. The 12th and last comic book of the series was published by Uncivilized Books in February 2024. The series was published as a book by Penguin Random House in April 2025. Ginseng farmer Will Hsu likened waiting for the comic book installments to what it's like to grow ginseng: "It teaches you the patience of ginseng,” Hsu explained. “You know, you read a comic book and now you’ve got to wait months for the next installment. Well, you plant ginseng seeds, you’ve got to wait years until you harvest something.”

== Style and influences ==
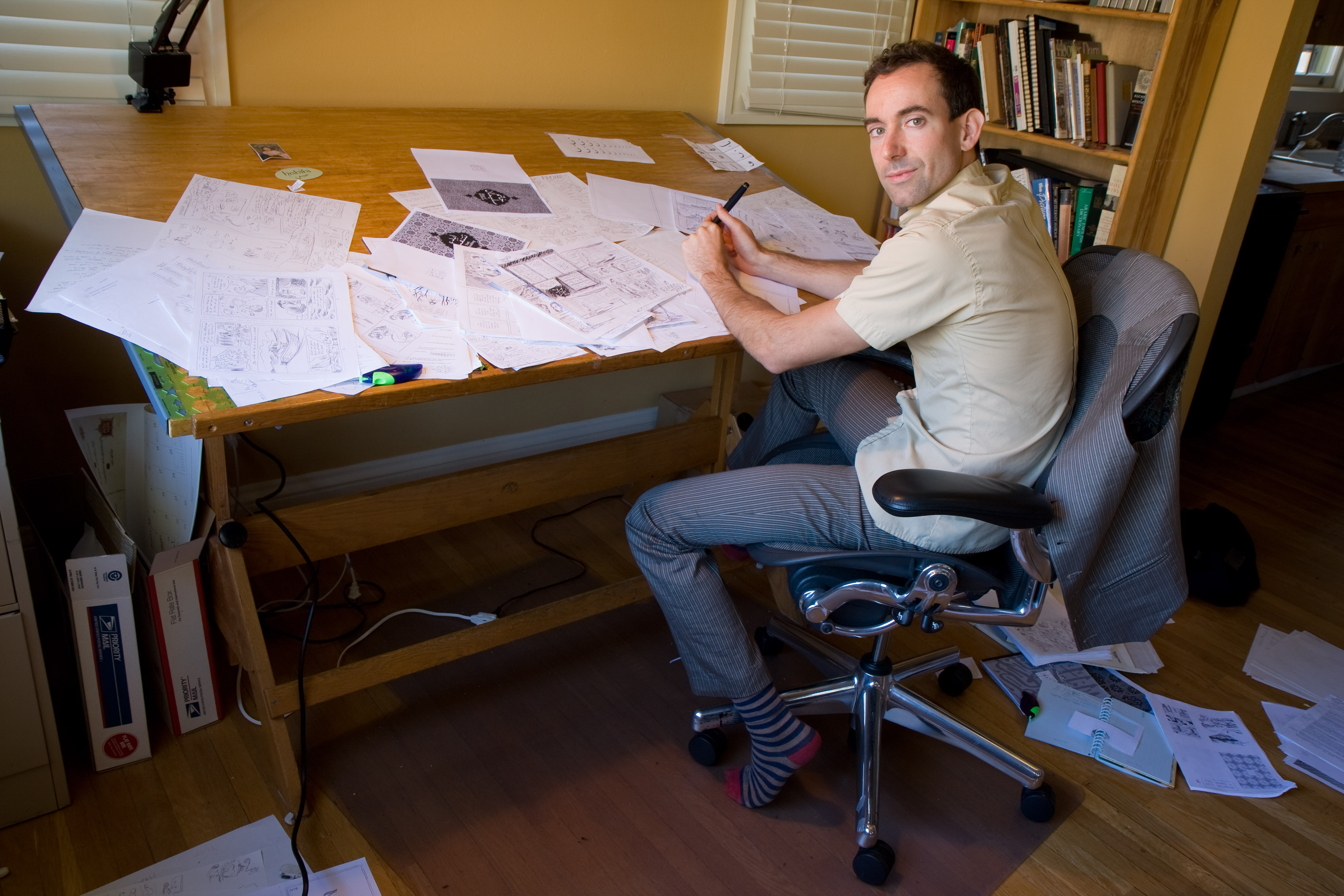
Thompson at his drawing table in 2009

Thompson has acknowledged the influence of graphic artists Taro Yashima, Daniel Clowes, Chris Ware, and Joe Sacco. Thompson has said that, in his composition process, pages are initially composed "in a very illegible form, a shorthand where words and pictures blur into alien scribbles ... I'm working with words and pictures right from the beginning, but the picture might not look any different from a letter, because they're just a bunch of scribbles on a page." Then he rewrites those sketches into "a detailed thumbnail with clear handwriting, and that way I can go back and edit." Even on his long works, Thompson drafts the entire book in ballpoint pen before beginning the final brush-inked version.

== Personal life ==
Thompson has explained that he is no longer a Christian, a status that evolved gradually beginning with his high school years, during which he became disenchanted with the church and its dogma. However, he still agrees with Jesus' teachings.

== Awards ==
- 2000 Harvey Award for Best New Talent for Good-bye, Chunky Rice
- 2004 Eisner Award for Best Graphic Album for Blankets
- 2004 Eisner Award for Best Writer/Artist for Blankets
- 2004 Harvey Award for Best Artist for Blankets
- 2004 Harvey Award for Best Cartoonist for Blankets
- 2004 Harvey Award for Best Graphic Album of Original Work for Blankets
- 2004 Ignatz Award for Outstanding Artist for Blankets
- 2004 Ignatz Award for Outstanding Graphic Novel or Collection for Blankets
- 2005 Prix de la critique for the French edition of Blankets
- 2012 Eisner Award for Best Writer/Artist for Habibi
- 2016 Rudolph-Dirks-Award for Best SciFi / Alternate History for Space Dumplins

=== Nominations ===
- 1999 Harvey Award for Best New Talent for Top Shelf, Doot Doot Garden, et al.
- 2000 Ignatz Award for Outstanding Artist for Good-bye, Chunky Rice
- 2000 Ignatz Award for Outstanding Artist for Carnet de Voyage
- 2000 Ignatz Award for Outstanding Graphic Novel for Carnet de Voyage
- 2007 Grammy Award for Best Recording Package for Friend and Foe
- 2021 Eisner Award Nomination for Best Graphic Memoir for Ginseng Roots
- 2021 Eisner Award Nomination for Best Writer/Artist for Ginseng Roots

== Bibliography ==
=== Graphic novels ===
- Good-bye, Chunky Rice (1999)
- Blankets (2003)
- Carnet de Voyage (2004)
- Habibi (2011)
- Space Dumplins (2015)
- Ginseng Roots (2025)

=== Mini-comics ===
- Bible Doodles (2000)
- Doot Doot Garden (2001)

=== Series ===
- Ginseng Roots (2019–2024): The series is a "recherche du temps perdu" that tells the story of ginseng in parallel with Craig's childhood in Marathon, Wisconsin, one of the world's main exporters of ginseng. The series was collected as a single graphic novel with an extended final chapter and released on April 29, 2025.
