= Asker Abiyev =

Azerbaijani mathematician and physicist

Dr. Asker Ali Abiyev
- Əbiyev Əsgər Əli Qulam oğlu
- Born: June 28, 1934 (age 92); Baku, Azerbaijan SSR, Soviet Union (now Baku, Azerbaijan)
- Citizenship: Azerbaijan
- Education: Doctor of Physical-Mathematical Sciences; Baku State University (1954-1957); Moscow State University (1957-1961); Kurchatov Institute (1963-1966)
- Known for: The discovery of algorithms of Magic square and Magic cube
- Scientific career
- Fields: Physics; Mathematics
- Institutions: Institute of Physics of Azerbaijan National Academy of Sciences (1961-1963 & 1966-1969); Laboratory of the Radiation and semiconductors in Azerbaijan National Academy of Sciences (1966-1993); Yavuz Sultan Private Science Lyceum (1993-2000); Department of Mathematics at Gaziantep University, Turkey (2000-2007); Institute of Radiation Problems, Ministry of Science And Education of the Republic of Azerbaijan (formerly Azerbaijan National Academy of Sciences) (2011-present)
- Thesis: Identification of new technical application fields of the aforementioned semiconductors.
- Website: www.askeraliabiyev.com

Asker Ali Abiyev (Azerbaijani: Əbiyev Əsgər Əli Qulam oğlu), the inventor of Abiyev's Magic squares and Cubes, was born on June 28, 1934 in Baku, Azerbaijan.

== Academic life ==
Abiyev studied in Physics-Mathematics faculty in Baku State University from 1954 to 1957, and then, in the faculty of Physics in Moscow State University from 1957 to 1961. After some years of working, he continued his education from 1963 until 1966 as a postgraduate at Kurchatov Institute.

== Scientific career ==
In 1961–1963, Aliyev worked in the Institute of Physics of Azerbaijan National Academy of Sciences. After his post-graduation from the Kurchatov Institute, he returned to the National Academy in 1966.

After 1969, he worked as a researcher in the Radiation Problems Sector of National Academy, and then, from 1976 until 1993, he worked as the head of the Laboratory of "Radiation Physics of Semiconductors".

He went to Ankara, Turkey, as a professor of Yavuz Sultan Private Science Lyceum in 1993 (until 2000). From 2000 to 2007, he was a professor in the Department of Mathematics at Gaziantep University in Gaziantep, Turkey.

=== Achievements ===
In 1970 and 1988, Abiyev defended dissertations in the field of "Physics of Semiconductors" he obtained his Candidate of Physical-Mathematical Sciences title, and in the field of Dielectrics, he got the Doctor of Physical-Mathematical Sciences title. Later, in 1990, he obtained the title of Professor of Physical-Mathematical Sciences.

== See also ==
- Magic square
- Magic cube
