= Rabbit Fever (film) =

- Official One-Sheet
- Directed by: Amy Do
- Written by: Amy Do
- Produced by: Amy Do; Daniel D. Gregoire
- Starring: Jenna Anderson; Jessica Sheetz; Paula Courtney; Johnny Haussener; Jeremy Garrett; Joe Kim
- Edited by: Dave Ciaccio; Duane Trow; Amy Do
- Music by: Eric Holland
- Release date: 2010
- Running time: 85 minutes
- Country: United States
- Language: English

Rabbit Fever is a 2010 feature-length documentary film directed by Amy Do, about the competition at the 2005 National Convention of the American Rabbit Breeders' Association (ARBA), the largest assemblage of rabbits in the world.

The film has found support from, among others, the Ignatz Award-winning artist Jeffrey Brown, who illustrated the movie poster. It was shown at the 8th San Francisco Documentary Film Festival in October 2009 as a work-in-progress. The final work officially premiered in 2010.

== Production notes ==
Rabbit Fever was originally developed as a 20-minute project for Do's film class at the University of Southern California. Do was encouraged by her instructor, director Charles Braverman to expand it into a feature-length film.

After much demand from her fans in the Rabbit Show community, Amy Do has made a Limited Release of her film which was and currently can be purchased on her website. It was released and shipped to the fans on September 12, 2012, nearly 9 years since the convention it was filmed at had occurred and nearly 3 years since the film was produced and aired for the first time.

== Appearances ==
Teens at the Rabbit Convention take part in the human pageant for the titles of "Rabbit Queen" and "Rabbit King". Rabbit Fever follows some of these contestants:

- Jenna Anderson from Nacogdoches, Texas. At 15, Jenna won the 2003 National Rabbit Queen title. Two years later - as documented in the film - she attempts to win the crown again before she heads off to college.
- Jessica Sheetz from Livermore, California.
- Paula Courtney from Mukwonago, Wisconsin.
- Johnny Haussener from Lock Haven, Pennsylvania.
- Jeremy Garrett from Lansing, Michigan.

Others featured in the documentary include:

- Joe Kim - breeder of Tan rabbits and competitor for Best in Show at the 2003 Convention.
- Glen Carr - former Executive Director of ARBA.
- Cindy Wickizer - former President of ARBA.
- Betty Chu - Renowned rabbit breeder of the only Angora rabbit that has ever won the Best in Show at an ARBA National Convention.
- Lindsey Lauterbach - 1st Runner-Up National Rabbit Queen at the 2003 Convention.
- Jeremy Collins - two-time National Rabbit King winner.
