= Julian Allen =

British-American illustrator

- Born: 1942; Cambridge, England
- Died: 1998 (aged 55–56); Baltimore, Maryland, U.S.
- Known for: Illustrator
- Website: www.julianallen.com

Julian Allen (1942–1998) was a British-American illustrator. He covered various "secret history" stories, including the Watergate scandal and the Yom Kippur War. His illustrations appeared in numerous publications, including Queen, NOVA, Esquire, The Observer, Sports Illustrated, The New Yorker, Time, and The New York Times.

== Biography ==
Born in Cambridge, England in 1942, Allen studied at the Central School of Art and Design in London.

In 1973, Allen moved to the United States on the invitations of Clay Felker and Milton Glaser. Glaser later said that they had found Allen while trying to "find an illustrator whose journalistic interest and talent would permit us to do unusual visual reportage". Allen taught at the Parson's School of Design for more than 20 years. In 1997, Allen became the Illustration Chair of the Maryland Institute College of Art, where he integrated professionalism into the artistry curriculum.

Allen died in September 1998 of non-Hodgkin's lymphoma.
