= Niklas Asker =

Swedish comic book artist

Niklas Asker (born 1979) is a Swedish comic book artist, best known for his debut graphic novel Second Thoughts.
