= Blankets (comics) =

2003 graphic novel

- Cover art by Craig Thompson.

Publication information
- Publisher: Top Shelf Productions
- Genre: Autobiography; Romance; Drama
- Publication date: July 23, 2003

Creative team
- Written by: Craig Thompson
- Artist: Craig Thompson

Collected editions
- Paperback: ISBN 1-891830-43-0

Blankets is an autobiographical graphic novel by Craig Thompson, published in 2003 by Top Shelf Productions. As a coming-of-age autobiography, the book tells the story of Thompson's childhood in an Evangelical Christian family, his first love, and his early adulthood. The book was widely acclaimed, with Time magazine ranking it #1 in its 2003 Best Comics list, and #8 in its Best Comics of the Decade.

== Publication history ==
In late 1999, Thompson began work on the graphic novel, which was published three and a half years later in 2003. Thompson produced the book as a way of coming out to his parents about no longer being a Christian.

== Main characters ==
- Craig Thompson: Craig is the main character, who is depicted from childhood to young adulthood. Craig is a talented artist and devout Christian. At a Baptist Christian winter camp he meets a girl from a similar background named Raina who becomes his first love.
- Phil: Craig's younger brother. Like Craig, he likes to draw, and the first portion of the story details their childhood together, though they later drift apart. Their adventures are also recalled at least once in each chapter throughout the book.
- Raina: Craig's first love, a fellow Christian whom Craig first meets at a church camp. Like Craig, her family is not well-off financially, and her parents' divorce causes her stress. She also takes care of her mentally disabled sister and brother. Although she believes in God, she does not believe as strongly as Craig does.
- Craig's parents: Craig's parents are strict, devoutly religious Christians who are not very tolerant of liberal Christianity.
- Raina's father: Raina's father is a man who is loyal to his own beliefs and is hoping to salvage his relationship with his wife.
- Raina's mother: Raina's mother has no interest in repairing her relationship with her husband, and is trying to move on. Both she and her husband leave Raina to take care of her adopted siblings, as well as her niece. After being away from the home all day and upon returning, she frequented the medicine cabinet for some prescription drugs to retreat to her bedroom alone.
- Laura and Ben: Raina's adopted sister and brother, both of whom are mentally disabled. Ben is a far more quiet and collected person, whereas Laura is far more energetic. It's implied that Ben has Down syndrome; Laura's disability is not specified, but she functions at the level of a very young child.
- Julie and Dave: Raina's sister and brother-in-law.

== Synopsis ==
Childhood scene in Blankets in which Craig and Phil find a pair of animal skulls

Blankets chronicles Craig's adolescence and young adulthood, his childhood relationship with his younger brother, and the conflicts he experiences regarding Christianity and his first love. Though written chronologically, Thompson uses flashbacks as a literary and artistic device in order to parallel young adult experience with past childhood experience. Major literary themes of the work include: first love, child and adult sexuality, spirituality, sibling relationships, and coming of age.

Craig begins by describing his relationship with his brother during their childhood in Wisconsin. They have devoutly religious parents. Thompson also depicts a male babysitter sexually abusing both Craig and his younger brother, Phil. Craig suffers harassment from bullies at school and at church.

Through his teen years, he continues to find it hard to fit in with his peers, but at Bible camp one winter, he comes to associate with a group of outcast teens which includes a girl named Raina, who develops an interest in Craig. The two become inseparable, and continue their relationship through letters and phone calls. They arrange to spend two weeks together at Raina's home in Michigan's Upper Peninsula.

Craig arrives and meets Raina's family, which includes her two adopted siblings, Ben and Laura, her older biological sister Julie, and her parents, who are undergoing a divorce. Raina feels responsible for taking care of Ben and Laura, who are mentally disabled, as well as Julie's newborn daughter. Despite growing closer during the visit, the two return to their separate lives, but Raina eventually decides to break off the relationship. They maintain a friendship for a time, talking on the phone with diminishing frequency (and increasing inanity). Ultimately, Craig tells Raina that their friendship, too, is over. Craig then destroys everything Raina had ever given to him, and every memento of their relationship, except for the quilt she made. He stores it in the attic of his childhood home, and moves out to start his own life elsewhere. Craig comes to terms with religion and his spiritual identity while away from his family, and confides in his brother that he is no longer a Christian, but still believes in God and the teachings of Jesus. He returns to his childhood home after several years, seemingly a different person.

== Reception ==
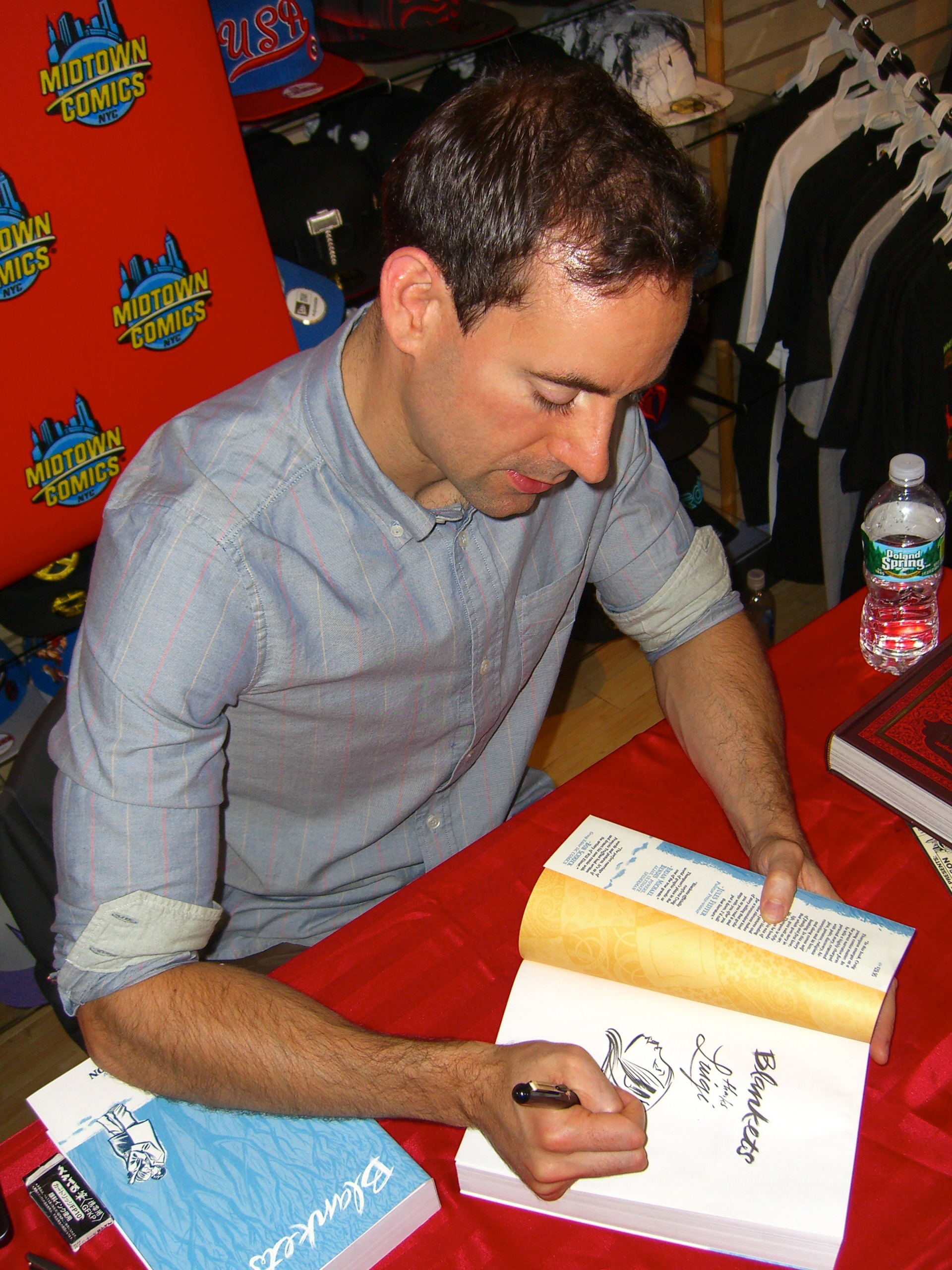
Craig Thompson sketches Raina in a copy of the book at a September 20, 2011, book signing at Midtown Comics in Manhattan.

The Bloomsbury Review called Blankets "a superb example of the art of cartooning: the blending of word and picture to achieve an effect that neither is capable of without the other." Time stated that Thompson's work "has set new bars for the medium not just in length, but breadth" and listed it as #1 in its 2003 Best Comics of the Year list, and ranked it as #8 in its 10 Best Comics of the Decade. The book was called a "magnum opus" in the inaugural issue of (Cult)ure Magazine. Publishers Weekly wrote that "Thompson manages to explore adolescent social yearnings, the power of young love and the complexities of sexual attraction with a rare combination of sincerity, pictorial lyricism and taste".

As a result of Blankets, Thompson rose quickly to the top ranks of American cartoonists in both popularity and critical esteem. Pulitzer Prize-winning comic artist Art Spiegelman sent him a long letter of praise for the work, and in mock-jealousy, Eddie Campbell expressed a temptation to break Thompson's fingers. Another Pulitzer Prize-winning comic author, Jules Feiffer, wrote that Thompson's "expert blending of words and pictures and resonant silences makes for a transcendent kind of story-telling that grabs you as you read it and stays with you after you put it down". Alan Moore praised the book in interviews as "an incredibly heartwarming human document" adding that he found it "touching and engrossing", and publicly defended it when it was attacked as pornography (see below). Neil Gaiman wrote, "I thought it was moving, tender, beautifully drawn, painfully honest, and probably the most important graphic novel since Jimmy Corrigan".

Thompson said that he believes Blankets was a success because he was "reacting against all of the over-the-top, explosive action genre [in alternative comics, and] I also didn't want to do anything cynical and nihilistic, which is the standard for a lot of alternative comics." Despite the praise heaped upon the book, it resulted in tension between Thompson and his parents for a couple of years after they read it.

In October 2006, a resident of Marshall, Missouri, attempted to have Blankets and Fun Home by Alison Bechdel removed from the city's public library. Supporters of the books' removal characterized them as "pornography" and expressed concern that they would be read by children. Marshall Public Library Director Amy Crump defended the books as having been well-reviewed in "reputable, professional book review journals," and characterized the removal attempt as a step towards "the slippery slope of censorship". On October 11, 2006, the library's board appointed a committee to create a materials selection policy, and removed Blankets and Fun Home from circulation until the new policy was approved. The committee "decided not to assign a prejudicial label or segregate [the books] by a prejudicial system", and presented a materials selection policy to the board. On March 14, 2007, the Marshall Public Library Board of Trustees voted to return both Blankets and Fun Home to the library's shelves. In 2021, book ban requests started to grow quickly in The United States, Blankets has been repeatedly targeted for banning and removal from schools and libraries.

In 2024, Blankets was one of 13 books banned from all Utah public schools by the state school board for allegedly containing "objective sensitive material." In 2025, the Canadian province of Alberta included Blankets as an example of the type of book that schools libraries should remove from circulation.

With the demand for a sequel to Blankets, Craig released Ginseng Roots in 2025 which continues his childhood autobiography. In this follow up story we get introduced to his sister who wasn't mentioned in Blankets.

=== Awards ===
- 2004 Harvey Award for Best Artist
- 2004 Harvey Award for Best Cartoonist
- 2004 Harvey Award for Best Graphic Album of Original Work
- 2004 Eisner Award for Best Graphic Album
- 2004 Eisner Award for Best Writer/Artist
- 2004 Ignatz Award for Outstanding Artist
- 2004 Ignatz Award for Outstanding Graphic Novel or Collection
- 2005 Prix de la critique

== Editions ==
Covers of the French, Spanish and Italian editions of Blankets (from left to right)

Editions are available in English, French, Spanish, German, Danish, Dutch, Italian, Czech, Polish, Hungarian, Slovenian, Estonian, Greek, Serbian, Norwegian, Catalan, Hebrew and Portuguese. Additionally, the English, Serbian and Dutch versions were available in a limited-edition hardcover volume and Polish was available with special cover jacket for those who pre-ordered the book. There is also an accompanying soundtrack, recorded by the Portland, Oregon-based band Tracker. The French, Spanish, and Italian editions all have different cover art. The first Italian edition has a red spine, while subsequent editions have a blue one.

- Blankets (English paperback edition) ISBN 1-891830-43-0, Top Shelf Productions
- Blankets – Manteau de Neige (French edition) ISBN 2-203-39608-3, Casterman, March 2004
- Blankets (Spanish edition) ISBN 84-95825-63-5, Astiberri Ediciones, April 2004
- Blankets (Catalan edition) ISBN 84-95825-67-8 Astiberri Ediciones, April 2004
- Blankets (German edition) ISBN 3-936068-96-8, Speed Comics, May 2004
- Een deken van sneeuw (Dutch edition) ISBN 90-5492-119-6, Oog & Blik, May 2004
- Blankets (Italian edition) ISBN 88-88063-97-8, Coconino Press, November 2004
- Pod dekou (Czech edition) ISBN 80-7341-603-4, BB Art, November 2005
- Blankets. Pod śnieżną kołderką (Polish edition) ISBN 83-922963-7-0, Timof i Cisi Wspólnicy, December 2006
- Blankets (Greek edition) ISBN 960-89453-5-6, Εκδόσεις ΚΨΜ, March 2007
- Tepper (Norwegian edition) ISBN 978-82-429-3051-4 Egmont Serieforlaget AS, 2006
- Retalhos (Brazilian edition) ISBN 978-85-359-1448-1 Cia das Letras, 2009
- Blankets (Portuguese edition) ISBN 978-989-559-199-2 Biblioteca da Alice, 2011
- En dyne af sne (Danish edition) ISBN 978-87-90370-65-7 Forlaget Fahrenheit, 2008
- 담요 (Korean edition) ISBN 9788990641878, 박여영 번역, 미메시스, 2012
- Blankets. Ispod pokrivača (Serbian edition) ISBN 978-8687919396, Komiko, 2014
- Blankets – Takarók (Hungarian edition) ISBN 978-9639998551, Vad Virágok Könyvműhely, 2018
- Blankets. Lumeteki all (Estonian edition) ISBN 978-9949-7356-1-7, Pythagorase Püksid, 2021
