= Accused (2023 TV series) =

2023 American crime drama anthology television series

- Genre: Legal drama; Crime drama; Anthology
- Based on: Accused by Jimmy McGovern
- Developed by: Howard Gordon
- Music by: Sean Callery; Tim Callobre
- Country of origin: United States
- Original language: English
- No. of seasons: 2
- No. of episodes: 23

Production
- Executive producers: Michael Cuesta; Jimmy McGovern; Sita Williams; Roxy Spencer; Jacob Cohen-Holmes; Louise Pedersen; David Shore; Erin Gunn; John Weber; Frank Siracusa; Glenn Geller; Alex Gansa; Howard Gordon; Chip Johannessen; Milan Cheylov; Daniel Pearle (season 2)
- Producers: Daniel Pearle (season 1); Nick Iannelli; Matt Code; Suzanne Colvin-Goulding
- Cinematography: Jeremy Benning; Derick V. Underschultz; Alan Poon; Daniel Grant; Christopher Mably; Gerald Packer
- Editors: Kane Platt; Duncan Christie; Dev Singh; Dona Noga; John Nicholls; Maureen Grant
- Running time: 44 minutes
- Production companies: All3Media International; Teakwood Lane Productions; Fox Entertainment; Sony Pictures Television (Note: Credited as Sony Pictures Television Studios in season 1.)

Original release
- Network: Fox
- Release: January 22, 2023 – December 3, 2024

Accused is an American crime drama anthology television series developed by Howard Gordon that is based on the 2010 British series of the same name, created by Jimmy McGovern. The series premiered on Fox on January 22, 2023. In March 2023, the series was renewed for a second season which premiered on October 8, 2024.

== Premise ==
The series chronicles ordinary people, wherein each episode opens in a courtroom introducing the accused without knowing their crime or how they ended up on trial. The audience is then told the events that led them there from the defendant's point of view.

== Episodes ==
=== Series overview ===
Season	Episodes	Originally released	
Season	Episodes	First released	Last released
1	15	January 22, 2023	May 9, 2023
2	8	October 8, 2024	December 3, 2024

=== Season 1 (2023) ===
No. overall	No. in season	Title	Directed by	Written by	Original release date	U.S. viewers (millions)
1	1	"Scott's Story"	Michael Cuesta	Howard Gordon	January 22, 2023	8.71
In suburban Cook County, Illinois, successful neurosurgeon Scott Harmon (Michael Chiklis) is on trial for providing material assistance to a school shooter. Scott's son Devin is suspended for threatening another student, and his father suspects that he is planning to commit an act of mass violence after finding a diary in his room filled with dark thoughts and fantasies of revenge. After a botched attempt to murder his son in a staged accident, Scott gives Devin money so he can travel and try to cope with his anger. Shortly after his return, Scott hears on the news that his son and a young man named Jasper are armed and have taken hostages at their former high school. When Scott tries to talk his son into surrendering, Devin angrily blames his father for giving up on him before committing suicide while Jasper is taken into custody. After hearing his story, the judge dismisses the charges against Scott. Cast: Michael Chiklis, Jill Hennessy, Robert Wisdom, Evan Marsh, and Oakes Fegley
2	2	"Ava's Story"	Marlee Matlin	Maile Meloy	January 24, 2023	2.45
In Cincinnati, deaf surrogate mother Ava (Stephanie Nogueras) is on trial for kidnapping and endangering a minor. Ava gives birth to baby Lucie for parents Jenny (Megan Boone) and Max (Aaron Ashmore), but not long after her birth they learn Lucie may also be deaf. Jenny and Max consider a cochlear implant procedure to allow Lucie to hear, but Ava is vehemently opposed to it. While Jenny and Max argue at their home, Ava takes Lucie and drives towards Michigan, as surrogacy adoption laws are different there. Her boyfriend KJ joins her, but she leaves him at a store while he's in the bathroom. Ava decides to leave Lucie at a police station in Archbold, but she is arrested before she can do so. After replacing her original lawyer with a deaf counsel (Lauren Ridloff), Ava tells her story to the court. Ultimately, Lucie's parents request the state drop the charges, and the prosecutor agrees to do so. Jenny and Max agree to try learning sign language. Cast: Megan Boone, Stephanie Nogueras, Joshua M. Castille, Aaron Ashmore, Daphne Rubin-Vega, and Lauren Ridloff
3	3	"Danny's Story"	Jonathan Mostow	Teleplay by : Daniel Pearle; Based on : The English episode by Jimmy McGovern & Danny Brocklehurst	January 31, 2023	2.46
In Nassau County, New York, teenager Danny is on trial for stabbing his stepmother Alison (Rachel Bilson). Shortly after his mother Isabel dies of an illness, Danny witnesses his father John (Jack Davenport) kissing Alison, Isabel's caretaker. Danny confronts his father, who tells him and his brother that he and Alison are in a relationship. Shortly after the family dog is struck and killed by a car, and Danny accuses Alison of killing it and his mother. Not long after that Danny is hospitalized after eating Alison's food, but no problems are found. John tells Danny his uncle had schizophrenia and he may have it as well. Danny collects oatmeal Alison made for him and tries to convince classmate Leanna to take it for chemical analysis, but she leaves after asking if he's seen a therapist. That evening Danny grabs a knife and goes to Alison's room to gather evidence, but when confronted by her he stabs Alison before being arrested. Although initially refusing, Danny agrees to take a psychiatric evaluation and is sent to a mental facility. Six months later, Alison arrives and tells Danny his father died of a heart attack during their honeymoon, and that his brother has stomach pains. Cast: Rachel Bilson, Reid Miller, August Maturo, and Jack Davenport
4	4	"Kendall's Story"	Clark Johnson	Teleplay by : Keith Josef Adkins	February 14, 2023	2.24
In Cincinnati, Kendall Gomillion (Malcolm-Jamal Warner) is on trial for murder. After his daughter Ingrid is sexually assaulted at a park, Kendall wants to work with Detective Trent Douglas (Wendell Pierce), but his friend and coworker Lamar Mingoe encourages him to find the perpetrator himself. He informs Gomillion that Douglas looked away during the police killing of a black teenager. Lamar later tells Kendall he found the perpetrator at a park, so he and their coworker David Perry search for him while Kendall misses Ingrid's catechism. They find and beat the man, Clyde Ellman, with Lamar ultimately killing him. Douglas visits Kendall and accuses him of involvement, but he claims he was at work with Lamar and David. Kendall eventually tells his wife Alisa (Karen LeBlanc) the truth, and she convinces him to tell Douglas his side of the story. But at the station, he learns his friends have pinned the blame solely on him. On trial, Kendall yells at Lamar while he testifies, calling him a liar. As bailiffs drag him away, Douglas tells Kendall he believes his story and that he will seek justice for him. Cast: Malcolm-Jamal Warner, Karen LeBlanc, Donald Paul, Kobna Holdbrook-Smith, and Wendell Pierce
5	5	"Robyn's Story"	Billy Porter	Teleplay by : Daniel Pearle	February 21, 2023	2.00
In Quincy, Massachusetts, drag queen Kevin Milstead/Robyn Blind (J. Harrison Ghee) is on trial for murder. After being catcalled while leaving a drag show, Robyn accepts a ride from the catcaller's brother Jamie Walsh, and they begin a relationship, but it ends after the second meeting where Jamie says his wife is dead. A month later they reconnect at Robyn's show, but later Robyn notices Jamie with a woman (Kristen Connolly). He goes to her store where he learns she is Jamie's wife Natalie and that Jamie was sexually abused by a man as a child. The conversation leads Natalie to suggest counseling to Jamie. Jamie realizes Robyn spoke to Natalie and confronts him, the two meeting at a park, where Natalie is watching. Later that day Jamie calls Robyn and says he and Natalie have split up and asks to leave with him. Robyn agrees, but at a river Jamie confesses he accidentally killed Natalie after an argument and that they need to hide the body. Robyn flees and encounters a passing motorist. At his trial, the case is leaning against Robyn until he returns in drag and explains how difficult it would to be to dispose of a body in that outfit. Robyn is acquitted of all charges. Cast: J. Harrison Ghee, Chris Coy, Kristen Connolly, Willam Belli, and Eva Reign
6	6	"Naataanii's Story"	Tazbah Chavez	Teleplay by : Tazbah Chavez and Chip Johannessen; Story by : Chip Johannessen	February 28, 2023	1.58
Navajo Nation activist Naataanii Desmond and his friends Shandiin and Chase are on trial for murder. After being arrested while protesting a uranium mine, their friend Derrick (Kiowa Gordon) devises a plan to sabotage mining operations. He and Shandiin steal a keycard from a mine guard at a bar, but Derrick stays behind to speak to a man (Dash Mihok). The group breaks into the processing plant, but when Shandiin sees the man from the bar and FBI agents entering, the group attempts to escape. Derrick takes a guard hostage at gunpoint, but the group confronts him for being an informant. Following a standoff the group is arrested and the gun is dropped, but the lead agent shoots Derrick and plants the gun on him. During the trial the guard testifies that Derrick had the gun, and Chase confronts a Native American bailiff for covering his pro-Navajo shirt. The FBI agent tries to convince Naataanii to become an informant, but he refuses, and as he leaves the bailiff reveals to Naataanii she was recording the conversation. The activists are released, the DOJ closes the plant, and the FBI agent is charged for his role in the cover-up. Cast: Kiowa Gordon, Natalie Benally, Forrest Goodluck, Robert I. Mesa, Deanna Allison, and Dash Mihok
7	7	"Brenda's Story"	Julie Hébert	Sonay Hoffman	March 7, 2023	2.08
In Brooklyn, stand-up comedian Brenda (Whitney Cummings) is on trial for aggravated mayhem. After attending a stand-up routine Brenda and her best friend Chad (Baron Vaughn) visit a party hosted by their old friend Zeke Thompson, who has made it big as a comedian. After Chad leaves Brenda goes upstairs to show Zeke some material for his tour, but Zeke forcefully rapes her. The day after she has a rape kit taken, which leads to Zeke's arrest the next day. Brenda meets a woman named Tess (Mary Lynn Rajskub) who defends her online and in person, but Chad becomes suspicious after finding cut-outs of Zeke's face in her apartment. After the ADA interviews Zeke, Chad, and others, he drops charges against Zeke after finding it would be hard to convict him, as he had consensual sex with Brenda in the past. Tess, inspired by a comment Brenda left on one of Zeke's posts, confronts him outside a show and sets him on fire. At her trial, Brenda is confronted with the comment she left, but ultimately is found not guilty. Zeke, who survived his injuries, is confronted by a group of Brenda's supporters as he leaves the courtroom, but Brenda tells them to let him go. Cast: Whitney Cummings, Sean Kleier, Mary Lynn Rajskub, Baron Vaughn, and Rhea Perlman
8	8	"Laura's Story"	Lee Rose	Daniel Pearle	March 14, 2023	1.86
In Lake Forest, Illinois, Professor Laura Broder (Molly Parker) is on trial for murder. After her son Liam was killed in a school shooting (depicted in "Scott's Story"), Laura goes on the news to advocate for a gun bill. She learns of conspiracists who believe the shooting was a hoax, led by Joanna Lynn Pierce (Margo Martindale). After the family's address is published, they go to a temporary home. Laura's husband Eric secretly buys a gun. When their other son Jonah is attacked while bicycling, Eric convinces Laura they should move. Laura and Jonah go for a drive but encounter a Joanna-led protest, leading Laura to grab her megaphone and get arrested. After Joanna files a restraining order, Laura argues with Eric over his gun purchase. They find that the gun and Jonah are missing and realize he found Joanna's address on the restraining order. They go to Joanna's house but find that Jonah has broken in and killed her. Laura calls 911 and claims she shot Joanna. At her trial, the defense attorney moves to have Jonah testify, but Laura opts to plead guilty instead, taking a minimum fifteen-year sentence. Cast: Molly Parker, Shawn Doyle, Liam MacDonald, and Margo Martindale
9	9	"Jack's Story"	Michael Chiklis	Hannah Schneider	March 21, 2023	1.85
In Lubbock County, Texas, schoolteacher Jack Fletcher (Jason Ritter) is on trial for statutory rape and transporting a minor across state lines. After discovering his student Clara Palmer attempting to hang herself, Jack intervenes and learns Clara is pregnant by her classmate Richie. Jack takes her to New Mexico to get an abortion, telling his fiancée Britney (Wrenn Schmidt) he's consulting a friend about a divorce. But Britney gets suspicious after finding beads in Jack's glovebox. After Jack learns from Richie that he has never had sex, he questions Clara and learns her stepfather has been sexually abusing her. Jack tells Britney the truth but is arrested before he can finish. Pressured by her stepfather, Clara testifies against Jack and says he was grooming her. Britney believes her until Jack texts her using his attorney's phone convincing her otherwise. Britney speaks to Clara's mother, who realizes the truth and confronts her husband, who is arrested. Clara recants her testimony and charges against Jack except transporting a minor are dropped, which Jack's attorney says will likely only result in probation and the loss of his teaching license in Texas. Cast: Jason Ritter, Wrenn Schmidt, and Emma Nelson
10	10	"Esme's Story"	Michael Offer	Chip Johannessen	March 28, 2023	1.85
In Brooklyn, Esme Barnes (Abigail Breslin) is on trial for murder. While out with her black girlfriend Aaliyah, Esme encounters a white supremacist rally that is interrupted by counterprotesters. A car then drives into the crowd. Esme finds Aaliyah pretending to be a white supremacist online to find the driver of the vehicle. After a white supremacist named Ancel shows up at their apartment, Esme, who is white, poses as a white supremacist and befriends the man. Esme learns his compound is planning something, but police decline to investigate. Esme accepts an invitation to the compound, where she finds the car and a Nazi flag but is discovered and attacked by their leader Shaggy, (Kyle Schmid), who also identifies himself as the driver of the car. Shaggy and Ancel argue over whether to kill Esme, leading to a fight, in which Ancel tells Esme to drive the car home. But when an officer opens the trunk a bomb goes off, killing six. The FBI raids the compound but finds it deserted. Esme leaves and tracks down the two white supremacists before running them down. Following her trial, which is briefly interrupted by militia members, Esme is found guilty. Cast: Abigail Breslin, Aisha Dee, Blaine Kern III, and Kyle Schmid
11	11	"Jiro's Story"	Brad Turner	Karl Taro Greenfeld	April 4, 2023	1.69
In Sacramento, California, soccer coach Jiro Tamura (Ian Anthony Dale) is on trial for assault and negligence. After their mother dies, Jiro sends his brother Osamu to the Wildwood Gardens facility. While at the facility Jiro encounters aggressive resident Kyle "Kip" Tanner, who caretaker Leon says got into an altercation with Osamu. Osamu falls down some stairs, and he tells Jiro that a "bad man" pushed him. Jiro convinces his wife Sarah (Julia Chan) to look into Kip's criminal history, finding he was sent to Wildwood Gardens for an assault. The facility finds a tablet Kip stole from Osamu and has him sent to a different facility. A few days later Jiro is dropping off a bento for Osamu when he notices he has been tied to his bed. He brings Osamu home, shoving Leon unconscious along the way. At his home Jiro and Sarah speak to responding police officers when their daughters tell them Osamu has fallen into the pool, and although he falls unconscious Osamu survives. At his trial Jiro tells the jury he refused all plea deals because it would mean he would be ineligible to be Osamu's caretaker, and the jury votes to acquit. Cast: Ian Anthony Dale, Julia Chan, Takashi Yamaguchi, and Sarah Power
12	12	"Morgan's Story"	Milan Cheylov	Teleplay by : Zakiyyah Alexander	April 11, 2023	1.80
In Manhattan, schoolteacher Morgan Knight (Meaghan Rath) is on trial for drug dealing. Morgan and her husband Jason (Christopher Gorham) have marital issues. After saving a student from choking, Morgan meets her coworker Kashir. Morgan later goes to his apartment and misses a planned train to Boston that crashes midway through. Not long after, Morgan files to divorce Jason and is granted full custody of their son Ari despite Jason's protests. Jason visits his police officer brother Eric and inquires about hiring a hitman, but Eric rejects the idea, leading Jason to plan for Morgan to be arrested. Morgan and Kashir are pulled over and a bag of cocaine is found in Ari's bag. Charges are dropped against Kashir but Morgan faces federal charges of drug dealing. Eric plants a fake witness in the trial, who says he bought drugs from Morgan, but her attorney goads him into saying he can't remember what her car was, despite it being an easily-recognizable yellow Porsche. The judge drops all charges and Eric is arrested. Some time later Morgan and Kashir are at a park with Ari. As he goes into some bushes to grab his frisbee, Ari is suddenly approached by Jason. Cast: Meaghan Rath, Christopher Gorham, James Udom, and David Gautreaux
13	13	"Samir's Story"	Sameh Zoabi	Teleplay by : Arlo Gordon & Daniel Pearle	April 25, 2023	1.61
In Jersey City, New Jersey, limo driver Samir Khalil (Adam Bakri) is on trial for murder. Samir becomes infatuated with one of his passengers, real estate agent Alice Baylor (Julia Goldani Telles), who mistakenly leaves her phone in Samir's car. Samir is studying to become a doctor, but leaves the test and goes to his friend and coworker's home, telling his mom he's celebrating. He guesses Alice's phone password and connects with her while driving to her next stop based on the things she likes from her phone. He drops her off at a hospital, where he sees her boyfriend Joshua Donovan. Samir sits in his car outside Alice's house, where Josh mistakes him for a Lyft driver. Samir drives to his home and learns Joshua is married with children. He threatens to tell Alice. Samir goes to one of Alice's listings and they later go on a date, but after arriving home his mother confronts him for lying. Samir goes to Alice's house but finds she has reconnected with Josh, who has split from his wife. The two argue, leading Alice to leave both of them. Josh confronts Samir, who then runs him down. At his trial, Samir is found guilty of second-degree murder. Cast: Adam Bakri, Julia Goldani Telles, Matthew James Thomas, and Anne Bedian
14	14	"Jessie's Story"	Michael Offer	Maile Meloy	May 2, 2023	1.90
In Brooklyn, teenager Jessie is on trial for breaking and entering. After a genetic disorder forces her to quit running, Jessie asks her mother Kara (Betsy Brandt) about her father, who was a sperm donor, but Kara is resistant. After Jessie is caught taking a DNA kit, Kara gives her a sperm bank file that says her father died in a car accident. She is also opposed to her daughter being in a relationship with their neighbor Will. After failing to get info from the sperm bank by phone, Jessie steals a keycard while Will distracts the receptionist. They break in and find the files, but Will notices they appear different from the one Kara gave. After noticing they tripped an alarm the two flee, but Jessie's disorder forces her to stay and be arrested. Before the trial Kara talks to Will's father Donovan and informs him that he is Jessica's father. Will discovers this from Jessie's DNA kit, and he and his sister Fern confront their dad, who tells their mother Andrea (Natalie Brown) about the affair. Jessie is found guilty but receives a light sentence with no prison time. Kara tells Andrea they're thinking of moving, but she convinces her to stay. Cast: Betsy Brandt, Bebe Wood, Josh Hamilton, Natalie Brown, and Skylar Gaertner
15	15	"Billy's Story"	Julie Hébert	Bronwyn Garrity	May 9, 2023	1.61
In Lansing, Michigan, aging musician Billy Carlson (Keith Carradine) pleads guilty to manslaughter. After Billy's son Leo sets a fire after overdosing, he is sent to rehab. After Leo's release he is met with his more successful siblings Tommy and Ramona, the former of whom shows disdain for Leo. Billy is recording a greatest hits album, and Leo wishes to include one of his unpublished songs, but Billy disagrees. After hearing his parents arguing, Leo takes some of Billy's cancer medication and goes boating with his daughter Jo Jo, causing him to pass out and nearly crash. Billy and his wife Anne make the decision to take custody of Jo Jo, with Billy paying her drug-addicted mother Dana and her boyfriend to convince her to sign over custody. When Leo learns he's being sent back to rehab he demands to see Jo Jo, who is with Ramona. After leaving, Billy hears his unpublished song being played and realizes Leo is overdosing. Anne begins to administer narcan but hesitates and ultimately destroys the needle. When paramedics arrive, Billy takes responsibility, and the judge sentences him to four years in prison, which is likely a death sentence for him. Cast: Keith Carradine, Evan Gamble, Lyla Porter-Follows, Skywalker Hughes, and Laila Robins

=== Season 2 (2024) ===
No. overall	No. in season	Title	Directed by	Written by	Original release date	U.S. viewers (millions)
16	1	"Lorraine's Story"	Sameh Zoabi	Mike Skerrett	October 8, 2024	1.75
In Charlotte, North Carolina, psychic Lorraine Howell (Felicity Huffman) is on trial for obstruction. Lorraine, who lives in Branson, Missouri, once helped police find a missing girl in Nevada. After seeing a report on missing boy Rory Conley, who was abducted a year prior, she calls Charlotte Police to say she sees a vision of him alive, mentioning a toy car Rory had been holding. She flies to Charlotte, where father Frank (Daniel Maslany) believes but mother Melissa is skeptical. After several months, Lorraine sees a vision of a vehicle, but the detective refuses to listen, mentioning six other cases Lorraine failed to solve. The detective later says a man confessed to murdering Rory and two other boys, but Lorraine claims he's wrong, as Rory's body is the only one not present. Melissa kicks Lorraine out, but Frank still believes her. Melissa tells Lorraine she's being prosecuted, but she won't cooperate unless Lorraine tells Frank she was wrong. Lorraine refuses. The defense attorney shows a video showing the detective pressuring the killer into confessing to Rory's death. Lorraine is found not guilty, and Frank tells her to call if she gets any visions, but his relationship with Melissa is damaged. Cast: Felicity Huffman, Isabel Arraiza, José Zúñiga, Daniel Maslany, and William H. Macy
17	2	"April's Story"	Jonathan Mostow	Laurie Sandell & Amy Spencer	October 15, 2024	1.38
In New Carlisle, Ohio, nurse April Harris (Taylor Schilling) is on trial for vehicular assault and reckless driving. After driving her son Wyatt to school, April gets coffee, but in the parking lot accidentally hits a BMW with her door when she's leaving. After arguing with the driver (Justin Chambers), April leaves. As she drives to work, April gets a call that Wyatt had an outburst and needs to be picked up. April calls her husband (Danny Pino), then notices the BMW following her. She calls 911, but her phone dies. April flees to a gas station and calls again. The BMW driver confronts her in the parking lot and kicks her car before leaving. Angry, April pursues him. The two are side-by-side when a truck forces April to swerve right, hitting the driver's car and causing an accident. When he comes to, the driver attacks April. She grabs a bar to defend herself, but as the driver approaches he is struck by a passing pick-up truck. At trial, Wyatt has an outburst and has to leave. April pleads guilty and apologizes for her actions but asks for leniency. She is fined $10,000 and sentenced to three years in prison. Cast: Taylor Schilling, Danny Pino, and Justin Chambers
18	3	"Marcus' Story"	Clark Johnson	Teleplay by : Howard Gordon & Maahir Khan; Story by : Howard Gordon & Brandon Sonnier & Brandon Margolis	October 22, 2024	1.39
In Sacramento, California, tech entrepreneur Marcus Paul (Nick Cannon) is on trial for involuntary manslaughter. At his son's birthday party, Marcus and programmer Pete Vanderkamp (Patrick J. Adams) learn that Google wishes to buy their facial-recognition company Caraxon. That night, Marcus receives a phone call claiming Xavier Skilling, who police murdered after Caraxon misidentified him as a suspect, was killed because of the company, and they send analytics finding that Caraxon misidentifies Black and Asian people at higher rates. Pete, who covered up the discrepancy, is dismissive of Marcus' concerns. The blackmailer, Caraxon employee Mary Wax, calls them. Marcus tells his wife (Jerrika Hinton), who says Skillings' murder was the fault of the police, not Caraxon. After Pete confronts Mary, Marcus tells him he will not be signing the LOI. The two argue, escalating into a physical fight that ends with Pete falling over a stairwell railing to his death. At trial, Mary, who was convicted of extortion, testifies against Marcus. Marcus is found not guilty, and he addresses the court, apologizing to Skillings' widow (LisaGay Hamilton) and vowing to honor him in his work by confronting the issues he should have addressed before Skillings' death. Cast: Nick Cannon, Patrick J. Adams, Amanda Zhou, David Reale, Jerrika Hinton, and LisaGay Hamilton
19	4	"Justin's Story"	Tazbah Rose Chavez	Mike Skerrett	November 12, 2024	1.19
In Bucks County, Pennsylvania, wrestling coach Justin Ward (Michael Chiklis) is on trial for manslaughter. Star wrestler TJ Ellis narrowly wins a match with a Duke University recruiter (Trevor White) watching. TJ's parents are conflicted over the time he spends wrestling. Justin confronts TJ over worsening grades, but shortly after he finds TJ buying steroids from a teammate. He goes to tell TJ's parents but finds the recruiter there, who offers a partial scholarship with potential for a full-ride if he keeps winning. Justin agrees to hide TJ's steroid use as long as he stops using them. At his last match, a doping officer arrives to pat-down TJ in a bathroom. He passes, but Justin leaves a bottle for him. TJ wins, but shortly after collapses and dies of a heart condition exacerbated by steroid use. His mother tells Justin she faked TJ's medical forms, which would have caught his steroid use earlier. At trial, Justin's attorney moves to present the forged document but Justin stops him. He tells the court he only wished for TJ to get the chance Justin's teammates didn't, and he is found guilty, seeing TJ in the audience as he is escorted out. Cast: Michael Chiklis, Andrew Liner, Sherri Saum, Trevor White, Stephen Thomas Kalyn, and Lee Tergesen
20	5	"Margot's Story"	Milan Cheylov	Daniel Pearle	November 19, 2024	1.27
In Chicago, receptionist Margot Holloway (Debra Winger) is charged with fraud, conspiracy, and assault. After overhearing her boss discussing firing her, Margot quits and joins a ballroom class with her friends Connie (Mercedes Ruehl) and Debra (Christine Ebersole), taught by Alexei Volkov. Connie gives Alexei a check so he can fund his own studio. Margot begins taking private lessons with Alexei and agrees to go to a café with him, while Connie secretly watches. At their gin rummy game, Connie argues with Margot over her involvement in the studio. Margot gives Alexei a check taken from her IRA. Connie confronts Margot, saying a developer hadn't heard of Alexei and that federal agents told her his real name is Victor Kakitis. Margot leaves with Debra's gun and confronts Victor, who shows her he destroyed her checks. When police and FBI arrive, Connie holds them at gunpoint, allowing Victor to escape. Connie testifies against Margot, while Debra testifies in her favor. Margot testifies that she was a victim and that she made Victor transfer the money to offshore accounts. She is acquitted of fraud and conspiracy but convicted of assault. A year later, Margot is on parole and has repaired her friendship with Connie and Debra. Cast: Debra Winger, Mercedes Ruehl, Christine Ebersole, and Matthew James Thomas
21	6	"Val's Story"	Maile Meloy	Maile Meloy	November 26, 2024	1.51
In Hillsboro, Oregon, Valentina Pierce (Cobie Smulders) is accused of killing her abusive ex-husband Trey Winter (Eric Johnson). After applying to a medical chauffeur position, Val drops her son Oliver off at his step-mother Jordan's house. Val asks Trey for permission to sell her late friend's sculpture; he refuses. Val breaks into Trey's home to steal the sculpture but finds him dead by electrocution. She begins CPR but does not call 911. Instead, she goes to a go-kart track and convinces Jordan to let her take him for the evening. Jordan calls to tell Val of Trey's death. A detective questions Val and shows her doorbell camera footage of her breaking in, and she is arrested. Jordan tells Val she knows she is innocent. At trial, Val's lawyer gets Jordan to confess that Trey was abusive and she killed him. Jordan says she tampered with Trey's welding equipment after he strangled her. Val's charges are dropped, but Jordan is charged instead. Before Jordan's trial, Val tells the prosecutor she will confess to murder on the stand to get Jordan's charges dropped, and Val cannot be re-charged with murder because of double jeopardy laws. Jordan's charges are dropped, and the two raise Oliver together. Cast: Cobie Smulders, Vella Lovell, Shawn Doyle, Kai Kirton, Eric Johnson, and Dina Shihabi
22	7	"Eugene's Story"	Michael Chiklis	Teleplay by : Albert Shin; Story by : Maile Meloy	December 3, 2024	1.46
In Lowell, Massachusetts, jewelry store owner Eugene Park (Ken Jeong) is on trial for murder. Eugene notices strange behavior in his wife Grace (Jamie Chung), a former addict. He follows her from a church event, where he sees her meeting with a man, Rex Silva (Zane Holtz). Eugene confronts Grace at home, who says he is an ex-boyfriend who she is helping financially after he left prison for a deadly armed robbery. Eugene secretly meets Rex, and asks him to leave town for Topeka, where his cousin owns a factory. Rex counters that Grace was involved in the robbery, which Grace confirms, and blackmails Eugene. That night, Eugene's father-in-law Lee calls Eugene to report a robbery, and Eugene notices Grace missing. An officer tells Eugene the vault was unlocked, causing Lee to suffer a heart attack. Store neighbor Hannah Choi tells Eugene she saw Grace and Rex in the store. Eugene tracks them to a motel with Lee's gun. He and Rex fight, and the gun discharges, hitting Grace. At trial, Rex claims Eugene intentionally killed Grace. Eugene, a devout Christian, says he wished to prove he loved Grace regardless of her past, but admits to firing the gun, and he is found guilty. Cast: Ken Jeong, Jamie Chung, Zane Holtz, Keong Sim, Vicki Kim, John Cassini, and Dor Gvirtsman
23	8	"Megan's Story"	Milan Cheylov	Bronwyn Garrity	December 3, 2024	1.27
In San Marino, California, in a time where generative AI and robots are commonplace, AI music prompter Megan Neumann (Sonequa Martin-Green) is on trial for manslaughter. Due to her job, Megan does not have the energy to have sex with her husband John (Mike Colter), a former musician who wants children. She meets her sister Lila (Jade Eshete) and asks about a sex robot she's helping develop for Humanix, acquiring a test robot for John. He is initially opposed to the robot (Kiara Barnes), who he names Eve, but changes his mind after speaking to her. Megan grows jealous of Eve, who John spends more time with than her. That night, she arrives home after John misses a meeting and finds him with Eve. She asks Lila to send Eve back, but she refuses. Megan gets impregnated with frozen embryos, but John says he's leaving her for Eve. Megan kills him with a bottle in anger. At trial, Lila claims Eve killed John. The prosecution calls Eve, who plays a video of her killing John, and Megan is acquitted. Lila, who had been fired from Humanix, initially refuses to talk to Megan until she offers a job at the music company as chief technology officer. Cast: Sonequa Martin-Green, Mike Colter, Kiara Barnes, Jade Eshete, James Cade, Rebecca Liddiard, Sergio Di Zio

== Production ==
In May 2021, it was announced Fox had given a straight-to-series order to Accused produced by Howard Gordon, Alex Gansa and David Shore based on the 2010 BBC One series of the name. In November 2022, it was announced Accused would air as part of Fox's midseason schedule on January 22, 2023. In March 2023, Fox renewed the series for a second season. The second season premiered on October 8, 2024.

== Reception ==
=== Ratings ===
The premiere episode had more than 11.3 million viewers and a 2.3 rating among the 18-49 demographic in the three days after its premiere on multi-platforms. It is the highest-rated and most-watched debut on Fox in 3 years.

==== Overall ====
Viewership and ratings per season of Accused
Season	Timeslot (ET)	Episodes	First aired		Last aired		TV season
Season	Timeslot (ET)	Episodes	Date	Viewers (millions)	Date	Viewers (millions)	TV season
1	Sunday 10:00 p.m. (1); Tuesday 9:00 p.m. (2–15)	15	January 22, 2023	8.71	May 9, 2023	1.61	2022–23
2	Tuesday 9:00 p.m. (1–6, 8); Tuesday 8:00 p.m. (7)	8	October 8, 2024	1.75	December 3, 2024	1.27	2024–25

==== Season 1 ====
Viewership and ratings per episode of Accused
No.	Title	Air date	Rating (18–49)	Viewers (millions)	DVR (18–49)	DVR viewers (millions)	Total (18–49)	Total viewers (millions)
1	"Scott's Story"	January 22, 2023	2.1	8.71	0.3	1.43	2.3	10.14
2	"Ava's Story"	January 24, 2023	0.5	2.45	0.2	1.37	0.6	3.81
3	"Danny's Story"	January 31, 2023	0.3	2.46	—N/a	—N/a	—N/a	—N/a
4	"Kendall's Story"	February 14, 2023	0.3	2.24	—N/a	—N/a	—N/a	—N/a
5	"Robyn's Story"	February 21, 2023	0.3	2.00	—N/a	—N/a	—N/a	—N/a
6	"Naataanii's Story"	February 28, 2023	0.2	1.58	—N/a	—N/a	—N/a	—N/a
7	"Brenda's Story"	March 7, 2023	0.3	2.08	—N/a	—N/a	—N/a	—N/a
8	"Laura's Story"	March 14, 2023	0.3	1.86	—N/a	—N/a	—N/a	—N/a
9	"Jack's Story"	March 21, 2023	0.2	1.85	—N/a	—N/a	—N/a	—N/a
10	"Esme's Story"	March 28, 2023	0.2	1.85	—N/a	—N/a	—N/a	—N/a
11	"Jiro's Story"	April 4, 2023	0.2	1.69	—N/a	—N/a	—N/a	—N/a
12	"Morgan's Story"	April 11, 2023	0.2	1.80	—N/a	—N/a	—N/a	—N/a
13	"Samir's Story"	April 25, 2023	0.2	1.61	—N/a	—N/a	—N/a	—N/a
14	"Jessie's Story"	May 2, 2023	0.2	1.90	—N/a	—N/a	—N/a	—N/a
15	"Billy's Story"	May 9, 2023	0.2	1.61	—N/a	—N/a	—N/a	—N/a

==== Season 2 ====
Viewership and ratings per episode of Accused
No.	Title	Air date	Rating (18–49)	Viewers (millions)
1	"Lorraine's Story"	October 8, 2024	0.2	1.75
2	"April's Story"	October 15, 2024	0.1	1.38
3	"Marcus' Story"	October 22, 2024	0.2	1.39
4	"Justin's Story"	November 12, 2024	0.1	1.19
5	"Margot's Story"	November 19, 2024	0.1	1.27
6	"Val's Story"	November 26, 2024	0.2	1.51
7	"Eugene's Story"	December 3, 2024	0.2	1.46
8	"Megan's Story"	December 3, 2024	0.2	1.27

=== Critical response ===
The review aggregator website Rotten Tomatoes reported a 61% approval rating with an average rating of 7.3/10, based on 18 critic reviews. The website's critics consensus reads, "While Accused is yet another variation on a very familiar theme, its anthology structure offers enough flexibility and star power for some compelling courtroom stories." Metacritic, which uses a weighted average, assigned a score of 60 out of 100 based on 12 critics, indicating "mixed or average reviews".

Max Gao of The A.V. Club gave the series a B and said, "Offers a fresh take on the typical legal procedural." The Hollywood Reporter's Angie Han wrote, "Without much insight to share, catharsis to offer or even a particularly interesting tone or style to grab us, Accused becomes just another so-so crime drama in an ocean teeming with them." Writing for The Wall Street Journal, John Anderson stated, "Accused may be out to provoke, but it scores more hits than misses. And its sins of indulgence are ultimately well-intended."
