= New-Gen =

Superhero comic book series

New-Gen, styled NEW-GEN, is a superhero comic book series created in 2008 by J.D. Matonti, Chris Matonti and Julia Coppola, of A.P.N.G. Enterprises. It is printed, distributed and advertised by Marvel Comics. The series centers on the war over nanotechnology between two powerful scientists, Gabriel and Deadalus, from the extra-dimensional world of New-Gen.

New-Gen is created by J.D. Matonti, Julia Coppola, and Chris Matonti.The artist for the comic is Abdul Rashid.

== Publication history ==
New-Gen was launched by A.P.N.G. Enterprises and Issue 6 was published and distributed at New York Comic Con in Oct. 2010. The second volume of the comic, New-Gen: New Dawn, debuted at New York Comic Con in October 2011. New-Gen is printed, advertised, and distributed by Marvel Comics. Mark Hamill will lend his voice to characters in New-Gen's upcoming full-length featured film.

=== New-Gen: New Dawn ===
In 2011, A.P.N.G. Enterprises launched their second series, New-Gen: New Dawn. The series' recounts the origin of Gabriel, the manifestation of his abilities, and his arrival in New-Gen.

=== New-Gen: Deadalus Rising ===
Currently, there are plans for the New-Gen franchise to expand to film. New-Gen: DEADALUS RISING is a 3D CGI animated film that continues the story established in the first volume of the New-Gen comic book. The film follows twins Sean and Chris, and Carmen, as they try to protect Earth and New-Gen from Deadalus' plans for vengeance.

=== Other media ===
New-Gen has also expanded into other media:

- A New-Gen animated series with Lena Headey, Luke Wilson, Finn Wolfhard and Anya Chalotra has been announced.
- New-Gen is a transmedia global brand that plans to extend into Motion Comics, Mobile Games, CGI Feature Films, Television Series, Video Games, Toys and Merchandising.
- A.P.N.G. Enterprises announced the development of a New-Gen movie, written by Alison Wilgus, to star Mark Hamill.
- A.P.N.G. also announced the development of motion comics developed and distributed by Visionbooks.

== Plot ==
New-Gen is an extra-dimensional world where science and technology reign supreme. Nanotechnology controls a huge amount of the world's features, including weather, architecture, energy and materials science. The scientist Gabriel, pioneer in nanotechnology, strives for good and the betterment of his world through the use of his technology. However, his apprentice Deadalus grows ruthless and seeks to use the nanobots to gain power and control over New-Gen. Deadalus unleashes a powerful, unpredictable type of nanotechnology on the world, which infects several of the children of New-Gen, changing them into super-powered creatures. Gabriel defeats Deadalus and banishes him to the underworld. Gabriel then takes in all the children affected by his nanotechnology in order to protect and train them in the use of their powers, founding the Association for the Protection of the New Generation (A.P.N.G.) in the process. Fearing his infant twin sons, Chris and Sean, were affected, Gabriel sends them to Earth in present-day New York City to protect them from Deadalus, much to the dismay of his wife Thea. While trapped in the underworld, Deadalus finds fierce robo-insectoid creatures called MetalMites that he can mentally control. After discovering that the Mites can dig into other dimensions, he vows to get back to New-Gen and get revenge on Gabriel.

Years later, Deadalus escapes the underworld and begins wreaking havoc on ancient Crete. Gabriel sends the oldest and strongest member of the A.P.N.G., Mini, to dispatch Deadalus and his army of MetalMites. Mini battles the MetalMites, destroying many of them with his horns, but the fight becomes too much for him to handle alone. Gabriel sends the battle-robot, Horus, to help finish the fight against Deadalus and his creatures. When Mini and Horus have Deadalus beaten, Gabriel tells them to let him live, re-banishing Deadalus to the underworld. Throughout the battle, the native Cretans assume Mini is a monster, which eventually leads to the Greek myth of the Minotaur.

Meanwhile, in present-day New York, Chris and Sean prepare to enter a new school in New York City. They are forced to deal with the pressures of fitting in, combined with a growing distance between them and their adoptive parents, and strange visions of Gabriel and Deadalus, of whom they know nothing. On New-Gen, Gabriel encounters challenges finding the best way of teaching the A.P.N.G.. Simultaneously, in the underworld, Deadalus discovers an enormous quantity of dormant microbots. The microbots respond and behave much like the nanobots he worked with on New-Gen. Deadalus plans to use the microbots to gain power over other worlds and dimensions. He infects himself with the microbots, much like he infected the children of New-Gen, in order to have them reconstruct his body and gain superhuman powers.

Deadalus' physiology is drastically altered, transforming him into a demonic beast and furthering his lust for power into genuine megalomaniac insanity. He adopts the identity of Sly, and sets his MetalMites to tunneling into a new world to conquer for his own. Additionally, he uses the microbots to upgrade the MetalMites, increasing their destructive power. Once Sly begins taking over the futuristic world of Nu-Mangi, Mini is sent in to stop him once again. However, Sly and his upgraded MetalMites prove far too powerful for Mini alone. The remaining members of the A.P.N.G., Flyer, Diamond, Gazelle, and Roboduck, join Mini for the battle.

The battle rages on the surface of the new world, as the A.P.N.G. destroy wave after wave of MetalMites. Sean and Chris keep getting increasingly vivid glimpses of the battle while at school, but are clueless as to why they are being plagued by the visions. During a lull in the battle, Sly flees and the A.P.N.G. rests knowing another wave is soon to come. Gabriel, observing the battle from New-Gen, holds up several glowing green orbs full of nanobots. Sly, determined to destroy the A.P.N.G. finds machines built by the natives of the new world. He uses his microbots to take over the machines and turn them into larger, more powerful MetalMites. As the twins' visions become more and more clear, they complain of pain and discomfort as their bodies begin to change, alarming their parents as well as Gabriel who is watching them from New-Gen.

During the battle, the A.P.N.G. show signs of victory until Sly shoots them all with a specialized radiation, destroying all of the nanobots in their bodies, reverting them to their human forms and taking away their powers. Just as Sly is about to finish the A.P.N.G. off, Gabriel teleports to the battle wielding his Kane. He gives the A.P.N.G. the green orbs, containing nanobots that will heal the A.P.N.G. and restore their super-powered forms. As the members A.P.N.G. fight the giant machines, Gabriel battles Sly. The two former friends fight brutally, landing crushing blows and unleashing powerful energy bolts against each other. Eventually, Gabriel and the A.P.N.G. overcome Sly and his forces, but Gabriel decides to again spare Sly, saying he is not ready to finish off his old friend.

== Characters ==
=== Gabriel ===
Gabriel
- Gabriel. Art by Abdul H. Rashid.

In-story information
- Alter ego: John Gabriel
- Abilities: Genius level intellect Technopathy; Telekinesis; Superhuman strength Able to travel to any point in time and space Energy blasts

Gabriel is the founder and leader of the A.P.N.G., and the leading scientific mind in the field of nanotechnology on the world of New-Gen. Gabriel was born under the name Gabriam in ancient Egypt as the son of the Pharaoh and possessed a genius-level understanding of science, particularly alchemy. Following the death of his father, Gabriam ascended to the role of Pharaoh, before beginning a journey across the universe to achieve balance and gain control over his abilities.

Through his technological advancements and careful cooperation with his wife, Thea (a guardian of the natural world), Gabriel revolutionized life on New-Gen, creating an almost utopian society. After his apprentice Deadalus released his nanobots onto the public of New-Gen, Gabriel apprehended Deadalus and banished him to the underworld as punishment. Gabriel then sent his twin sons, Sean and Chris, to present-day New York City on Earth, to protect them from further attacks by Deadalus. Gabriel took in a group of children who had been mutated by the nanobots and trained them to become heroes.

After taking in the children whose bodies were affected by Deadalus' nanobots, Gabriel and Thea train them in the responsible use of their powers, with the end goal of forming a super-powered team to combat against those who would seek to threaten the lives of the innocent. Gabriel sends the oldest and best trained member, Mini, and the combat robot Horus, to dispatch Deadalus after he resurfaces in ancient Crete and begins wreaking havoc. When Mini had defeats Deadalus, Gabriel commands Mini to banish Deadalus again rather than kill him.

Gabriel banishing Deadalus to the underworld.

Gabriel's powers stem from his complete mastery of the nanotechnology he has implanted within himself. He possess superhuman strength, the ability to emit powerful energy blasts, and telekinetic abilities (and by extension, flight). He is also able to teleport himself and others to any point in time and space instantaneously. Gabriel also possesses a genius level intellect, and regularly creates both nanobots and large robots to perform specific, complex tasks. He also possesses the Kane, a rod made of nanobots that he can change the shape of according to his will. It also seems to serve as a means for him to focus or augment his powers, allowing him to bend the fabric of time and space.

When Deadalus emerges from the underworld onto Zadaar III, transformed by microbots into the insane and brutal Sly, Gabriel sends Mini to dispatch him again. However, it becomes clear that Mini is not strong enough to take out Sly's entire army of enhanced MetalMites by himself, so Gabriel teleports the remaining members of the team to help. Gabriel prepares to join the fray himself, carrying with him six green orbs containing highly advanced nanotechnology. Just before Gabriel arrives, Sly shoots the A.P.N.G. with an energy blast that removes the nanobots in their bodies, leaving them powerless. Gabriel, enraged, teleported to the battle and gave each member of the A.P.N.G. one of the green orbs, restoring their powers. Gabriel then engages Sly one on one, banishing him for the third time to the underworld.

=== Deadalus ===
Deadalus
- Deadalus. Art by Abdul H. Rashid.

In-story information
- Alter ego: Sly; Sylvester Deadalus
- Abilities: Technopathy; Super strength

Born on New-Gen after Gabriel had already arrived and begun his work, Deadalus possesses, in his unaltered state, a genius-level intellect and the ability to exert his influence over machines using sheer force of will. By using his technopathic abilities, he is able to control both the MetalMites and microbots that he discovered living in the underworld. The MetalMites act as a standing army for him, and serve as a means for Deadalus to travel by digging through the crust of the underworld.

Deadalus was once Gabriel's apprentice. Together the two made scientific advancements, particularly in nanotechnology, but had a falling out after Gabriel refused to allow Deadalus to use their discoveries to save his terminally ill wife because of doubts about its suitability for human trials. Following his wife's death, Deadalus began experimenting to make the inhabitants of New-Gen "perfect", invulnerable citizens and becomes enraged when Gabriel seeks to stop him, believing his experiments are unethical. Gabriel is victorious in their battle and banishes Deadalus to the underworld, which he quickly makes his base of operations. After discovering MetalMites and microbots, techno-organic creatures which he controls through mental force, Deadalus takes control of the destructive technology. His self-afflicted microbot infection drives him towards a more bestial state of consciousness and transforms him into a demonic being.

Deadalus after his transformation into Sly

==== Invasion of Zadaar III ====
Sly eventually digs his way through the crust of a futuristic city called Zadaar III and almost immediately begins to wreak havoc on it. He uses his microbots to alter the technology in the city into giant, weaponized robots, similar to the MetalMites. Gabriel dispatches Mini once again to deal with him, but Sly and his forces prove too powerful for Mini to defeat on his own. As Mini became overwhelmed, Gabriel sent the rest of the A.P.N.G. to deal with Sly. Sly, using his newly augmented powers, shoots the A.P.N.G. with radiation that killed the nanobots in their bodies, causing the team to revert to their unaltered human forms. As he is about to finish the team off, Sly was attacked by Gabriel, who restores the team's powers with his nanomachines. After a battle, Gabriel banishes Sly back to the underworld.

=== Thea ===
Thea
- Thea. Art by Abdul H. Rashid.

In-story information
- Abilities: Precognition; Levitation

Thea is the wife of Gabriel, mother to the twins Sean and Chris, and one of principal educators for the A.P.N.G.

Thea possesses the ability to see into the future, as well as to other points in the time-space continuum, much like her son Sean seems to be able to. She also seems to possess the ability to levitate herself and other objects.

Thea was one of the caretakers for the natural world of New-Gen before Gabriel arrived. Thea's levitation and clairvoyant abilities make her a formidably powerful match for Gabriel. She is strong willed and passionate in her actions, but possesses a motherly instinct. The two soon fell in love and with each of their individual talents, found a way to balance the natural world of New-Gen with the technological advances Gabriel made to also improve the world. The decision to send their sons, Sean and Chris, to Earth is a source of constant conflict between the two powerful beings. Thea even leaves for a time to return to her former home. Eventually, however, she returns to take over the co-tutelage of the children of New-Gen at A.P.N.G. Headquarters. Sean and Chris eventually develop powers of their own after being infected with nanobots, experiencing visions of the A.P.N.G.'s battle with Sly.

=== Mini ===
Mini
- Mini. Art by Abdul H. Rashid.

In-story information
- Species: Human (mutated)
- Abilities: Anthropomorphic bovine form Super-strength; Superhuman durability

Minotaur was only a little older than the other children when Deadalus' nanobots transformed him into an anthropomorphic bull. He possesses incredible superhuman strength and durability, able to rip a MetalMite in half with nothing but his hands while sustaining minimal injuries. Using his strength in his legs, Mini is capable of leaping enormous distances. He also has been known to headbutt enemies to pieces using his horns. Mini is an accomplished brawler and excellent strategist. He also has been outfitted with a wrist mounted grappling hook.

He has a staunch and aggressive temperament, much like that of a real bull. He has a nasty temper, but remains a stalwart and loyal companion to his friends. He serves as the drill sergeant and de facto field leader for the A.P.N.G. He is often the first member of the team dispatched by Gabriel in many combat situations. His mutation gave him, in addition to a physically altered body, highly increased strength and durability, which he uses to his advantage in battle when running headlong into enemies with his sharp horns.

When Deadalus discovers that his MetalMites can be used to enter different planes of existence, he emerges during ancient times on Crete and begins wreaking havoc on the populace. Mini, as the oldest and best trained member of the A.P.N.G., is sent to dispatch Deadalus and save Crete's citizens. His exploits evolve into the legend of the Minotaur.

=== Roboduck ===
Roboduck
- Roboduck. Art by Abdul H. Rashid.

In-story information
- Alter ego: None
- Species: Robot
- Abilities: Arm-mounted plasma cannons, flight, powerful plasma burp

Roboduck is a first-generation battle robot who possesses an advanced, plasma--based, weapon system for use in ranged combat. His arms transform into plasma cannons from which he can fire bolts of plasma. He can also burp a more powerful fire blast from his mouth, but he has trouble controlling it. Roboduck is also capable of flight, enabled by thrusters in his feet and elbows. After being infected by Deadalus' nanobots, Roboduck lost the ability to gain and process information like a robot. However, the nanobots gave Roboduck the ability to learn and think like a human. This allows him to think more analytically, feel more emotion, and improvise more effectively than most other robots on New-Gen.

After Sly burrows out of the underworld onto Zadaar IV with his army of MetalMites and microbots, Roboduck is sent, along with the rest of the members of the A.P.N.G. to fight, after Sly's forces prove too powerful for Mini to beat on his own. When Sly deactivates the nanobots inside the A.P.N.G., he also disables Roboduck's entire operating system, rendering him inert for a brief period of time. Gabriel resurrects Roboduck when he arrives and gives all the members of the A.P.N.G. specially designed nano-gloves, restoring them to full power.

=== Diamond ===
Diamond
- Diamond. Art by Abdul H. Rashid.

In-story information
- Alter ego: Kent Chang
- Abilities: Invulnerable diamond hard skin Limited super strength Elite martial artist

Diamond was born on New-Gen, and was only a few years old when he was mutated by Deadalus' nanobots, causing his skin to harden into a diamond-like substance. Gabriel adopted the young Diamond in order to train him in the proper use of his powers.

During his years of schooling, presided over by Gabriel and his wife, Thea, Diamond became an exceptionally hard and disciplined worker. He took his martial arts training especially seriously. Diamond became a bit of a perfectionist in the eyes of his teammates as he matured. He regularly took place in combat and tactical training exercises, as well as standard schooling in various academic fields of study.

Diamond's crystalline skin gives him superhuman strength and durability. It is common for other members of the A.P.N.G. to throw him at larger foes, as his density and invulnerability ensures that he will do maximum damage and will incur minimal harm upon himself. Diamond also seems to possess a limited degree of super strength, as he is able to destabilize larger, dense foes with his attacks. Diamond appears to be able to slightly change his shape when angered, generating sharp protrusions from his body.

In addition to his powers, Diamond is also a highly skilled martial artist, with an advanced knowledge of many fighting styles. Gabriel gave him and Mini a wrist-mounted grappling hook for use in battle.

=== Flyer ===
Flyer
- Flyer. Art by Abdul H. Rashid.

In-story information
- Alter ego: Jude Jackson
- Abilities: Flight via leathery wings

Jude grew a pair of large, bat-like wings as a result of his infection. Gabriel took him in as a student and member of the A.P.N.G. as a means to ensure his safety and his ability to use his powers for good.

Flyer's education and training were administered by Gabriel and Thea, over the course of many years. In addition to classroom study of various academic fields, he often took part in large scale combat and tactical drills. He proved to be a hard worker, if a bit cocky and arrogant. Gazelle, his best friend and constant rival on the squad, consistently challenged him to contests of speed throughout their training and maturing, leaving him a fierce competitor.

Flyer possesses a pair of large bat-like wings that allow him to fly at extremely high speeds. The wings are strong enough to support at least one passenger in flight, but are not indestructible.

=== Gazelle ===
Gazelle
- Gazelle. Art by Abdul H. Rashid.

In-story information
- Alter ego: Elle
- Abilities: Anthropomorphic gazelle-like form Superhuman speed Enhanced reflexes

Elle was one of the children from the world of New-Gen granted extraordinary abilities by Deadalus' nanobot infestation. She is a founding member of the A.P.N.G. superhero team.

Gazelle's mutation transformed her into a humanoid creature appearing similar to her namesake, with two horns, fur, hoofed feet, and an elongated snout. The nanobots also afforded her with tremendous speed and agility. She often expresses jealousy towards her friends who look more human than she does, but on the whole is a very caring and nurturing figure. She continually competes with Flyer, one of her best friends.

=== Sean and Chris ===
Sean and Chris are the twin children of Gabriel and Thea. They were sent to Earth as babies, under the care of robot parents to keep them safe from Deadalus when he unleashed his nanites upon New-Gen. The two boys know nothing of their origins, their true parents or their true place of birth. Whether the two of them grow to have any Nanopowers like the rest of the A.P.N.G. remains to be conclusively seen, but they have vivid visions of the battle on Zaadar III between the A.P.N.G. and Sly.

=== Nate Guard ===
A sentient robot constructed by Gabriel under the watchful eye of Thea, Nature Guardian or Nate Guard, was built to monitor New-Gen's electro-magnetosphere and the precise balance of the nanobots and technology that currently works in concert with the natural environment of New-Gen. If there are problems with either, he fixes it or alerts the A.P.N.G. if he finds the issue to be beyond an everyday occurrence. His sentience, which allows him to gather more information beyond that which is pertinent to his primary directive, gives him an insatiable curiosity. He asks constant questions on the nature of everything, much to the annoyance of other members of the A.P.N.G. He is able to alter his shape, adapting to any situation.

=== Carmen ===
The youngest of the A.P.N.G. and daughter of Deadalus, Carmen works extra hard to prove herself to compensate for her dark legacy. She wants to make sure that everyone knows her as her own, capable formidable person, instead of the daughter of a super-criminal. Since her father was banished, she was taken in by Gabriel and Thea like many other children and always strives to do her best in order to remind everyone, she is far more than her father's daughter.
