= Valiant Comics =

American comic book publisher

- Valiant Comics logo introduced in 2012, designed by Rian Hughes
- Parent company: Voyager Communications (1989–1994); Acclaim Entertainment (1994–2004); Valiant Entertainment (2005–2018); DMG Entertainment (2018–present)
- Founded: October 1989; 37 years ago
- Founder: Jim Shooter; Steven Massarsky
- Country of origin: United States
- Headquarters location: New York City
- Distribution: Diamond Book Distributors
- Key people: Russ Brown, President, Consumer Products, Promotions & Ad Sales; Fred Pierce, publisher
- Publication types: Comics
- Fiction genres: Action; Adventure; Fantasy; Science fiction; Superhero
- Official website: valiantentertainment.com

Valiant Comics is an American comic book publisher, the first incarnation of which was founded in 1989 by former Marvel Comics editor-in-chief Jim Shooter along with lawyer and businessman Steven Massarsky. In 1994, the company was sold to Acclaim Entertainment. After Acclaim's 2004 bankruptcy, the company's assets were purchased as part of Valiant Entertainment by entrepreneurs Dinesh Shamdasani and Jason Kothari in 2005. In 2011, Valiant received a capital infusion from private investment company Cuneo & Company, LLC. Peter Cuneo and Gavin Cuneo joined the company and a relaunch was announced.

Valiant Entertainment launched its publishing division in 2012 as part of an initiative dubbed the "Summer of Valiant", winning Publisher of the Year and being nominated for Book of the Year at the Diamond Gem Awards. Valiant has set sales records, and was the most nominated publisher in comics at the 2014, 2015 and 2016 Harvey Awards, releasing the biggest-selling independent crossover event of the decade with "Book of Death" in 2015.

Valiant was sold to DMG Entertainment in 2018. In June 2023, Valiant Comics announced a licensing partnership with Alien Books, which would take over publishing Valiant's characters.

The company's properties have been adapted to other media, including video games, digital series, and collectible figures. The character Bloodshot was adapted into an eponymous 2020 feature film starring Vin Diesel.

== Publication history ==
=== Voyager Communications ===
Steven J. Massarsky became acquainted with former editor-in-chief of Marvel Comics Jim Shooter when he hired him to write the script for an unproduced live-action Spider-Man television series. As the two worked together on the show, Massarsky floated the idea of Shooter starting his own comic company with the two cementing a partnership between themselves and Winston Fowlkes who had a finance background. According to Shooter, part of what motivated the founding of Valiant was his disillusion with the state of Marvel at the time. Describing his experience at the company at the time, Shooter said:

I think one of the things that went wrong at Marvel was that I got so far removed from all the creative stuff, I spent all my day upstairs arguing with the financial people and lawyers, trying to protect the creative people from being raped and devoured. At the end, I was walking around the place and I didn’t even know everybody’s name, because I delegated too much. Everybody hired their own assistants and then the assistants would get promoted and they would hire their own assistants. There were actually people working at Marvel who I didn’t even know. The people I hired were Louise Jones and Al Milgrom and Larry Hama and Denny O’Neil and Bob Hall- some people I thought came with a bunch of credentials. Toward the end there, as I said, I don’t know if those people had credentials or not, because I don’t know who they were.

In 1988, former editor-in-chief of Marvel Comics Jim Shooter, Steven J. Massarsky and a group of investors attempted to purchase Marvel Entertainment. They submitted the second-highest bid, with financier Ronald Perelman submitting the highest bid and acquiring Marvel. Shooter and Massarsky instead formed Voyager Communications in 1989 with significant venture capital financing from Triumph Capital. Valiant (an imprint of Voyager Communications) recruited numerous writers and artists from Marvel, including Barry Windsor-Smith and Bob Layton, and launched an interconnected line of superhero comics featuring a mixture of licensed characters and original creations. Through a handshake agreement with Richard A. Bernstein of Western Publishing, Shooter managed to secure the rights to characters from Dell and Gold Key Comics such as Magnus, Robot Fighter, Dr. Solar. and Turok: Son of Stone. In addition to the Western Publishing deal giving access to legacied comic book characters, Western also distributed Valiant's World Wrestling Federation and Nintendo children focused line of comics which managed to secure wider distribution beyond the direct market at Kmart, Woolco, Walmart and Toys "R" Us both as comics and in children's book format which achieved considerable success.

In 1991, Valiant released its first title, Magnus, Robot Fighter, cover-dated May 1991. Solar, Man of the Atom, cover-dated September 1991 followed as the next release. Both titles were licenses from Gold Key Comics. Rai became the third title published by Valiant and was distributed as a special insert in Magnus, Robot Fighter beginning with issue 5. Harbinger No. 1 was listed on the top ten list of Wizard magazine for a record eight consecutive months and was eventually named "Collectible of the Decade" while Rai No. 0 appeared on Wizard's top ten list for a new record nine consecutive months. In 1992, Valiant won the Best Publisher under 5% Market Share from comic distributor Diamond. The next year, Valiant won Best Publisher over 5% Market Share, becoming the first publisher outside of Marvel and DC to do so. In 1992, Valiant's editor-in-chief Jim Shooter was given the Lifetime Achievement Award for co-creating the Valiant Universe in a ceremony that also honored Stan Lee for co-creating the Marvel Universe. However, Shooter left Valiant by the end of 1992. According to Massarsky, "Jim had a different idea as to the direction of the company, and he was asked to leave."

Valiant also engaged in several comic book-marketing innovations common in the 1990s, such as issue zero "origin" issues, the gold logo program, coupons redeemable for original comic books, and chromium covers. Following the conclusion of the "Unity" crossover in September 1992, Valiant released Bloodshot, Ninjak, H.A.R.D. Corps, The Second Life of Dr. Mirage, and Timewalker, among other titles.

=== Acclaim Comics ===
In 1994, Voyager Communications was purchased by video game developer and publisher Acclaim Entertainment for $65 million. Acclaim Comics created a number of video games based on Valiant properties, such as Shadow Man, Turok: Dinosaur Hunter, Armorines: Project S.W.A.R.M., and Iron Man and X-O Manowar in Heavy Metal, which featured Valiant's X-O Manowar alongside Marvel's Iron Man. In 2004, after losing a major sports video game license, Acclaim became financially insolvent and filed for Chapter 7 bankruptcy.

In 2005, the rights to Valiant/Acclaim's original characters such as Archer and Armstrong, Rai, and Quantum and Woody were auctioned off and bought by Valiant Entertainment, while the rights to the three licensed characters (Solar, Magnus and Turok) reverted to Classic Media (then-owner of the Gold Key Comics properties), which was acquired by DreamWorks Animation SKG in July 2012. DreamWorks itself was bought by Universal Studios on August 22, 2016.

=== Valiant Entertainment ===
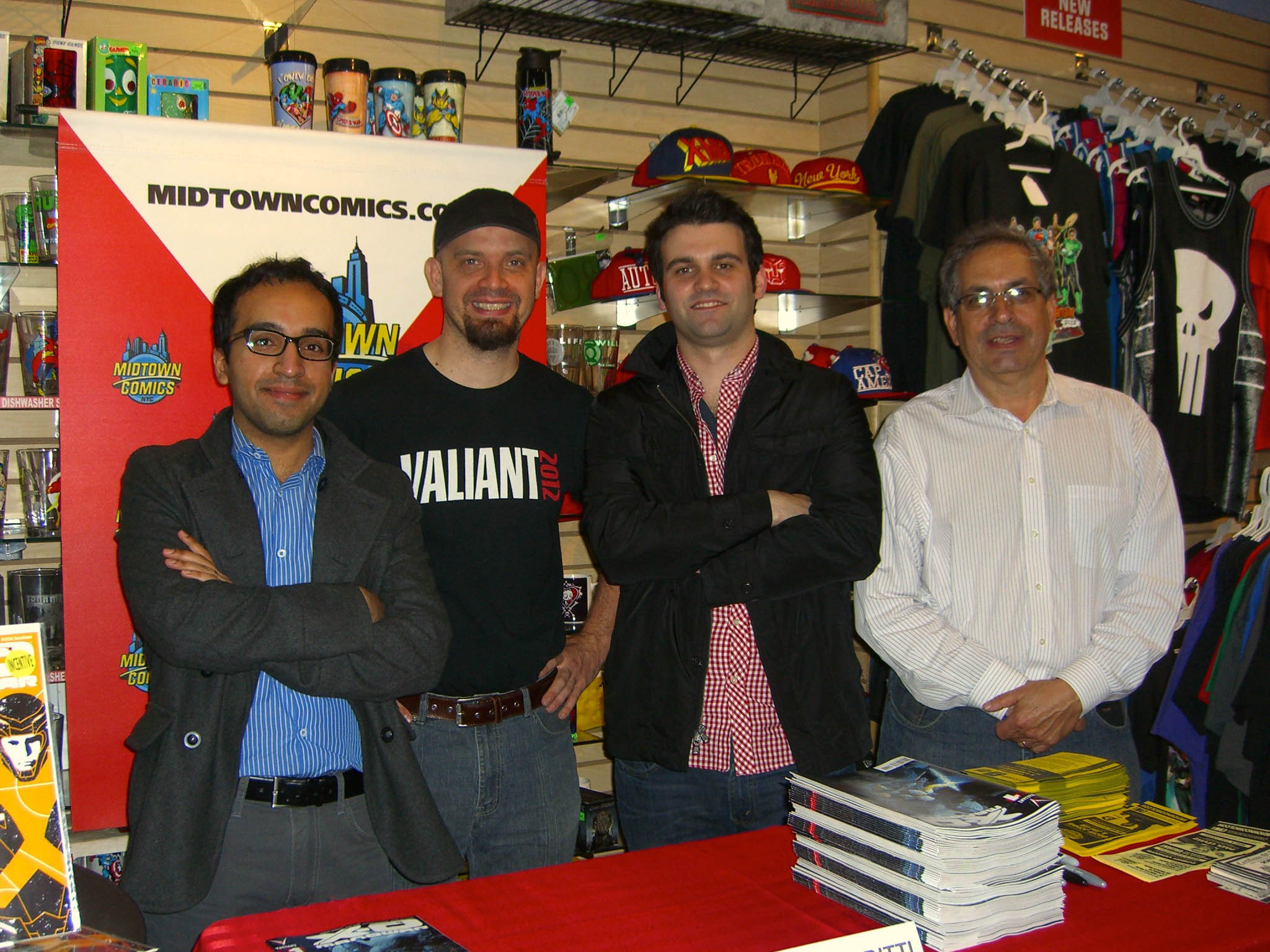
From left to right: Valiant Chief Creative Officer Dinesh Shamdasani, Sales Manager Atom! Freeman, Marketing and Communications Manager Hunter Gorinson and Publisher Fred Pierce at Midtown Comics in Manhattan

In 2005, a group of entrepreneurs led by Dinesh Shamdasani and Jason Kothari raised financing and acquired the rights to the Valiant Comics library from Acclaim Entertainment's estate, forming Valiant Entertainment. In 2007, Valiant hired former Valiant Editor-In-Chief Jim Shooter to write new short stories that would accompany hardcover reprints of classic Valiant Universe stories. Two of the three collections were named among "The Ten Best Collected Editions" of their respective years of publications.. In 2011, Valiant announced that it had received a capital investment from Cuneo & Company. Former Marvel Comics CEO and Vice Chairman Peter Cuneo was named Valiant's chairman and Gavin Cuneo became CFO and COO. Valiant then hired former Marvel editor Warren Simons as executive editor and former president of Wizard, Magazine, Fred Pierce, as Publisher.

In 2012, Valiant Entertainment began publishing new monthly comic books based on the Valiant Comics universe of characters.

In an event dubbed The Summer of Valiant in 2012, Valiant Entertainment launched the Valiant Comics universe with four ongoing titles, X-O Manowar, Harbinger, Bloodshot and Archer & Armstrong, one launching each month for four months. X-O Manowar premiered May 2, 2012, with the creative team of writer Robert Venditti and artist Cary Nord. The first issue of X-O Manowar received over 42,000 preorders, making Valiant the largest new publisher launch in over a decade, and eventually sold through 4 full-priced printings and 3 additional reduced-priced printings. The release of X-O Manowar was followed by Harbinger, launched in June 2012 by writer Joshua Dysart and artist Khari Evans; Bloodshot, launched in July 2012 by writer Duane Swierczynski and artist Manuel Garcia; and Archer & Armstrong, launched in August 2012 by writer Fred Van Lente and artist Clayton Henry.

To coincide with the launch of publishing in 2012, Valiant introduced the Pullbox Program, which encourages readers to start a pull box subscription for the title being launched with their comics store to obtain an exclusive alternate cover version of the comic, and the QR Voice Variant, where the reader's smartphone, after scanning a QR code on the cover of the comic, plays a video of the figure's mouth, giving the impression that the figure has come to life and is talking to the reader.

Valiant Entertainment extended The Summer of Valiant 2012 event and added a fifth ongoing title with Shadowman in November 2012 by writer Justin Jordan and artist Patrick Zircher. The comic debuted as the number 1, non-Marvel and/or DC comic of the month. That month, Valiant announced it would exclusively distribute its digital comics through ComiXology (later acquired by Amazon).

In February 13, Valiant won Comic Book Publisher of the Year – Under 4% and was nominated for Best Comic Book of the Year – Over $3.00 X-O Manowar # 1 at the Diamond Gem Awards.

In January 2013, Valiant announced that Chief Creative Officer and co-founder Dinesh Shamdasani had been promoted to CEO & Chief Creative Officer and Jason Kothari was leaving management. That March, Valiant and Kamite Announced a partnership for Spanish language publishing in Mexico.

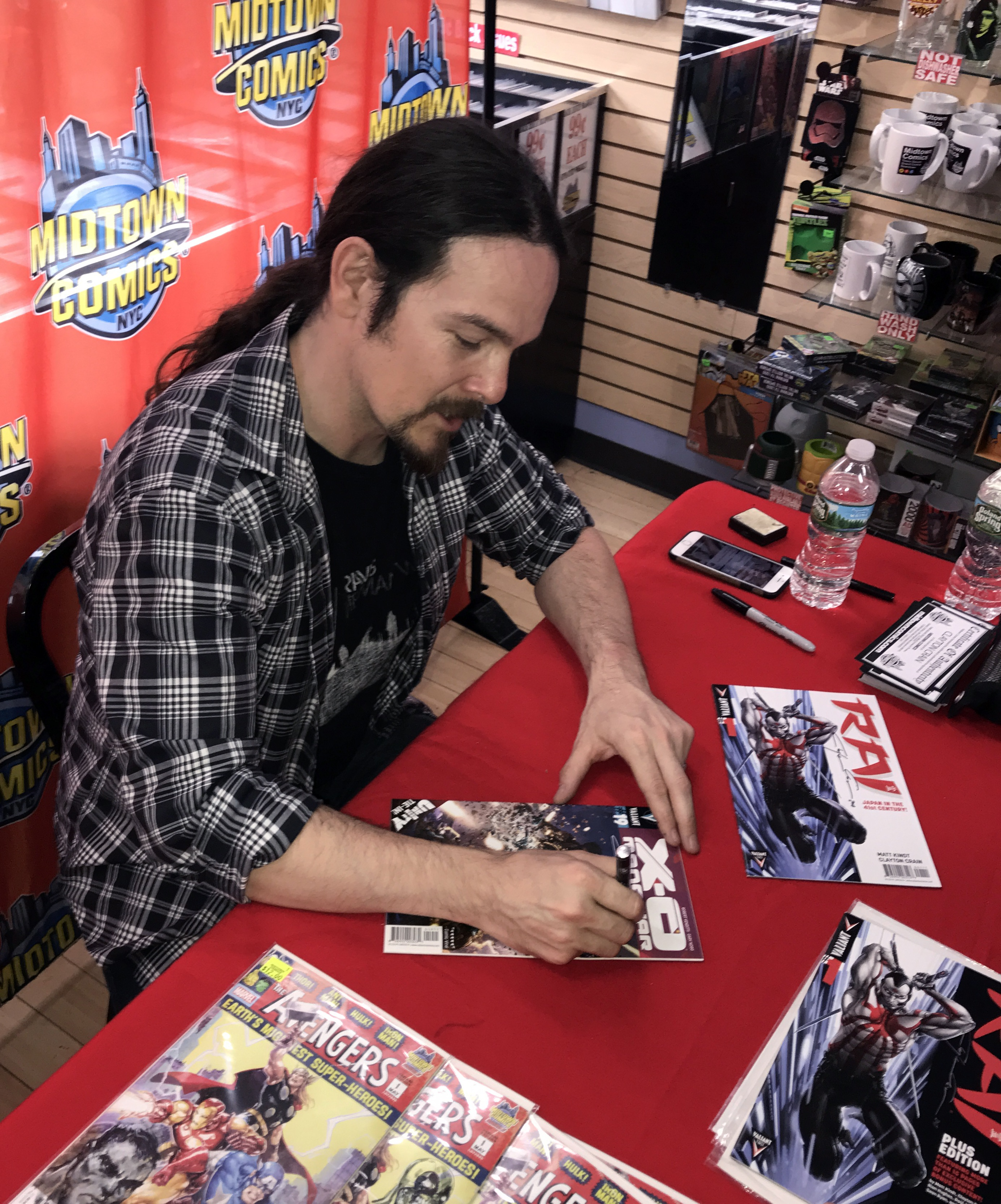
Artist Clayton Crain signing copies of Valiant titles whose covers he has illustrated during an appearance at Midtown Comics in Manhattan

In May 2013, Valiant announced The Summer of Valiant 2013, during which the company would launch two new ongoing titles, Quantum & Woody and Eternal Warrior, and publish a special Bloodshot zero issue. Quantum & Woody, written by James Asmus and drawn by Tom Fowler, launched in July 2013, and became the most-nominated title at the 2014 Harvey Awards. That November, Amazon announced a new license from Valiant Entertainment for its Kindle Worlds platform, Panini and Valiant announced a partnership for foreign language print and digital publishing in France, Italy, and other territories, and Valiant announced ComicCube Publishing as its launch partner in China.

Several of Valiant's launch titles reached their planned conclusions in 2014, with Harbinger, Bloodshot, and Archer & Armstrong all concluding. Valiant celebrated the milestones by publishing a 48-page anniversary issue for each series' twenty-fifth issue, and hinting at new directions for the characters. Ongoing series such as X-O Manowar, Unity, and Rai continued, and were coupled with limited series such as Harbinger: Omegas, Eternal Warrior: Days of Steel, The Death-Defying Dr. Mirage and The Delinquents. In December 2013, Valiant announced the 2014 "Armor Hunters" crossover storyline, consisting of a four-issue Armor Hunter mini-series and issues of XO-Manowar and Unity. In April 2014, Valiant announced several new partnerships with digital distributors, including Visionbooks, to distribute a form of animated Valiant comic books for digital devices. That August, Valiant joined Madefire digital comics on iOS and Android for day-and-date digital releases and digital collections, and also joined iVerse's ComicsPlus with a complete digital comics library.

Following the conclusion of Armor Hunters, Valiant announced its Valiant Next initiative. Launching in December 2014 with the miniseries The Valiant, it continued through 2015 with the ongoing titles Ninjak, Imperium, Ivar, Timewalker and Bloodshot Reborn and the miniseries Divinity. For the summer of 2015, Valiant announced the event miniseries Book of Death, accompanied by one-shots Book of Death: The Fall of Bloodshot, Book of Death: The Fall of Ninjak, Book of Death: The Fall of Harbinger and Book of Death: The Fall of X-O Manowar and the miniseries Book of Death: Legends of the Geomancer. Book of Death was one of the best-reviewed comics of the year and the biggest selling independent crossover event of the decade. Spinning out from Book of Death, the ongoing series Wrath of the Eternal Warrior launched in November 2015.

In 2015, Valiant renewed its print distribution agreement with Diamond Distributors, making Diamond the worldwide distributor of Valiant's comics and graphic novels within comic book specialty and book markets worldwide.

In 2017, Valiant added ten new international publishing partnerships for China, India, South Korea, Pakistan and other comic book specialty and book markets worldwide.

In January 2016, Valiant announced at Valiant Summit 2016 that Valiant would spend 2016 focusing on expanding its universe of characters beyond its core titles, launching brand new characters in the Britannia and Savage miniseries; expanding Divinity in two sequels — Divinity II and Divinity III: Stalinverse; and elevating supporting characters from the Harbinger title in two new miniseries — Generation Zero and Faith. That same month, a four-issue Faith miniseries launched, garnering significant media interest, and was one of only a handful of series in the past decade to reach a fifth printing.

In July 2016, Valiant was nominated for 50 Harvey Awards, the most nominations for any publisher that year, including eight for Bloodshot Reborn.

In 2017, Valiant added ten new international publishing partnerships for China, India, South Korea, Pakistan and other international markets.

==== DMG Entertainment ====
In January 2018, it was announced that DMG Entertainment had acquired Valiant Entertainment. As part of the acquisition, it was announced that Valiant's CEO Dinesh Shamdasani, Chairman Peter Cuneo, and COO Gavin Cuneo would be leaving the company. On February 23, 2018, Valiant announced The Life and Death of Toyo Harada, a six-issue miniseries written by Joshua Dysart and drawn by CAFU that would be released sometime in 2019. On March 6, 2018, it was announced that Valiant's vice president of marketing & communications Hunter Gorinson had left the company.

On March 8, 2018, Valiant announced it had hired Karl Bollers as an editor. On March 22, 2018, Valiant announced it had hired Mel Caylo as Director of Marketing. On April 9, 2018, Valiant announced it had hired Joe Illidge as Executive Editor as of April 5, 2018. On April 16, 2018, Valiant's editor-in-chief Warren Simons announced that he had left the company. On April 17, Valiant announced it had promoted Robert Meyers from Managing Editor to editorial director.

On June 7, 2018, Valiant announced they would launch four new titles under the "Valiant Beyond" banner, with Faith: Dreamside, a limited series written by Jody Houser and drawn by MJ Kim, launching in September; Bloodshot Rising Spirit, an ongoing series written by Lonnie Nadler & Zac Thompson and drawn by Ken Lashley, launching in November; Livewire, a limited series written by Vita Ayala and drawn by Raúl Allén & Patricia Martín, launching in December; and Incursion, a limited series written by Andy Diggle and drawn by Doug Braithwaite, launching in February 2019.

On July 5, 2018, Valiant announced that comics retailer Matthew Klein had joined the company as its sales director after previously working at the company as a sales manager. On July 26, 2018, Valiant announced that comic industry veteran Lysa Hawkins had joined the company as an editor. On September 13, 2018, Valiant announced it had hired Emily Hecht as Sales & Social Media Manager. On October 3, 2018, Valiant announced it had promoted Karl Bollers to Senior Editor.

On October 24, 2018, Valiant announced it had hired former intern Oliver Taylor as International Licensing Coordinator. On October 31, 2018, Valiant announced it had promoted Julia Walchuk to Sales and Live Events Manager. On December 9, 2018, Valiant announced it had promoted Matthew Klein to Vice President of Sales and Marketing. On December 11, 2018, it was announced that Joe Illidge had left the company and that Robert Meyers had been promoted to Senior Editorial Director.

On December 12, 2018, Valiant announced its "Breakthrough" lineup of first issues launching in 2019. The four titles include the previously announced The Life and Death of Toyo Harada, written by Joshua Dysart and drawn by various artists launching in March; Punk Mambo, a five-issue limited series written by Cullen Bunn and drawn by Adam Gorham launching in April; Fallen World, a five-issue event series written by Dan Abnett and drawn by Adam Pollina featuring the character Rai launching in May; and Killers, written by B. Clay Moore and drawn by Fernando Dagnino launching in July. Two days later, the company announced it had hired Editorial intern Drew Baumgartner as Assistant Editor and Zane Warman as Domestic Licensing Coordinator.

On January 7, 2019, Valiant announced it had hired former JHU Comic Books manager Dani Ward as its sales manager. On January 9, 2019, Valiant announced it had hired former Marvel assistant editor Heather Antos as an editor. The following month Valiant announced an ongoing Psi Lords series written by Fred Van Lente and drawn by Renato Guedes that will launch in July 2019. This would be followed in subsequent months by announcements of new series. On March 14 Valiant announced a new Bloodshot ongoing series would launch in September 2019, written by Tim Seeley and drawn by Brett Booth. The series would launch with a one-shot written by Seeley which will be released on May 4, 2019, as part of Free Comic Book Day. The first three issues will be collected and released as a trade paperback in December to coincide with the release of the Bloodshot movie on February 21, 2020. On April 17 editor Heather Antos announced on Twitter that a new X-O Manowar ongoing series would launch in November 2019, written by Dennis Hopeless and drawn by Emilio Laiso. On July 11 it was announced that a four-issue Ninjak miniseries written by Cullen Bunn and drawn by Ramon F. Bachs would debut that October.

On July 30, 2019, Valiant announced it had hired Kat O'Neill as Live Events & Sales Manager. On August 13 Valiant announced a new Rai ongoing series would launch in November, written by Dan Abnett and drawn by Juan José Ryp. On September 17 Valiant announced a five-issue The Visitor mini-series would launch in December, written by Paul Levitz and drawn by M.J. Kim. Three days later, the company hired Legendary Comics Co-founder/Senior Editor Greg Tumbarello as Editor to develop new properties and advance existing IP.

On October 1, 2019, Valiant announced a new Quantum & Woody series would launch in January 2020, written by Chris Hastings and drawn by Ryan Browne. Two days later, the company revealed that the character Faith Herbert would be featured in a series of Young adult prose novels co-published with HarperCollins imprint Balzer + Bray. The first novel, FAITH: Taking Flight, written by author Julie Murphy, would be released in early 2020. On October 30 Valiant released a teaser image featuring the bird logo of Harbinger on a blue background, with the hashtag #Valiant2020 on the bottom.

On November 12, 2019, Valiant announced that a new version of Doctor Tomorrow would be debuting in a self-titled ongoing series that will launch in February 2020, written by Alejandro Arbona and drawn by Jim Towe. On November 18 Valiant announced that President of Consumer Products Russell Brown, who had been with the company since January 2013, had left in order to take up the position of Senior VP of Entertainment at Authentic Brands Group.

On March 11, 2020, Valiant announced that Heather Antos and Lysa Hawkins had been promoted to Senior Editors. That July, Valiant announced it had hired former Marvel and Top Cow editor David Wohl as a senior editor. On August 17, the company indicated that it would restructure the company, bringing its publishing, TV and film divisions closer together and moving its New York offices to another location within the city, with editor David Wohl working out of the Los Angeles offices of DMG Entertainment.

In August 2020, it was reported that Valiant, which had been one of the earliest comic book publishers to go into lockdown in response to the COVID-19 pandemic, had chosen to permanently close its Manhattan office, and have its employees work remotely.

By June 2023, Valiant Comics' output had slowed over the course of the preceding year to one monthly title, X-O Manowar Unconquered, with another title, Ninjak Superkillers, scheduled to debut later in the year. That month, the company announced a licensing partnership with Alien Books, which would see that publisher take over publication of Valiant comics, graphic novels and trade paperback collections.

==== Alien Books ====
Since 2024, Valiant announced a partnership wth Alien Books to publish the Resurgence of the Valiant Universe crossover event, followed by the Valiant Beyond initiative. In 2025 Alien Books partnered with IDW Publishing to sub-distribute Valiant Comics titles.

== Characters ==
The Valiant Universe, drawn by Bernard Chang, inked by Bob Layton, Tom Ryder and others

== In other media ==
=== Audio ===
In August 2014, Valiant partnered with Pendant Productions to produce audio dramas based on their comic books. The first of these, Archer & Armstrong: The Michelangelo Code, was released in 2016.

=== Film and television ===
In 2014, Valiant and Sean Daniel Company announced that they were collaborating to produce an Archer & Armstrong movie.

In March 2015, Valiant signed a partnership agreement with DMG Entertainment which included a nine-figure investment for film and TV adaptations of the Valiant characters. That May, Valiant announced a partnership with Sony Pictures to produce five films based on the Bloodshot and Harbinger comic books. The films would be set in a shared universe, which would be launched with Bloodshot, to be co-produced by Original Film, and culminate in a crossover film, Harbinger Wars. The rights for Harbinger would later be acquired from Sony by Paramount Pictures in 2019.

In March 2017, it was announced that Valiant was developing a Quantum and Woody TV show with the Russo Brothers. It was later announced the TBS was developing the series as a franchise. That June, it was reported that Reginald Huldin, Director of Marshall and former president of BET, was set to write and direct Valiant's Shadowman, while J. Michael Straczynski would executive produce.

In March 2018, it was announced that Vin Diesel would star as the title character in a Bloodshot feature film adaptation. The film was released on March 13, 2020, 31% rating on Rotten Tomatoes. That July, Sony Pictures announced it was developing a movie based on the Valiant character Faith Herbert, with Maria Melnik writing the screenplay. That December, it was announced that a Dr. Mirage drama was being developed by the CW network.

In November 2020, it was reported that a sequel to Bloodshot was in development with Vin Diesel to again play the title character.

=== Digital series ===
In 2015, the first Valiant Summit was broadcast from Twitter's San Francisco headquarters. The Valiant Summit 2016 was broadcast live on Twitch from New York City's UCB Theatre.

Season 2 of the game show Valiant Vanquished began streaming on Twitch in March 2017. It was based in the world of Catalyst Game Labs' Valiant Universe role playing game. The following month, the third Valiant Summit was broadcast on Twitch TV.

On April 21, 2018, Bat in the Sun Productions and Valiant Digital released the web series Ninjak vs. the Valiant Universe on ComicBook.com, featuring Michael Rowe as Ninjak.

=== Video games ===
Acclaim Entertainment produced numerous video games based on Valiant characters. The games were produced for various console and mobile platforms from PlayStation, Nintendo and Xbox. These games included Iron Man and X-O Manowar in Heavy Metal, Turok: Dinosaur Hunter, Turok: Battle of the Bionosaurs, Turok 2: Seeds of Evil, Shadow Man, Turok: Rage Wars, Armorines: Project S.W.A.R.M., Turok 3: Shadow of Oblivion, Shadow Man: 2econd Coming and Turok: Evolution.

In December 2019, Valiant announced a partnership with Blowfish Studios to create multiplatform video games featuring Valiant characters.

=== Consumer products ===
In 2012, Valiant announced a partnership with Rittenhouse Archives for collectable trading cards.

In 2013, Valiant partnered with the merchandising company Cinderblock partnered to produce apparel.

In March 2014, Valiant and Catalyst Game Labs announced a partnership for New Line of Comic Book-Based Tabletop Games. That May, Valiant partnered with Pendant Productions to produce audio dramas based on their comic books. The first of these, Archer & Armstrong: The Michelangelo Code, was released in 2016.

In 2015, Quarantine Studio launched a collectable Bloodshot statue.

in 2016, Pop! Vinyl debuted a figure of Faith "Zephyr" Herbert.

In February 2017, the Vans Warped Tour announced it was teaming with Valiant, which would provide all the artwork and branding for the tour's summer 2017 season. That September, Build-A-Bear produced a bear based on Valiant's Bloodshot character.

In 2019, McFarlane Toys introduced a Bloodshot action figure.

== Awards and recognition ==
- Valiant was named "Comic Book Publisher of the Year – Under 4%" by Diamond Comics Distributors in the Diamond GEM Awards in 2013.
- Valiant was named "Best Publisher" by Ambush Bug, Matt Adler and The Dean of Ain't It Cool News in Day One of the 9th Annual "AICN Comics @$$IE Awards" in 2013.
- Valiant was named "Best Publisher 2012" by Sheldon Lee of Comic Impact in the "Best of 2012" awards in 2013.
- Valiant was named "Best Publisher" of 2012 by Joel Rickenbach of Mania in "The Best Books of 2012" article in 2013.
- Valiant was named "Most Effective Relaunch (This Decade)" by the staff of ComicsAlliance in the "Best Comics of 2012" column in 2013.
- Valiant was voted number 1 in the "Which Comic Publisher's Output in 2013 Were You Most Thankful For?" poll on Comic Book Resources in 2014.
- Valiant was named "Item to Watch for 2014" by Rob McMonigal of Newsarama in "The Best of Best Shots 2013" column in 2013.
- Valiant was named "Best Publisher" by Optimous Douche and Ambush Bug of Ain't It Cool News in its 10th Annual AICN COMICS 10th Annual @$$IE Awards in 2014.
- In 2014, Valiant was nominated for 16 Harvey Awards, that recognize outstanding work in comics and sequential art.
- In 2015, Valiant led the Harvey Awards as the most nominated publisher with 20 nominations.
- In 2016, Valiant again led the Harvey Awards as the most nominated publisher with a total of 50 nominations.
- In August 2016, the one millionth copy of Valiant's X-O Manowar comics was enshrined in the Geppi's Entertainment Museum, the world's comics and pop culture hall of fame, located in Baltimore's historic Camden Yards complex.
