= Beverly Hills Bodysnatchers =

- Directed by: Jonathan Mostow
- Written by: P.K. Simonds; Jonathan Mostow
- Produced by: P.K. Simonds; Jonathan Mostow
- Starring: Vic Tayback; Frank Gorshin; Rodney Eastman; Warren Selko; Brooke Bundy; Seth Jaffe; Keone Young; Art Metrano
- Cinematography: Zoran Hochstätter
- Edited by: Barry Zetlin
- Music by: Arthur Barrow
- Production companies: Busybody Productions; Hess/Kallberg Productions; McGuffin Productions; Shapiro-Glickenhaus Entertainment
- Distributed by: Shapiro-Glickenhaus Entertainment; Starmaker Entertainment
- Release dates: May 17, 1989 (Cannes); October 11, 1989 (United States)
- Running time: 85 minutes
- Country: United States
- Language: English

Beverly Hills Bodysnatchers is a 1989 comedy film directed by Jonathan Mostow.

== Plot ==
A doctor and a mortician team up to do re-animation experiments on corpses using money borrowed from the mafia. When they can't pay it back, the mafia boss sends his nephews to work at the funeral home to keep a watch on the debtors. The nephews end up helping to search for new bodies, and mayhem ensues when some undesirable types are re-animated.

== Cast ==
- Vic Tayback as Lou
- Frank Gorshin as Doc
- Art Metrano as Vic
- Rodney Eastman as Freddy
- Warren Selko as Vincent
- Seth Jaffe as Don Carlo
- Brooke Bundy as Mona Darren
- Keone Young as Don Ho
- Christian Hoff as Stu
- Jonathan Mostow as Lab Technician
