= Jonathan Mostow =

American film director, screenwriter and producer

- Born: November 28, 1961 (age 64); Woodbridge, Connecticut, U.S.
- Occupations: Film director, screenwriter, producer
- Spouse: Laurie Sandell (m. 2018)
- Father: George Mostow

Jonathan Mostow (born November 28, 1961) is an American film director, screenwriter, and producer. He has directed films such as Breakdown (1997), U-571 (2000), Terminator 3: Rise of the Machines (2003), and Surrogates (2009).

== Early life ==
Mostow was born in Woodbridge, Connecticut. His father George Daniel Mostow was a mathematician, and his mother is a social worker. He graduated from Harvard University. He also trained at the American Repertory Company and the Lee Strasberg Institute. He grew up in a Conservative Jewish household.

== Career ==
In 1989, Mostow directed a direct-to-video horror comedy, Beverly Hills Bodysnatchers.

Mostow was originally attached to direct The Game (1997), with Kyle MacLachlan and Bridget Fonda for the lead roles. However, he ended up being an executive producer after David Fincher came on to direct. In 1997, he directed Breakdown, a thriller film starring Kurt Russell. Around the same time, he signed a deal with Universal Pictures. Both Mostow and Lieberman received a TV deal, via his Mostow/Lieberman Productions company to Studios USA.

In 2000, Mostow directed a World War II-era submarine film, U-571. He assembled a cast including Matthew McConaughey, Bill Paxton, Harvey Keitel, TC Carson, and Jon Bon Jovi. The film topped the U.S. box office chart.

In 2003, Mostow directed the third installment of the Terminator film series, Terminator 3: Rise of the Machines, which starred Arnold Schwarzenegger.

Mostow co-wrote a comic book series, The Megas, with John Harrison. Illustrated by Peter Rubin, it was published on Virgin Comics in 2008.

Mostow returned to direct another film, Surrogates, in 2009. Based on the comic book series, it starred Bruce Willis.

In 2017, Mostow directed The Hunter's Prayer, an action thriller film starring Sam Worthington.

== Personal life ==
On October 7, 2018, Mostow married writer Laurie Sandell. The two met through JDate in 2014.

== Filmography ==
=== Film ===
Year	Title	Director	Writer	Producer	Notes
1985	Fright Show	Yes	Yes	Yes	Segment "Dr. Dobermind"
1989	Beverly Hills Bodysnatchers	Yes	Story	Yes	Role: Cryonics Lab Technician; direct-to-video
1997	Breakdown	Yes	Yes	No	
2000	U-571	Yes	Yes	No	
2003	Terminator 3: Rise of the Machines	Yes	No	No	
2009	Surrogates	Yes	No	No	
2012	House at the End of the Street	No	Story	No	
2012	Playing for Keeps	No	No	Yes	
2017	The Hunter's Prayer	Yes	No	Yes	

Executive producer

- The Game (1997)
- Hancock (2008)
- The Hunter's Prayer (2017)

=== Television ===
Year(s)	Title	Director	Executive Producer	Notes
1998	From the Earth to the Moon	Yes	No	Episode "Le Voyage Dans La Lune"
2014–2015	The Last Ship	Yes	Yes	Episode "Phase Six"
2023-2024	Accused	Yes	No	Episode: "Danny's Story"

TV movies

Year(s)	Title	Director	Executive Producer	Writer
1991	Flight of Black Angel	Yes	No	Story
2007	Them	Yes	Yes	No
