= Steven Massarsky =

American lawyer and businessman

Steven J. Massarsky (Mar 21, 1948 – October 5, 2007) was an American lawyer and businessman who founded Voyager Communications, parent company of the early 1990s comic book company Valiant Comics.

== Biography ==
Born in New Jersey, Massarsky graduated from Weehawken High School in 1966 and was inducted into the school's hall of fame in 1999. He held an A.B. in political science from Brown University and a J.D. from Rutgers School of Law–Newark. He was a founding board member of the Brown University Entrepreneurship Program. He was also member of the Weehawken, New Jersey Hall of Fame.

Massarsky first owned and operated an artist management company handling artists such as The Allman Brothers Band and The Wailers, and is responsible for launching the career of Cyndi Lauper. He next operated an entertainment law practice with such diverse clients as Nintendo, The Wailers, Cabbage Patch Dolls, the Psychedelic Furs, Collins Management, Aerosmith, Tom Chapin and Willie Mays.

Massarsky next co-founded Voyager Communications in 1989, with Valiant Comics growing into the third largest comic book publisher in the United States behind only Marvel Comics and DC Comics during the comic boom of the 1990s. The company was later sold to Acclaim Entertainment, with Massarsky remaining on as president and Publisher of the resulting Acclaim Comics.

He died from complications of cancer on October 5, 2007, aged 59.
