= Robert Venditti =

American comic book writer

- Venditti at GalaxyCon Des Moines in 2026
- Born: Hollywood, Florida, U.S.
- Area: Writer
- Notable works: The Surrogates; The Homeland Directive; Green Lantern; The Flash; X-O Manowar; Justice League; Hawkman

Robert Venditti is an American comic book writer, known for his work on the Top Shelf Productions title The Surrogates, which was adapted to a major motion picture starring Bruce Willis directed by Jonathan Mostow for Disney., and for the Valiant Comics title X-O Manowar. He is also known for his work on DC Comics titles such as The Flash, Green Lantern, Justice League, and Hawkman. He has also adapted the Percy Jackson & the Olympians and The Heroes of Olympus book series by Rick Riordan into graphic novels.

== Early life ==
Robert Venditti was born and raised in Hollywood, Florida, and Pembroke Pines, Florida. Though he says he always wanted to be a prose writer, he rarely read comics as a child, but would peruse the comics at the barber shop.

He later moved to Gainesville to attend the University of Florida where he received a B.A. in Political Science and English. After college he worked as a clerk at a law firm in southern Florida with aspirations to practice law, but found that work not to his liking. After subsequently worked pumping gas on a fuel truck, he moved to the Port St. John/Titusville area in Brevard County to which his parents had moved, where he attended the University of Central Florida, working at a Borders Books store in Winter Park, while earning his M.A. in Creative Writing. In about 2000, while working at Borders, a coworker recommended comics books as reading material to him. Though the skeptical Venditti initially thought of comics as solely for children, his reading of Kurt Busiek's Astro City impressed him enough to decide to change his career aspirations from prose to comics.

== Career ==
In 2002 Venditti attended a convention and met Chris Staros from Top Shelf Productions, and was added to Staros' email list. That April, Staros subsequently sent out a mass email announcing that Top Shelf's distributor was going bankrupt, and asking recipients of the email to place orders to aid the distributor. Venditti contacted Staros to offer help, and ending up doing warehouse work for him. Venditti began working on The Surrogates in July 2002, and after finishing the script that December, he gave it to Staros, who decided to publish it through Top Shelf, despite the fact that it was not typical of the material they usually published. The first issue of the five-issue miniseries was published in July 2005, and the fifth in March 2006. The prequel Surrogates: Flesh & Bone, was released in September 2009, the same month as the release of the feature film adaptation of the first miniseries, starring Bruce Willis.

In May 2012 Venditti began writing the X-O Manowar series for Valiant Entertainment. Venditti began his first work for DC Comics when he took over from Paul Cornell on Demon Knights beginning with issue #16, and took over Green Lantern and Green Lantern Corps in June 2013.

== Personal life ==
As of 2008, Venditti lives in Atlanta, Georgia.

== Bibliography ==
=== Top Shelf Productions ===
- The Surrogates #1-5 (limited series, July 2005-April 2006)
  - The Surrogates (tpb, 208 pages, 2006, ISBN 1-891830-87-2) collects:
    - "Chapter One: Field Test" (with Brett Weldele, in #1, 2005)
    - "Chapter Two: Life Unfiltered" (with Brett Weldele, in #2, 2005)
    - "Chapter Three: Revelations" (with Brett Weldele, in #3, 2005)
    - "Chapter Four: Biologics" (with Brett Weldele, in #4, 2006)
    - "Chapter Five: Pulse" (with Brett Weldele, in #5, 2006)
- The Surrogates: Flesh and Bone (graphic novel, with Brett Weldele, tpb, 144 pages, July 2009, ISBN 1-603090-18-5)
- The Homeland Directive (graphic novel with Mike Huddleston, June 2011, tpb, 144 pages, ISBN 1-603090-24-X)
- The Surrogates: Case Files #1-2 (with Brett Weldele, July–September 2012)

=== Valiant Entertainment ===
- 4001 A.D.: X-O Manowar #1 (2016)
- Armor Hunters #1-4 (2014)
- Armor Hunters: Aftermath #1 (2014)
- Book of Death #1-4 (2015)
- Book of Death: The Fall of X-O Manowar #1 (2015)
- Eternal Warrior: Awakening #1 (2017)
- Wrath of the Eternal Warrior #1-14 (2015-2016)
- X-O Manowar vol. 3 #0-50, Annual 2016 (2012-2016)
- X-O Manowar: Commander Trill #0 (2015)
- X-O Manowar: Valiant 25th Anniversary Special #1 (2015)

=== DC Comics ===
- Damage vol. 2 #1-16, Annual #1 (2018-2019)
- Demon Knights #16-23 (2013)
- The Flash vol. 4 #30-49, Annual #3 (2014-2016)
- The Flash: Futures End #1 (2014)
- Freedom Fighters vol. 3 #1-12 (2019-2020)
- Future State: Green Lantern #2 (2021)
- Generations: Forged #1 (2021)
- Generations: Shattered #1 (2021)
- Green Lantern vol. 5 #21-52, 23.1, Annual #2-4 (2013-2016)
- Green Lantern 80th Anniversary 100-Page Super Spectacular #1 (2020)
- Green Lantern: Futures End #1 (2014)
- Green Lantern Corps vol. 3 #21-27, Annual #2 (2013-2014)
- Hal Jordan and the Green Lantern Corps #1-50 (2016-2018)
- Hal Jordan and the Green Lantern Corps: Rebirth #1 (2016)
- Hawkman vol. 5 #1-29 (2018-2020)
- Justice League vol. 3 #32 (2018)
- Justice League vol. 4 #40-47, Annual #2 (2020)
- New Gods: Godhead #1 (2014)
- Secret Origins vol. 3 #3, 7 (2014)
- Supergirl vol. 7 Annual #2 (2020)
- Wesley Dodds: The Sandman vol. 1 #1-6 (2023-2024)

=== Other publishers ===
- Marvel Comics Presents vol. 2 #6, "4F" (with Jeremy Haun, February 2008, Marvel Comics)
- Iron Man: Iron Protocols, one-shot, "The Ark" (with Mark Nelson, October 2009) collected in Iron Man: Tales Of The Golden Avenger (tpb, 128 pages, 2010, ISBN 0-78514-279-7, Marvel Comics)
- Percy Jackson & the Olympians, Disney-Hyperion:
  - "Percy Jackson & the Olympians: The Lightning Thief" (graphic novel, with Attila Futaki, October 2010, tpb, 128 pages, ISBN 1-42311-710-7)
  - "Percy Jackson & the Olympians: The Sea of Monsters" (graphic novel, with Attila Futaki, July 2013, tpb, 128 pages, ISBN 1-42314-550-X)
  - "Percy Jackson & the Olympians: The Titan's Curse" (graphic novel, with Attila Futaki, October 2013, tpb, 128 pages, ISBN 1-42314-551-8)
- Blue Bloods (graphic novel with Alina Urusov, January 2013, hc, 112 pages, ISBN 1-42313-446-X, HarperCollins)
- The Heroes of Olympus, Disney-Hyperion:
  - "The Lost Hero: The Graphic Novel" (graphic novel, with Nate Powell, October 2014, hc, 192 pages, ISBN 1-42316-279-X)
  - "The Son of Neptune: The Graphic Novel" (graphic novel, with Antoine Dodé, February 2017, hc, 192 pages, ISBN 1-48472-303-1)
- Miles Taylor and the Golden Cape: Attack of the Alien Horde (book, illustrated by Dusty Higgins, June 2015, hc, 304 pages, ISBN 1-48140-542-X, Simon & Schuster)
- Miles Taylor and the Golden Cape: Rise of the Robot Army (book, illustrated by Dusty Higgins, June 2016, hc, 304 pages, ISBN 1-48140-557-8, Simon & Schuster)
