= Doctor Tomorrow =

Publication information
- Publisher: Acclaim Comics; Valiant Comics
- First appearance: Operation: Stormbreaker #1 (August 1997)
- Created by: Mark Waid; Brian Augustyn

In-story information
- Alter ego: Bart Simms
- Abilities: Agility; Intellect; Stamina; Time Travel; Unarmed Combat

Doctor Tomorrow (Bart Simms) is a superhero appearing in books published by the American publisher Valiant Comics. The character was created by Mark Waid and Brian Augustyn.

== Fictional character biography (Acclaim Comics) ==
When Bart Simms discovered a capsule from the future that contained a fully loaded Angel Computer, he used the knowledge contained therein to become the hero known as Doctor Tomorrow.

Though initially Bart enjoyed playing the role of hero, eventually the gift from the future became a curse. From then on, Bart strived to stop the capsule from going back in time in an effort to change his own destiny, unaware that he was playing a role in someone else's plan.

== Sources ==
- Bart Simms (Doctor Tomorrow) at Valiant Entertainment
