= Surrogates =

2009 American science fiction action film by Jonathan Mostow

- Theatrical release poster
- Directed by: Jonathan Mostow
- Screenplay by: John Brancato; Michael Ferris
- Based on: The Surrogates by Robert Venditti
- Produced by: David Hoberman; Todd Lieberman
- Starring: Bruce Willis; Radha Mitchell; Rosamund Pike; Boris Kodjoe; James Cromwell; Ving Rhames
- Cinematography: Oliver Wood
- Edited by: Kevin Stitt
- Music by: Richard Marvin
- Production companies: Touchstone Pictures; Mandeville Films; Brownstone Productions
- Distributed by: Walt Disney Studios Motion Pictures
- Release dates: September 24, 2009 (El Capitan Theatre); September 25, 2009 (U.S.)
- Running time: 89 minutes
- Country: United States
- Language: English
- Budget: $80 million
- Box office: $122.4 million

Surrogates is a 2009 American science fiction action film directed by Jonathan Mostow, from a screenplay by John Brancato and Michael Ferris, based on the 2005–2006 Top Shelf comic book series The Surrogates by Robert Venditti. It stars Bruce Willis as Tom Greer, an FBI agent who ventures out into the real world to investigate the murder of surrogates (humanoid remote-controlled robots). It also stars Radha Mitchell, Rosamund Pike, Boris Kodjoe, James Cromwell and Ving Rhames.

The film's main concept centers on the mysterious murder of a college student linked to the man who helped create a high-tech surrogate phenomenon that allows people to purchase remote-controlled humanoid robots through which they interact with society. These fit, attractive, remotely controlled robots ultimately assume their life roles, enabling people to experience life vicariously from the comfort and safety of their own homes.

Surrogates was released on September 25, 2009, in the United States and Canada. It received mixed reviews from critics and was a box-office disappointment grossing over $122 million on an $80 million budget.

== Plot ==
In 2054, widespread use of remotely controlled androids called "surrogates" enables people to operate an idealized body (a more youthful version of their own, or a wholly different one) from the safety of their homes, becoming slovenly and housebound as a consequence. Protected from harm, a surrogate's operator can indulge in risky behaviour, and they can make their surrogate perform acrobatics beyond human capability. In Boston, FBI agent Tom Greer has been estranged from his wife Maggie since their son's death in a car crash several years before. He never sees her outside of her surrogate and she criticizes his desire to interact via their real bodies.

Tom and his partner, Agent Jennifer Peters, investigate the death of two people who were killed when their surrogates were destroyed at a Fort Point club. Jared Canter, one of the victims, is the son of Dr. Lionel Canter, the inventor of surrogates and the former head of their manufacturing company, Virtual Self Industries (VSI). The two determine that a human, Miles Strickland, used a new type of weapon to overload the surrogates' systems and kill their operators.

After locating Strickland, Tom attempts to bring him into custody. Strickland uses the weapon, killing six police officers and the pilot of Tom's helicopter, and injures Tom during the chase; Tom inadvertently crash-lands into an anti-surrogate zone known as the Dread Reservation (one of many throughout the US). A mob helps Strickland and destroys Tom's surrogate. The Dread leader, a man known as the Prophet, kills Strickland and confiscates the weapon.

With his surrogate destroyed, Tom is forced to interact in the world without one. He learns that VSI originally produced the weapon, designed to load a virus that overloads a surrogate's systems, thus disabling it, under a government contract. Unexpectedly, the weapon also disabled the fail-safe protocols protecting operators. The project was promptly scrapped and all prototypes supposedly destroyed.

Tom also learns that Andrew Stone, his FBI superior, supplied the weapon to Strickland and ordered Dr. Canter's assassination, upon VSI's request, for his criticism of surrogate use. Jared, who had, unbeknownst to the assassin, been using one of his father's many surrogates, was killed instead. An unknown man murders Jennifer in her home and then hijacks her surrogate, and the Prophet orders the weapon delivered to her. During a military raid on the reservation, the Prophet is shot, revealing he was actually a surrogate, with audience learning that Canter himself was its operator. Tom steals the code that activates the weapon from Stone, but "Jennifer" escapes with the codes.

Immediately travelling to Canter's home, Tom discovers that Canter has been controlling not only the Prophet, but also Jennifer and the surrogate he used to kill Jennifer as well. Using Jennifer's surrogate in FBI Headquarters, Canter uses the weapon to kill Stone. Considering all surrogate users irredeemable, he proceeds to upload the virus to all surrogates, which will destroy them and kill their operators. Canter reveals that he only wanted to empower the disabled to live normal lives, but after he was fired from VSI, they capitalized on surrogacy for profit.

Convinced his plan is unstoppable, Canter disconnects from Jennifer's surrogate and swallows a cyanide pill. Tom takes control of Jennifer's surrogate and, with the assistance of the network's system administrator, Bobby Saunders, insulates the virus so the operators will survive, but a second step is required to save the surrogates. After a moment of consideration, Tom chooses to let the virus permanently disable surrogates worldwide. With all the surrogates disabled, people emerge from their homes, confused and afraid.

Returning home, Tom shares an emotional embrace with Maggie in her real form. The film ends with an aerial view of the collapsed surrogates along with overlapping news reports of downed surrogates all over the world and how people are now "on their own" again.

== Cast ==
- Bruce Willis as Tom Greer, an FBI agent investigating the mysterious murder of a college student linked to the high-tech surrogate phenomenon.
- Radha Mitchell as Jennifer Peters, Greer's FBI partner.
- Rosamund Pike as Maggie Greer, Greer's wife.
- Boris Kodjoe as Andrew Stone, Peters' and Greer's supervisor at the FBI.
- James Francis Ginty as Canter, a surrogate that belonged to Lionel Canter's son.
- James Cromwell as Older Canter, the reclusive inventor of the surrogates.
- Ving Rhames as The Prophet, a human cult figure who disdains surrogates who is actually secretly a surrogate of Dr. Canter.
- Jack Noseworthy as Miles Strickland, a man hired to kill Lionel Canter.
- Devin Ratray as Bobby Saunders, the administrator of the FBI computer system that controls the surrogate network.
- Michael Cudlitz as Colonel Brendon, an Army colonel in charge of using surrogates in warfare.
- Helena Mattsson as JJ the Blonde, a blonde female surrogate for Cameron McAllister.
- Ella Thomas as Lisa, female surrogate who is a friend of Maggie Greer.
- Shane Dzicek as Jarod Canter, Dr. Lionel Canter's son who is murdered by a human assassin.
- Cody Christian as Boy Canter, an alternate surrogate that belongs to Lionel Canter.
- Trevor Donovan as Surrie/Greer, a temporary replacement surrogate that Peters convinces Greer to try out.

== Production ==
In March 2007, Disney acquired feature film rights to the 2005–2006 comic book series The Surrogates with the intent to distribute under Touchstone Pictures. The project was conceived by Max Handelman and Elizabeth Banks through Brownstone Productions, and they enlisted producer Todd Lieberman to move it forward. Under Disney, Jonathan Mostow was attached to direct the film based on an adapted screenplay by Michael Ferris and John Brancato. The following November, Bruce Willis was cast to star in the lead role.

Filming was scheduled to begin in February 2008 in Lynn, Massachusetts. It was delayed, beginning on April 29, 2008, in Woburn. Filming then took place in the Massachusetts cities of Lynn, Worcester, Milford, Hopedale, Taunton, Lawrence and Wayland.

Visual effects were handled by Sandbox FX, Brickyard VFX, Industrial Light and Magic and Moving Picture Company.

== Music ==
Surrogates: Original Motion Picture Soundtrack

Soundtrack album by Richard Marvin
- Released: November 23, 2009
- Recorded: 2009
- Studios: The Newman Scoring Stage, Twentieth Century Fox; Sony Pictures Scoring Stage
- Genres: Film score; Soundtrack album
- Length: 41:06
- Label: Lakeshore
- Producer: Richard Marvin

Professional ratings
Review scores
Source	Rating
AllMusic	3/5 stars
Filmtracks	3/5 stars
iTunes	3/5 stars
Movie Music UK	3/5 stars
Tracksounds	3/5 stars

Surrogates: Original Motion Picture Soundtrack was orchestrated by composer Richard Marvin. Surrogates is the fifth film on which director Jonathan Mostow and composer Richard Marvin have collaborated. Marvin recorded his score with the 120-piece Hollywood Studio Symphony. Although it was not featured in the soundtrack, the song "I Will Not Bow," performed by Breaking Benjamin, was played during the film's ending credits and the song's music video features footage from the film. The soundtrack was released on November 23, 2009.

Track listing

All music is composed by Richard Marvin.

No.	Title	Length
1.	"Pix Title Sequence"	3:14
2.	"Drive to Club"	1:39
3.	"Cam's Apartment/Greer's Apartment"	4:06
4.	"Warrant Received/Foot Chase"	6:20
5.	"Urine Abomination"	0:57
6.	"Prophet Lies/Greer Rides"	1:29
7.	"I Want You"	2:03
8.	"Operation Prophet"	1:49
9.	"Stone's Headache"	3:01
10.	"T-Bone/Stone Zapped"	5:41
11.	"Shift Enter"	5:26
12.	"Aftermath"	5:21
Total length:		41:06

== Release ==
=== Theatrical ===
Surrogates hosted its world premiere at the El Capitan Theatre in Hollywood, California on September 24, 2009. It was released the next day in North American cinemas by Touchstone Pictures to lukewarm reviews from film critics.

=== Rating ===
The Motion Picture Association of America gave the film a PG-13 rating for "intense sequences of violence, disturbing images, language, sexuality and a drug-related scene."

=== Home media ===
The DVD and Blu-ray were released in January 2010. The Blu-ray version features four deleted scenes, a commentary by director Jonathan Mostow, 2 featurettes, and an "I Will Not Bow" music video by Breaking Benjamin. The movie has sold 713,851 units, which gives it a total gross of $12,052,466 in DVD sales.

== Reception ==
=== Box office ===
Surrogates played at 2,992 theaters. On its opening weekend, it grossed to $14,902,692, averaging $5,050 per theater, ranking #2 at the U.S. box office, behind Cloudy with a Chance of Meatballs. For the second weekend of Oct 2–4, it saw a 45% decrease where it dropped down to 4th place at the box office only to gross $7,241,054. The third domestic weekend release saw a 36% decrease, which was 9% less than its last weekend. The film went on to gross $38,577,772 domestically and $83,867,000 internationally, giving it a worldwide gross of $122,444,772.

=== Critical response ===
Surrogates was not pre-screened for critics. As of June 2020, the review aggregator Rotten Tomatoes reported an approval rating of 37%, based on 115 reviews, and an average rating of 5.33/10. The website's critical consensus reads, "Though it sports a slick look and feel, Surrogates fails to capitalize on a promising premise, relying instead on mindless action and a poor script". Metacritic gave the film an average score of 45 out of 100 based on 21 critic reviews, indicating "mixed or average reviews". Audiences polled by CinemaScore gave the film an average grade of "C" on an A+ to F scale.

IGN gave the film a 6.0/10, saying that "it provides a competently made, relatively predictable and slickly presented piece of genre entertainment, offering just the right amount of action beats and futuristic visuals to keep the viewer engaged without ever having an actual thought. It's good, escapist fun". Yahoo! Movies gave it a grade "C+" based on 10 reviews.

Entertainment Weekly's Lisa Schwarzbaum concluded her positive review saying that "there's fun robot stuff, some good philosophical ideas, and a brief, nutty Willis–Ving Rhames reunion 15 years after Pulp Fiction". Roger Ebert of the Chicago Sun-Times gave the film 2½ stars out of 4. Ebert wrote that "while more ambitious than it has to be, the film descends into action scenes too quickly. ... Surrogates is entertaining and ingenious, but it settles too soon for formula." He also says, "The concept, based on a graphic novel by Robert Venditti and Brett Weldele, would lead naturally to intriguing considerations."

Some critics were less positive: Claudia Puig of USA Today called it "a poor substitute of sci-fi thriller saying that the tone of the movie is rarely satirical and that it's more concerned with political intrigue involving pockets of anti-surrogate protesters that enjoy bludgeoning the machines." Roger Moore of the Orlando Sentinel gave it a negative review, writing "watchable, but obvious... Surrogates never manages to be anything more than a poor substitute for the real thing."

Jordan Hoffman of UGO Entertainment gave Surrogates a B+ rating, saying it is intellectually stimulating enough to keep you intrigued while never forgetting its obligation as B movie fun. Todd McCarthy of Variety described it as an intense and eerily plausible science fiction thriller.

Some critics remarked that the plot has some similarities to David Brin's Kiln People.

== See also ==
- Brain–computer interface
- First-person perspective
- Simulation
- Telepresence
- Teleoperation
- Virtual reality
