= Sean and Chris =

- Sean and Chris at age 18. Art by Abdul H. Rashid.

Publication information
- Publisher: Marvel Comics
- First appearance: NEW-GEN #1 (May 2010)
- Created by: J.D. Matonti; Chris Matonti; Julia Coppola

In-story information
- Alter ego: Sean Daniels; Chris Daniels
- Species: Human
- Abilities: Able to glimpse images of events taking place at other points in the time-space continuum

Sean and Chris Daniels are a pair of characters that appear in the NEW-GEN comic books published by Marvel Comics. Created by Chris Matonti, J.D. Matonti, and Julia Coppola, they first appeared in NEW-GEN #1 (2010). They are the twin sons of Gabriel and Thea, but were raised on Earth by foster parents.

== Fictional character biography ==
=== Sent to Earth ===
Sean and Chris were born on the world of New-Gen, the twin sons of Gabriel, leading scientist in the field of nanotechnology, and his wife Thea. They were mere infants when Gabriel's apprentice, Sylvester Deadalus, betrayed his mentor and released an enormous swarm of nanobots onto the populace. These nanobots were capable of mutating the bodies of those they infected, giving them superpowers and enhanced abilities. Gabriel and Deadalus fought brutally, but Gabriel eventually triumphed and banished Deadalus to the underworld as punishment. As a precaution, to protect them from Deadalus should he ever resurface, Gabriel sent his sons to live and be raised in present-day New York City on Earth. Before he sent them there, Gabriel expressed concern that their bodies had also been affected by Deadalus' nanobot infestation, although they showed no outward signs of this being the case.

=== Growing Up ===
The twins were raised by adoptive parents, experiencing a fairly normal childhood in the city. They got themselves into fights on more than one occasion over the course of their school years, usually instigated by Sean. They consistently felt out of place in school and had few true, close friends. Back on New-Gen, Gabriel and Thea observed the twins as they grew older and matured. The decision to send them to Earth is a source of constant conflict between the couple, even prompting Thea to leave Gabriel for a brief time.

=== Visions of the Battle ===
As they got older, Sean began having nightmares about a man they didn't recognize, which Chris dismisses as merely bad dreams. Unbeknownst to them, the dreams were actually visions and the man was Deadalus as he transformed into the demonic Sly through the use of the microbots he found in the underworld. When Sly eventually dug his way out of the underworld, onto Zadaar III, Sean began having waking visions of the battle taking place there between Sly and the members of the A.P.N.G. (Mini, Flyer, Gazelle, Diamond, and Roboduck). As the visions became more and more fitful, Chris brought Sean home, and their adoptive parents exchange worried looks, saying that the twins' "time has come." Gabriel takes this to mean that Deadalus' nanobots have, in fact, infected his sons and that their powers are beginning to manifest themselves.

== Powers, abilities, and equipment ==
The twins, having been infants on New-Gen when Deadalus' swarm infected the population, have latent, dormant powers, the full extent of which has not yet been revealed. Gabriel acknowledges the likelihood of them having powers before he even sends them to Earth. Sean's powers begin to manifest themselves when he begins having dreams and visions about events at various other points in the time-space continuum.

Sean also seems to be a tenacious brawler, on occasion overpowering a bully nearly twice his size. Chris, although similarly built, prefers to solve his problems rationally.
