= The Megas =

Comics series

The Megas #1 Art by Peter Rubin

The Megas is a five-issue mini-series from Virgin Comics and film director Jonathan Mostow.

== Credits ==
The Megas was created by Jonathan Mostow, and is written by John Harrison, with art by Peter Rubin and color by S. Periaswamy. The story is by Mostow and Harrison.

== Plot ==
The Megas explores an alternative history scenario in which the founding fathers of the United States established another aristocracy rather than a democracy. The eponymous Megas are the elite members of the American Royalty, a benevolent but dictatorial ruling class. Now, in the 21st Century, the Megas have ruled America for over 200 years. Mostow described the story for Variety:

The story "revolves around Detective Jack Madison and his race-against-the-clock investigation to uncover secrets behind the mysterious sex-fueled suicide of a Prince in The Megas royal family. Meanwhile, the King is on his deathbed at The White Palace (yes, at 1600 Pennsylvania Avenue!), and society is bracing for the inevitable chaos that will surely ensue once he dies.

== Publication ==
The first issue debuted on February 27, 2008.

== Film adaptation ==
In 2008, a film adaptation was said to be in development with Mostow attached to direct, though the project was never produced.
