= Aquaman: The Becoming =

- Cover of Aquaman: The Becoming #1.

Publication information
- Publisher: DC Comics
- Schedule: Monthly
- Format: limited series
- Publication date: September 2021 — February 2022
- No. of issues: 6

Creative team
- Written by: Brandon Thomas

Aquaman: The Becoming is a six-issue comic book miniseries that was published by DC Comics from September 2021 to February 2022.

== Synopsis ==
The series follows Aqualad, who is accused of blowing up Aquaman's training facility and must prove his innocence.

== Issues ==
| Number | Publication date | Comic Book Roundup rating | Estimated sales (first month) |
|---|---|---|---|
| #1 | September 21, 2021 | 8.7 by 14 professional critics. | 24,000, ranked 124th in North America |
| #2 | October 26, 2021 | 9 by 10 professional critics. | 14,500, ranked 142nd in North America |
| #3 | November 16, 2021 | 8.3 by 8 professional critics. | — |
| #4 | December 28, 2021 | 7.9 by 10 professional critics. | — |
| #5 | January 18, 2022 | 7.7 by 5 professional critics. | — |
| #6 | February 15, 2022 | 8.3 by 9 professional critics. | — |

== Reception ==
Henry Varona from Comic Book Resources called last issue a "satisfying end to Jackson Hyde's first solo series". Reviewer from Bleeding Cool gave first issue 7.5 rating and wrote "a strong setting and some epic performances by supporting characters establish a great foundation for a new generation of stories".

=== Awards ===
| Year | Award | Category | Result |
|---|---|---|---|
| 2022 | GLAAD Media Awards | Outstanding Comic Book | Nominated |
