= The Surrogates =

Science fiction comic book limited series

- Cover of 2009 collected edition of The Surrogates

Publication information
- Publisher: Top Shelf Productions
- Schedule: Monthly
- Format: Limited series Graphic novel
- Genre: Science fiction
- Publication date: The Surrogates; July 2005 - March 2006; The Surrogates: Flesh and Bone; July 2009
- No. of issues: 5

Creative team
- Created by: Robert Venditti; Brett Weldele
- Written by: Robert Venditti
- Artist: Brett Weldele
- Colorist: Brett Weldele
- Editor: Chris Staros

Collected editions
- The Surrogates: ISBN 1-891830-87-2
- The Surrogates: Flesh and Bone: ISBN 1603090185
- The Surrogates Operator's Manual: ISBN 1603090452

The Surrogates is a five-issue comic book limited series written by Robert Venditti, drawn by Brett Weldele, and published by Top Shelf Productions from 2005 to 2006. In 2009 it was followed by a prequel graphic novel, The Surrogates: Flesh and Bone.

It has been made into a film, Surrogates, starring Bruce Willis.

== Publication history ==
The first series ran from 2005 to 2006, with a collected edition published in July 2006 (ISBN 1891830872). A prequel graphic novel, The Surrogates: Flesh and Bone, was published in July 2009 (ISBN 1603090185). A limited edition hardcover, The Surrogates Operator's Manual, collects both books into a single volume (ISBN 1603090452).

Venditti was inspired to write The Surrogates after reading Indra Sinha's book The Cybergypsies, about numerous individuals who lost their spouses or their jobs due to their addiction to the internet and their online personas. In an interview, he said: "It dawned on me that if you were somehow able to create a persona and send it out into the real world—where it could go to work for you, and run your errands, and so on—then you would never have to go back to being yourself."

== Plot summary ==
=== The Surrogates ===
In the year 2054, people use surrogates (humanoid remote control vehicles) as a form of telepresence in their daily lives and interactions with one another. In Central Georgia Metropolis, Lt. Harvey Greer investigates the destruction of two surrogates. Greer soon discovers a mysterious figure (whom he nicknames "Steeplejack") plotting to permanently disable all surrogates in an effort to eliminate people's dependence on them. Greer considers the anti-surrogate religious leader named "The Prophet" a suspect, but The Prophet is later killed by Steeplejack. Similar to Steeplejack and The Prophet, Greer feels people have become too reliant on surrogates for superficial reasons. Greer chooses to work the investigation in-person after Steeplejack destroys Greer's surrogate. Greer later discovers Steeplejack himself is a surrogate controlled by Lionel Canter, the inventor of the original surrogate. Lionel designed surrogates as a tool for the physically impaired and became dissatisfied with their widespread personal use by the non-impaired. Eventually Lionel/Steeplejack successfully disables surrogates throughout the city. Greer later discovers his wife Margaret, a surrogate-addict, has committed suicide because her attractive-looking surrogate was disabled.

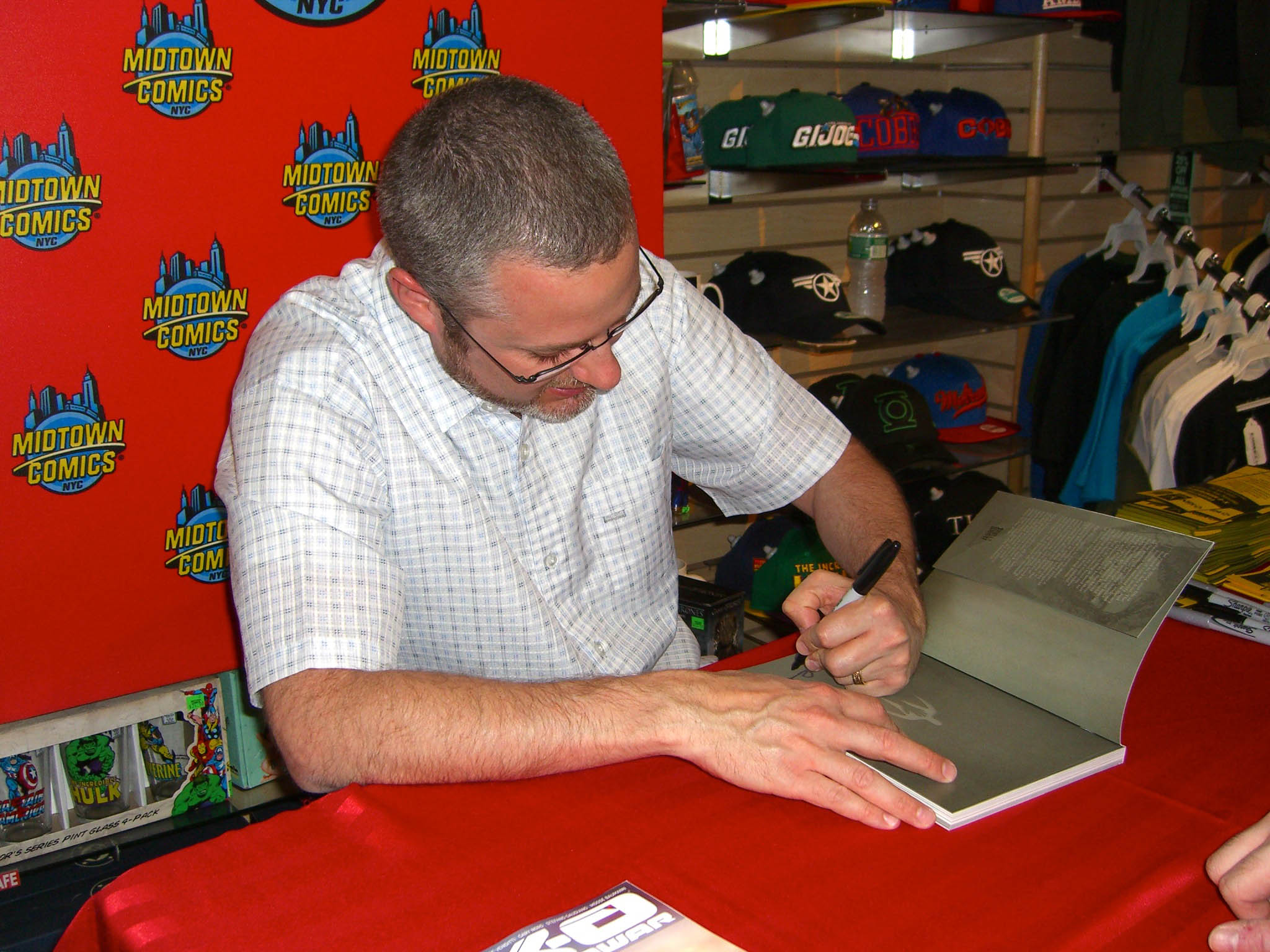
Writer Robert Venditti signing a copy of The Surrogates Operator's Manual, which collects both miniseries, at Midtown Comics in Manhattan

=== The Surrogates: Flesh and Bone ===
Flesh and Bone is set fifteen years before the original Surrogates story. It explores the early days of surrogate availability, including riots that take place in the wake of a surrogate-related murder. Harvey Greer is a patrolman investigating the beating death of a homeless person by a teenage boy who uses his father's surrogate without permission. The father's lawyer claims the father operated the surrogate in self-defense. The police reluctantly drop the charges after their witness is murdered by an assassin. Thousands of members of a religious group riot for several days, protesting the dropped charges and the growing popularity of surrogates. The mayor meets with the group's leader "The Prophet" and negotiates an end to the riots by giving the group a large parcel of land to establish a reservation. Greer is promoted to detective after his investigation leads to the teenage boy's involvement in the beating death of the homeless man. The lawyer is charged (framed) with plotting the witness' murder, although the murder was actually orchestrated by The Prophet.

== Critical reception ==
Although it received good reviews, the initial miniseries debuted with low sales numbers. The second issue sold less than 2000 copies and was the 295th best selling comic in October 2005. The book attracted more attention after the film adaptation was announced.

== Film adaptation ==
The Surrogates was made into a film, Surrogates. The film is directed by Jonathan Mostow and stars Bruce Willis. Disney bought the film rights in 2007, and filming began in April 2008 in Boston. Surrogates was released on September 25, 2009 under the Touchstone Pictures banner.
