= Laurie Sandell =

American author (born 1971)

- Born: 1971 (age 54–55)
- Occupation: writer
- Spouse: Jonathan Mostow

Laurie Sandell (born 1971) is an American author. She has been a working journalist for over a decade before she published the first of her two books.

Her first book is a graphic memoir entitled The Impostor's Daughter: A True Memoir, that describes how, as she grew older, she realized her father was a fabulist, and stories she had taken at face value simply weren't credible.

She started her second book, Truth and Consequences: Life Inside the Madoff Family, after Catherine Hooper, the fiancée of Bernie Madoff's son Andrew Madoff, introduced herself at a book signing. They became friends, and she asked her publisher to help Hooper prepare a book on disaster planning. Her publisher, instead, encouraged her to write a profile of the family.

In a review in The Telegraph Helen Brown wrote that when she started read Truth and Consequences she was prepared to be sympathetic to Bernie Madoff's family, but she just couldn't do it. She decided she was less credulous than Sandell and thought Sandell's description of the Madoffs made them sound shallow and unlikeable. Jessica Grose, writing in Slate magazine, described how Sandell's book, and joining Sandell on her book tour, helped the public find sympathy for Ruth Madoff.

Deadline Hollywood reported that Zambry films acquired the movie rights to The Impostor's Daughter, in December 2012.

In 2013 Sandell wrote an essay, for The New York Times, entitled "How to Break Up With A 2-Year-Old." In the essay she described first her surprise at falling in love with the toddler of a man she was dating, and then her feeling of loss as she realized how much she would miss that child, as her relationship with her father deteriorated. She described how meeting that girl triggered her to bear a child through artificial insemination, or to adopt a child, if that failed. Busy Philipps read her essay aloud for a series broadcast on WBUR in 2018.

Sandell's book on the Madoff family was credited as a source for the 2017 movie Wizard of Lies.

On October 7, 2018, The New York Times reported she married Jonathan Mostow. The two met through JDate in 2014, after she began dating again, after the birth of her son. He was the first man she dated after becoming a mother, and she has written Mostow is a wonderful father to her son and his own four children.
