= Visionbooks =

Animation comics company

Visionbooks is an animation comics company.

== Visionbooks ==
Visionborne, through its department Visionbooks, originated the medium of animated comics, which are comic books read on a digital device that include motion graphics within the frames, delivered via a mobile application. Initial publishers to release comics through Visionbooks included Asylum Press, Arcana Studio, Real Interface Studios, Vanquish Interactive, and Cavalletto. Mike Splechta said of the motion that, “each panel in the comic will have some slight movement or motion ... adding a sort of kinetic feel to each scene. It's certainly not fully animated, that's what TV shows are for after all, but now you you'll get a better sense of the action, like when a hero fl[ies] up into the air, or someone slices off the head of a zombie.” The app is a free download, with several titles released per month. In 2014 Visionbooks formed a partnership with Valiant Entertainment to distribute its animated comics as well.
