= Intuit (Ramona Falls album) =

Studio album by Ramona Falls
- Released: August 18, 2009
- Genre: Indie rock
- Label: Barsuk
- Producer: Brent Knopf

Intuit is the debut studio album by Ramona Falls, the moniker of Brent Knopf, better known for being one third of the band Menomena. It was released on August 18, 2009, on Barsuk Records.

It was written and performed by Knopf, with guest appearances by 35 friends (including members of The Helio Sequence, Mirah, Loch Lomond, 31 Knots, Talkdemonic, Tracker, Dat'r, Dear Reader, 3 Leg Torso, and Matt Sheehy). The cover was illustrated by Theo Ellsworth.

== Reception ==
Professional ratings
Review scores
Source	Rating
Alternative Press	(September 2009, p. 108)
The A.V. Club	(B−) link
Cokemachineglow	(75%) link
Pitchfork	link
Spin Magazine	link
Under The Radar	link

Eric Hill of Exclaim! observed "songs that combine the Menomena brand of hooks-a-plenty" with "traces of OMD, Modern English and even Howard Jones".

== Track listing ==
1. Melectric – 4:16
2. I Say Fever - 4:27
3. Clover - 5:22
4. Russia - 3:14
5. Going Once, Going Twice - 5:41
6. Salt Sack - 3:55
7. Boy Ant - 0:52
8. Always Right - 4:53
9. The Darkest Day - 4:12
10. Bellyfulla - 3:36
11. Diamond Shovel - 3:29

== Recording Process ==
Knopf recorded and mixed the album in both Portland and New York City, using places like The Whimsy Room, The Organ House, The Knitting Factory, Mouse Forest Studio, alongside churches, friends homes and practice rooms. In an interview with Come On Chemicals, Knopf stated about the process:

The intensive recording started in January, that’s when I got really serious about it, and I set out to record about 13 songs and I ended up finishing these 11 songs. I collaborated with a whole bunch of friends, and with each person, I would go over to their space, their home or church or practice room or whatever, and would record with them for about two and a half hours. So, I’d set up, and then for the first half, they would play along with whatever I had prepared, and then for the 2nd half of the time, I had pre-designed ideas that I was hoping to ask them to implement or interpret, or I’d have a beat in mind or a melody in mind. And so that was the collaborative part of it, but the rest of it was pretty much just me trying to conspire against my own procrastinating and perfectionist tendencies to try to make actual progress.

The result on record was a truly collaborative effort, where each individual would bring their own interpretation. "The whole idea for asking people to come up with ideas is to try and create a space for happy accidents, and then to have those takes be amongst the takes to choose from when assembling composite tracks. So I'd say probably 20 percent was stuff that they had improvised, and 80 percent was stuff I knew I wanted, but they would often play off each other in ways I didn't predict, so that was pretty cool. But for the most part I had a vision, I had a preconceived notion of what I wanted, but I also wanted to create a space for freedom, for some improvisation and some mistakes, because often in mistakes is where the best ideas are."

== Personnel ==
- Brent Knopf - recording and mixing (tracks 1–10)
- Jeff Stuart Saltzman - recording and mixing (track 11)
- Alan Douches - mastering
