= Return to the Moon =

Studio album by EL VY
- Released: October 30, 2015
- Recorded: Winter 2014–spring 2015
- Genre: Indie rock; indie pop; post-punk revival
- Length: 41:38
- Language: English
- Label: 4AD
- Producer: Brent Knopf

Singles from Return to the Moon
- 1. "Return to the Moon (Political Song for Didi Bloome to Sing, with Crescendo)" Released: August 5, 2015; 2. "I'm the Man to Be" Released: September 3, 2015; 3. "Paul Is Alive" Released: October 7, 2015; 4. "Need a Friend" Released: October 27, 2015; 5. "Silent Ivy Hotel" Released: October 29, 2015

Return to the Moon is the debut studio album by American indie rock band EL VY, released on October 30, 2015, on 4AD. A collaboration between Matt Berninger (singer for The National) and Brent Knopf (Ramona Falls, Menomena), the two musicians had befriended one another on tour and exchanged sketches of music and lyrics for years, before getting together in the winter of 2014 to formally record an album.

== Reception ==
Professional ratings
Aggregate scores
Source	Rating
Metacritic	73/100
Review scores
Source	Rating
AllMusic	3.5/5 stars
The A.V. Club	A
The Guardian	4/5 stars
The Irish Times	4/5 stars
NME	4/5 stars
Pitchfork	4.8/10
Rolling Stone	3.5/5 stars

Return to the Moon was met with a largely favorable reception from music critics. On Metacritic, the album has a weighted average score of 73 out of 100 based on 25 reviews, indicating "generally favorable reviews".

Josh Modell of The A.V. Club praised Return to the Moon as "one of the best albums of 2015" and proclaimed that "it stands shoulder to miserable, brilliant shoulder" next to Berninger's work with The National. In his 4 out of 5 star review for NME, Rob Cooke drew comparisons to Knopf's former band, Menomena, writing that "fans of the brilliantly inventive art-rock band...will find lots to love in "Paul Is Alive"'s sparse, springy synths, the claustrophobic crunch of "Sad Case" and the brittle post-punk of "Happiness, Missouri"." Critics were divided by the recontextualization of Berninger's songwriting and vocals with Knopf's keyboard-heavy arrangements - while Rolling Stone expressed that "Matt Berninger has never sounded more like himself", Pitchfork labeled the project "muddled and confused, unsure of a clear direction to take."

=== Accolades ===
Publication	Accolade	Rank	Ref.
Drowned in Sound	Drowned in Sound's Favourite Albums of the Year 2015	87	
Gigwise	Gigwise's Albums of the Year 2015	34	
The Line of Best Fit	The Fifty Best Albums of 2015	—	
Muzikalia	The Best International Albums of 2015	21	
The Skinny	The 50 Best Albums of 2015	46	
Under the Radar	Under the Radar's Top 100 Albums of 2015	10	

== Track listing ==
All songs written by Matt Berninger and Brent Knopf; additional lyrics written by Carin Besser.

No.	Title	Length
1.	"Return to the Moon (Political Song for Didi Bloome to Sing, with Crescendo)"	4:13
2.	"I'm the Man to Be"	4:34
3.	"Paul Is Alive"	3:31
4.	"Need a Friend"	3:21
5.	"Silent Ivy Hotel"	4:11
6.	"No Time to Crank the Sun"	5:13
7.	"It's a Game"	4:05
8.	"Sleepin' Light (featuring Ural Thomas)"	3:43
9.	"Sad Case"	3:30
10.	"Happiness, MO"	2:02
11.	"Careless"	3:22

== Personnel ==
EL VY

- Matt Berninger
- Brent Knopf
- Matt Sheehy - touring member
- Andy Stack - touring member

Additional musicians

- Drew Shoals - drums (tracks 1, 2, 4, 5, 6, 9, 10, 11)
- John O'Reilly Jr. - drums (tracks 2, 3, 7, 8)
- Lauren Jacobson - violin
- Ural Thomas, Moorea Masa, Allison Hall, and Margaret Wehr - backing vocals

Production

- Brent Knopf - production, engineering
- Craig Silvey - mixing
- Greg Calbi - mastering
- Jeff Stuart Saltzman - drum engineering
- Tim Shrout - drum engineering and editing assistance
- Sean O'Brien - vocal engineering
- Eduardo de la Paz - mixing assistance
- Zach Stamler - editing assistance
- Matt Sheehy - editing assistance

Artwork

- Deirdre O'Callaghan - photography
- John Solimine - logo design
- Alison Fielding - packaging layout

== Charts ==
=== Weekly charts ===
Chart (2015)	Peak position
Belgian Albums (Ultratop Flanders)	6
Belgian Albums (Ultratop Wallonia)	106
Canadian Albums (Billboard)	53
Dutch Albums (Album Top 100)	34
French Albums (SNEP)	154
Irish Albums (IRMA)	7
New Zealand Albums (RMNZ)	35
Portuguese Albums (AFP)	24
Scottish Albums (OCC)	39
UK Albums (OCC)	43
US Billboard 200	66
US Top Alternative Albums (Billboard)	6
US Independent Albums (Billboard)	7
US Top Rock Albums (Billboard)	8
US Indie Store Album Sales (Billboard)	12

=== Year-end charts ===
Chart (2015)	Position
Belgian Albums (Ultratop Flanders)	166
