= Dear Reader (band) =

South African alternative pop act

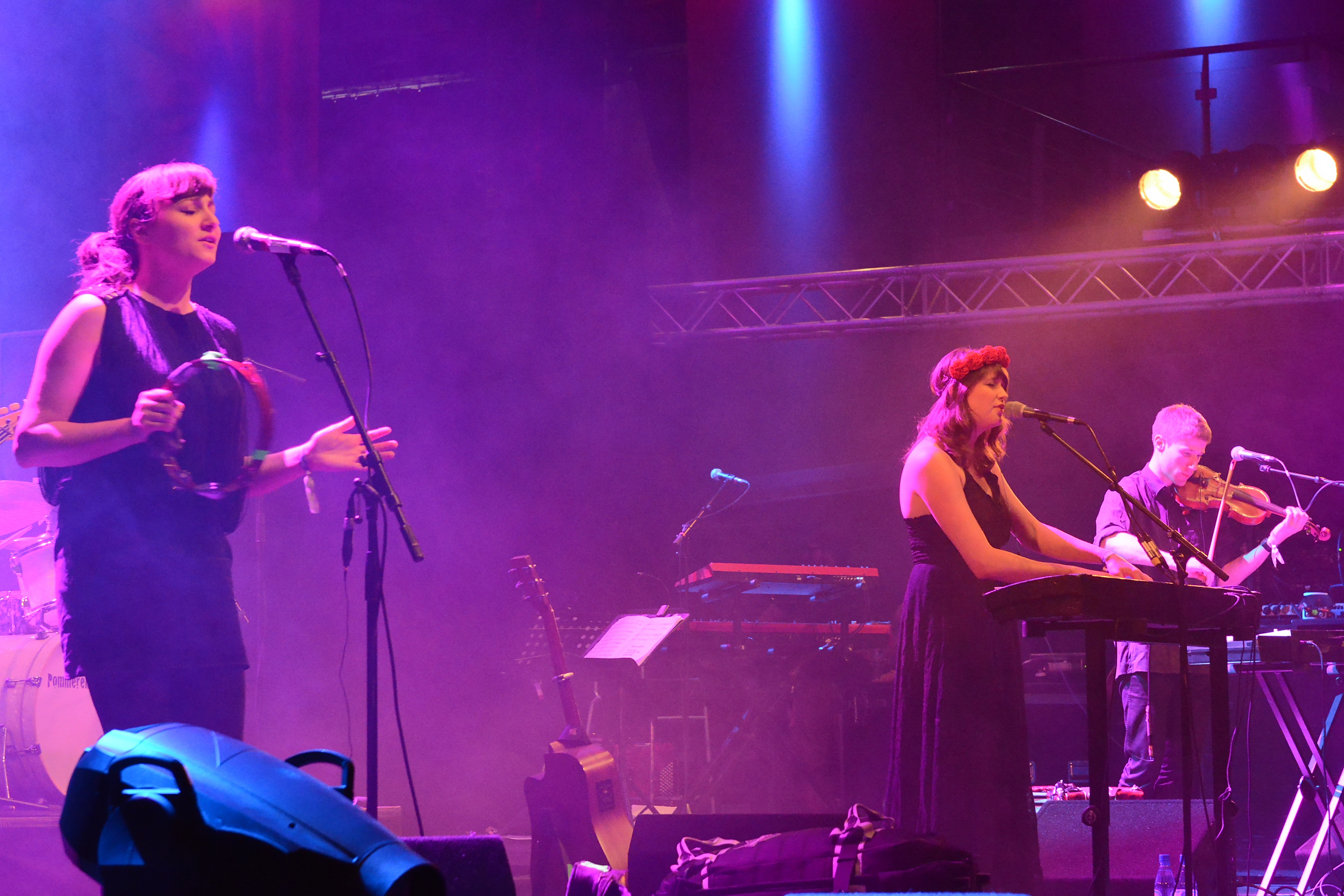
- Dear Reader at Traumzeit-Festival 2014

Background information
- Origin: Johannesburg, South Africa
- Genre: Alternative pop
- Years active: 2008–present
- Label: City Slang
- Members: Cherilyn MacNeil
- Past members: Darryl Torr
- Website: DearReaderMusic.com

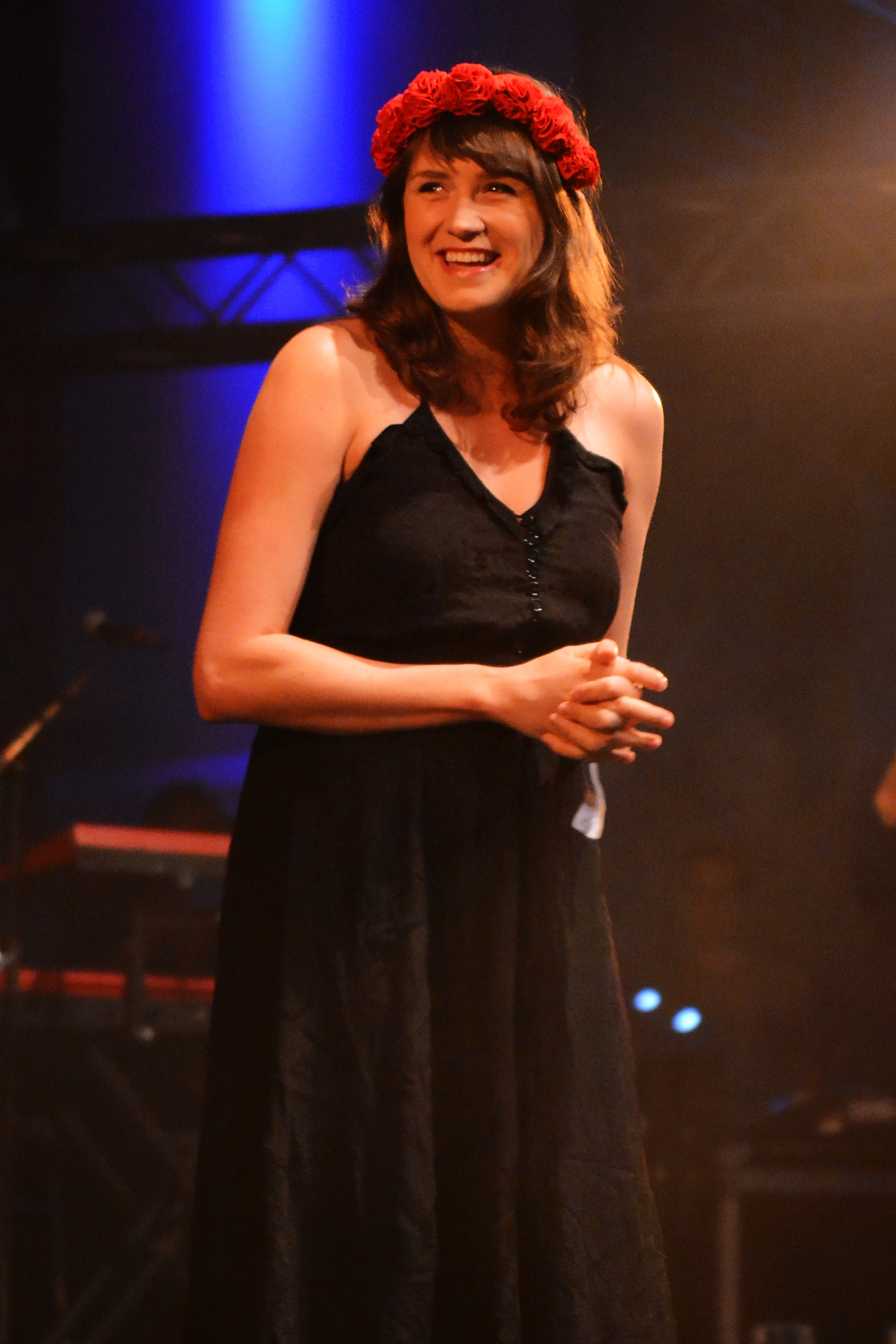
Cherilyn MacNeil 2014

Dear Reader is an alternative/pop band from Johannesburg, South Africa. The band was founded in 2008 by singer-songwriter Cherilyn MacNeil and producer/bass player, Darryl Torr. Dear Reader is now the solo project of Cherilyn MacNeil and is based in Berlin, Germany.

== History ==
Prior to 2008, MacNeil and Torr performed under the name Harris Tweed. Under this name the band had commercial success and won awards in South Africa. The duo changed their name to Dear Reader after receiving legal threats from the Harris Tweed Authority.

In 2008 they recorded their first album as Dear Reader called, Replace Why with Funny. The album was produced by Brent Knopf, of Menomena and Ramona Falls. Soon after, they signed a licensing deal with Berlin-based indie label, City Slang, and the album was released in February 2009 – in Europe by City Slang, and in South Africa by Just Music.

In 2010 'Replace Why with Funny' won the award for Best English Adult contemporary Album at the South African Music Awards.

In 2010 MacNeil and Torr amicably parted ways and Cherilyn relocated to Berlin, where she wrote the material for the follow-up Dear Reader album, Idealistic Animals. The album was recorded in Leipzig, Germany and Portland, Oregon, again with the assistance of Brent Knopf and various other friends and musicians.

Idealistic Animals was released in Germany and South Africa in September 2011 and in Europe and the UK in November 2011. The album was nominated for Best Alternative Album at the 2012 South African Music Awards.

In 2012 MacNeil began work on the follow up to 'Idealistic Animals'. This time, MacNeil produced the album herself, and recorded and edited most of it in her one-room apartment in Berlin. MacNeil enlisted Eli Crews to mix the record, and called the fourth Dear Reader album, Rivonia, after the suburb in Johannesburg where she grew up. Each song on the album is a story inspired by South African history. The album was released in Europe and South Africa in April 2013, and was nominated for two South African Music Awards in 2014.

In April 2013 Dear Reader played a live radio concert with the Babelsberg Film Orchestra, which they recorded and released in December 2013 as a live album with the name 'We Followed Every Sound'.

In February 2016 MacNeil travelled to San Francisco to record a new album with John Vanderslice at his studio, Tiny Telephone. The album was recorded entirely on tape over a two-week period with local musicians from the Bay area, and was produced and mixed by Vanderslice. MacNeil gave the album the title Day Fever and the album was released through City Slang worldwide on 24 February 2017.

== Collaborators ==
=== Guest Appearances on the album Day Fever ===
Horns - Adam Theis Clarinet - Ben Goldburg Cello - Nate Blaz Drums - Jason Slota Percussion - Andrew Maguire Bass and horn arrangements - James Riotto Backing Vocals – Sami Perez, Madeline Kenney, Carly Bond, Inés Beltranena, Lindy Groening, Erika Wilson and Rebecca Edwards

=== Guest Appearances on the album Rivonia ===
Earl Harvin on drums, percussion & bass Samuel Vance-Law on violin & vocals Martin Wenk on the horns Friedrich Brückner on bassoon Bernd & Isabel Brückner on clarinet, saxophone & flute Giovanni Nicoletta on bass Erik Sunbring on electric guitar & vocals

Vocals by Konstantin Gropper, Caoimhe McAlister, Emma Greenfield, Deniz Jaspersen, Sven van Thom & Laurent Martin

Choir: Friederike Scharlau, Daniel Ziesche, Joachim Berger, Tabea Köbler, Franz Prante, Jonas Wehner, Katja Rößler, Franziska Schmidt, Matthias Simmler, Jonas Wehner, Michael Schiedt, Doreen Seifert, Friedrich Brückner, Lerato Maleka, Teresa Schulz and Carina Ulbricht.

=== Guest Appearances on the album Idealistic Animals ===
Brent Knopf, Jean-Louise Nel, Martin Wenk (of Calexico), Jacob Lind, Erik Sunbring, Caoimhe McAlister, Fritz, Bernt and Isabel Brückner, Matt Sheehy, Dave Depper, Mark Shirazi, Sven Michelson, John Askew, Jessica Beer, Christopher Cotter, Jen Dolan, Tamara Harris, Bennet Baily, Thom Fahrbach.

=== Current Touring Members of Dear Reader ===
Evelyn Saylor, Stellan Veloce, Olga Nosova

=== Previous Live members ===
Darryl Torr, Michael Wright, Martin Wenk, Jacob Lind, Erik Sunbring, Samuel Vance-Law, Emma Greenfield, Thomas Fietz, Michael Vinne, Jean-Louise Nel, Alexander Parker

== Discography ==
=== Studio albums ===
- Replace Why with Funny (2009)
- Idealistic Animals (2011)
- Rivonia (2013)
- Day Fever (2017)

=== Live albums ===
- We Followed Every Sound (2013)

== Reviews ==
- http://www.lasvegascritics.com/reviews/dear-reader-replace-why-with-funny.html
- https://web.archive.org/web/20120330053900/http://www.thelineofbestfit.com/2009/05/dear-reader-replace-why-with-funny/
- http://www.musikexpress.de/reviews/alben/article114586/dear-reader.html
- http://www.incendiarymag.com/brightsparks/dearreader/dear_reader_idealistic_animals
