= I Am the Fun Blame Monster! =

Studio album by Menomena
- Released: May 20, 2003 (Self release) & October 23, 2003 (Through FILMguerrero)
- Recorded: 2003 Hot Water Bottle in Cornelius, Oregon
- Genre: Experimental; psychedelic pop; experimental pop; instrumental rock
- Length: 44:26
- Label: Barsuk; Muuuhahaha!; FILMguerrero Fg25
- Producer: Menomena

Menomena chronology
I Am the Fun Blame Monster! (2003)	Under an Hour (2005)

Professional ratings
Aggregate scores
Source	Rating
Metacritic	82/100
Review scores
Source	Rating
AllMusic	3.5/5 stars
Pitchfork	8.7/10
PopMatters	8/10
Stylus Magazine	B+
Tiny Mix Tapes	5/5 stars

I Am the Fun Blame Monster! is the debut studio album from Portland-based experimental pop/rock group Menomena. It was self-released on May 20, 2003 and made available exclusively through online retailer CD Baby. The CD was re-released by FILMguerrero in 2004, and then again by Barsuk/FILMguerrero in 2007. A white vinyl LP was released by FILMguerrero in 2005 that featured an origami design by band member Brent Knopf and hand screen printing/assembly by band member Danny Seim. The original run was limited to 500 copies, which sold out. FILMguerrero re-released the LP in 2007 on 180 gram vinyl, but without the intricate packaging. The title is an anagram for "The First Menomena Album."

On May 24, 2011, the album was reissued as a double album alongside a bonus DVD. The bonus material features 9 bonus tracks and rare footage of the band's appearances on Portland cable public-access television program The Sista Social Show, a live performance at Portland's Meow-Meow and music videos for the album tracks "Trigga Hiccups" and "Cough Coughing".

== Track listing ==
1. "Cough Coughing" – 3:20
2. "The Late Great Libido" – 4:59
3. "E. Is Stable" – 5:17
4. "Twenty Cell Revolt" – 4:05
5. "Strongest Man in the World" – 5:35
6. "Oahu" – 5:18
7. "Trigga Hiccups" – 4:02
8. "Rose" – 2:58
9. "The Monkey's Back" – 8:52

=== Deluxe reissue ===
1. "Shirt"
2. "Crunka"
3. "Let's All Unite!"
4. "The Ladder"
5. "Sepia"
6. "Nebali"
7. "Divad"
8. "Tung Track"
9. "Posh Isolation"

== Accolades ==
Publication	List	Rank	Ref.
Pitchfork	Top 50 Albums of 2003	32	

== Personnel ==
Menomena

- Brent Knopf - leading vocals, multi-instrumentalist
- Justin Harris - bass guitar, guitar
- Danny Seim - drums
