= My Haunted =

Studio album by Lackthereof
- Released: 2008
- Recorded: 2007
- Genre: home recording, lo-fi
- Length: 33:47
- Label: FILMguerrero

Lackthereof chronology
Christian the Christian (2004)	My Haunted (2008)	Your Anchor (2008)

My Haunted is the eighth album by Lackthereof, a solo project of Danny Seim, a founding member and drummer of Menomena. It was released in spring 2008 by FILMguerrero, the second release of Lackthereof on the label.

== Reception ==
Pitchfork's Joe Tangari states "the compositional approach is more conventional, with little-to-no involvement of crazy computer programs. The basic palette is acoustic guitar, vocals, and reverb, with Seim frequently layering his voice or slipping in a bit of percussion." and "If a Menomena album feels like Seim coming over for a visit with his fellow band members, My Haunted is a little more like a postcard sent from far away-- a few thoughts strung together to form a nice but not quite satisfying reminder of a friendship."

== Track listing ==
1. "It's Over" – 2:40
2. "Away, Away" – 3:46
3. "Every Kind Word" – 1:42
4. "Fate" – 1:51
5. "Gong Song" – 1:51
6. "Holywater" – 1:21
7. "Both of Us" – 5:21
8. "Jaw" – 2:49
9. "Blazing Lights" – 1:35
10. "Century" – 2:21
11. "The Columbia" – 3:37
12. "Shortest Path to the Ground" – 2:07
13. "Wooden Spine" – 2:46
