= EL VY =

American indie rock duo

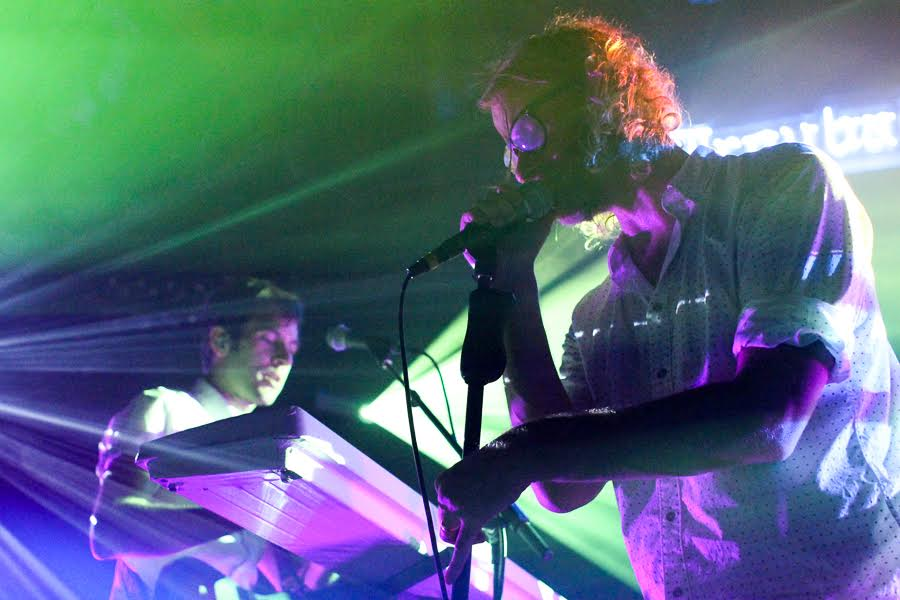
- EL VY in concert

Background information
- Genre: Indie rock
- Years active: 2015–present
- Label: 4AD
- Members: Matt Berninger; Brent Knopf
- Website: www.elvy.co

EL VY is an American indie rock duo that consists of Matt Berninger (lead vocalist of The National) and Brent Knopf (founding member of Ramona Falls and Menomena). The duo released their debut album, Return to the Moon, in October 2015.

== History ==
Berninger and Knopf met when The National and Menomena shared a bill in Portland, Oregon on October 24, 2003, at Holocene. The two became friends and kept in touch, periodically playing gigs together in subsequent years.

EL VY released its debut studio album, Return to the Moon, in October 2015, which Berninger, inspired by both Grease and We Jam Econo, imagined "as a sort of punk rock musical following the adventures of Didi and Michael—named after the Minutemen's D. Boon and Mike Watt." EL VY tours as a four-piece, with Matt Sheehy on bass guitar and Andy Stack on drums.

On January 11, 2016, following the death of David Bowie, EL VY performed a cover of Bowie's "Let's Dance" on The Late Show with Stephen Colbert, collaborating with Colbert's house band, Jon Batiste & Stay Human.

In October 2016, EL VY contributed a song and videogame to Dave Eggers' 30 Days, 50 Songs project, entitled "Are These My Jets".

== Members ==
Official Members

- Matt Berninger – lead vocals, lyrics
- Brent Knopf – music composition, production, keys, guitars, synths, programming

Touring Members

- Andy Stack (of Wye Oak) – drums
- Matt Sheehy (of Lost Lander) – bass guitar

== Collaborators ==
During the recording of Return to the Moon, EL VY collaborated with several artists, including drummers Drew Shoals (of Train) and John O'Reilly Jr (fun. and others), violinist Lauren Jacobson (The Lumineers and others), and background vocalists Ural Thomas, Moorea Masa, Allison Hall, and Margaret Wehr. A unique art card was created by John Solimine for each song on the album. Return to the Moon was mastered by Greg Calbi at Sterling Sound, mixed by Craig Silvey at Toast (assisted by Eduardo de la Paz). EL VY later enlisted Andrew Joslyn for strings on "Are These My Jets".

== Discography ==
=== Studio albums ===
List of studio albums, with selected chart positions
Title	Details	Peak chart positions									
Title	Details	US	BEL (FL)	BEL (WA)	CAN	FRA	IRL	NLD	NZ	SCO	UK
Return to the Moon	Released: October 30, 2015; Label: 4AD	66	6	106	53	154	7	34	35	39	43

=== Singles ===
List of singles, with selected chart positions, showing year released and album name
Title	Year	Peak chart positions					Album
Title	Year	US AAA	US Alt	US Rock Air	BEL (FL)	CAN Rock	Album
"Return to the Moon (Political Song for Didi Blume to Sing, with Crescendo)"	2015	6	28	31	53	49	Return to the Moon
"Need a Friend"	2015	—	—	—	119	—	Return to the Moon
"Are These My Jets"	2016	—	—	—	—	—	Non-album single
"—" denotes a recording that did not chart or was not released in that territory.
