= Empty Pools =

- Origin: Bristol, England, UK
- Genres: post punk, noise pop, art rock
- Years active: 2011–present
- Label: Battle Worldwide Recordings
- Members: Aaron Dewey; Ben Shillabeer; Matt Wilson; Leah Pritchard
- Website: emptypools.co.uk soundcloud.com/emptypools battleworldwiderecordings.com/battle/artists/empty-pools/

Empty Pools is an English indie rock band from Bristol, England.

== History ==
The band was formed in 2011 by Ben Shillabeer and Aaron Dewey, who had previously played together in John Parish's band at the turn of the millennium. They self-released two singles in 2012, which gained them attention from the NME, before signing to Battle Worldwide Recordings (Frenchkiss Label Group) and releasing two 7" singles in 2012 and 2013.

The band has opened for Sharon Van Etten, Menomena, White Denim, Destroyer, Other Lives and Tom Tom Club, and played a UK tour with Eleanor Friedberger and members of Field Music in August/September 2013. Their debut album, Saturn Reruns, was announced via SPIN for a 4 November release. It was preceded by the Exploded View EP on 26 August, which featured remixes by Menomena and Thought Forms, and the Slack Tide EP on 28 October, the lead track from which received airplay from Gideon Coe on BBC 6 Music and a video premiere on The Guardian.

The band were featured in the 9th episode of Minha Loja de Discos which aired on Brazilian TV channel Bis, focusing on Bristol musicians and labels such as Portishead, Anika, Massive Attack and Tricky. Saturn Reruns received an 8/10 review from the NME, who called it "a devastatingly accomplished debut".

== Discography ==
=== Albums ===
- Saturn Reruns (2013)

=== EPs ===
- Slack Tide (2013)
- Exploded View (2013)

=== Singles ===
- "Small Talk" / "Televised" (2013)
- "Safety School" / "Absentees" (2012)
- "Exploded View" (2012)
- "Vanderbilt Cup" (2012)
