= Prophet (Ramona Falls album) =

Studio album by Ramona Falls
- Released: 2012
- Genre: Indie Rock

Prophet is the second album by Ramona Falls, the moniker of Brent Knopf, better known for being one third of the band Menomena.

The album was rated a 6.5 out of 10 by Pitchfork.

== Track listing ==
1. Bodies of Water
2. The Space Between Lightning And Thunder
3. Spore
4. Divide by Zero
5. Archimedes Plutonium
6. Sqworm
7. Fingerhold
8. If I Equals U
9. Brevony
10. Proof
11. Helium
12. Miracle Cure
13. Bveloed
