= F&F =

F&F may refer to:

== Film and television ==
- Fox & Friends, American daily news/talk program on Fox News Channel
- Fox & Friends First, an early breakfast television news program on Fox News Channel
- Fast and Furious (1939 film), a mystery comedy film directed by Busby Berkeley
- Friends & Family (film), a 2001 gay- and mafia-themed comedy film

== Other uses ==
- F&F Tower, office tower in Panama City, Panama
- Fresh and Fit Podcast, male self-improvement podcast hosted by Myron Gaines and Walter Weekes
- Friend and Foe, the third studio album by the Portland, Oregon-based band Menomena
- F&F (Tesco), a clothes brand by retailer Tesco
