= Moms (album) =

Studio album by Menomena
- Released: September 18, 2012
- Genre: Experimental pop; rock
- Length: 50:09
- Label: Barsuk

Menomena chronology
Mines (2010)	Moms (2012)

Moms is the fifth studio album from the band Menomena. It was released on September 18, 2012.

== Background ==
Following the release of their 2010 album Mines, member Brent Knopf left the group to focus on solo project Ramona Falls. Remaining members Danny Seim and Justin Harris continued on as a two-piece. Seim and Harris planned their next album to deal with the topic of mothers; Seim's mother had died when he was young, and Harris was raised largely by a single mother.

Compared to the process of recording Mines, which was "gruelling" according to Seim, the Moms sessions were "our most collaborative and peaceful".

== Reception ==
The album received generally favorable reviews in music publications. On Metacritic, it received an 81/100 based on 23 reviews indicating "universal acclaim". Pitchfork Media gave the album an eight out of ten rating and commented that the album was "the most aggressive record Menomena have ever made". AllMusic felt the maternal theme was a "unifying" element and appreciated the album's "emotional depth". The album peaked at #150 on the Billboard 200 chart and at #32 on the Independent Albums chart.

Professional ratings
Aggregate scores
Source	Rating
Metacritic	81/100
Review scores
Source	Rating
AllMusic	4/5 stars
The A.V. Club	B+
Consequence of Sound	4/5 stars
DIY	4/5 stars
Mojo	4/5 stars
NME	8/10
Now	4/5 stars
Pitchfork	8.0/10
Slant Magazine	4/5 stars
Under the Radar	8.5/10

== Track listing ==
All tracks are written by Menomena.

No.	Title	Length
1.	"Plumage"	4:12
2.	"Capsule"	4:04
3.	"Pique"	4:35
4.	"Baton"	3:12
5.	"Heavy Is As Heavy Does"	4:28
6.	"Giftshoppe"	5:02
7.	"Skintercourse"	4:00
8.	"Tantalus"	4:46
9.	"Don’t Mess With Latexas"	5:35
10.	"One Horse"	10:11
Total length:		50:09

== Personnel ==
Menomena

- Justin Harris
- Danny Seim
