= Ramona Falls (band) =

American indie rock band

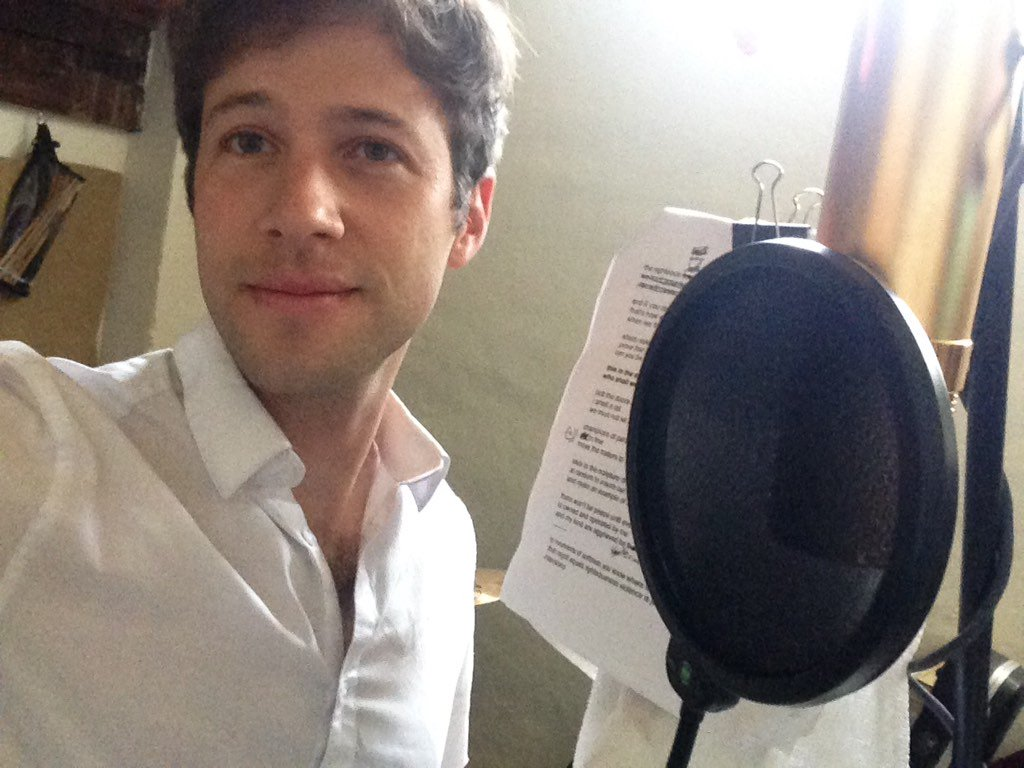
- Brent Knopf of Ramona Falls recording vocals in 2016

Background information
- Origin: Portland, Oregon, United States
- Genre: Indie rock Neofolk
- Years active: 2009–present
- Labels: Barsuk Records; Souterrain Transmissions
- Members: Brent Knopf
- Past members: Matt Sheehy, Dave Lowensohn, Paul Alcott
- Website: RamonaFalls.com

Ramona Falls is an indie rock project founded by Brent Knopf and based in Portland, Oregon. The band name is taken from a waterfall located near Mount Hood, a place where Knopf used to hike as a child. Brent Knopf co-founded Menomena before departing in 2011, and is also one-half of EL VY, a collaboration with The National's Matt Berninger.

== History ==
Ramona Falls took shape after Menomena's recording process for their third album was delayed. Knopf embarked on the project with songs that were not used for Menomena.

Brent played a handful of his own material at shows around Portland, Oregon sometime in the years prior to the Ramona Falls project, including a performance October 24, 2008 in New York under the name "Dear Everything." Some of this material was further developed for the band's first album Intuit.

Recording Intuit gave Knopf the opportunity to work with 35 colleagues from the Portland and New York areas. The album was recorded in Knopf's own studio and at the homes, practice rooms, churches, and other personal spaces of the featured guests.

Intuit and its songs did not chart, but received positive reviews from Pitchfork and Drowned In Sound and generated a large enough following for Knopf to justify leaving Menomena and release another album.

Prophet was released on May 1, 2012, and reached #28 on Billboard's Heatseaker Albums chart on May 19. Knopf took a direction on Prophet that was less centered on the acoustic guitar and focused on expanding the band's sound.

Prettymuchamazing chose Ramona Falls' drummer Paul Alcott as best drummer of SXSW 2012 for his "insane, massive fills" and stage antics, referencing times when Alcott would "come out from behind his kit, stand on bass amps and yell along, drum on the walls, play cymbals backwards, and shake around his giant red ‘fro."

== Other projects ==
Brent Knopf co-founded EL VY with Matt Berninger (lead singer of The National). The duo released their debut album Return to the Moon on October 30, 2015.

Brent Knopf has been creating music since before his inclusion into Menomena. He initially approached Danny Seim and Justin Harris with a demo tape while the duo were in a different band. Knopf is frequently credited as the creator of the Digital Loop Recorder (sometimes referred to as DLR or Deeler) used to help compose creative ideas for inclusion into Menomena's music. The Menomena song "Rose" is believed to be most wholly contributed to by Knopf among other songs.

Knopf also works as an album producer. He is credited as producer of the first two albums by South African band Dear Reader (formerly known as Harris Tweed), their debut Replace Why With Funny and sophomore effort Idealistic Animals. Knopf responded to Cherilyn MacNeil's request for a producer via Menomena's Myspace page. The two had not known each other prior but Cherilyn was a fan of Menomena and has since contributed to Intuit. Knopf also produced the first pair of albums by Lost Lander, (DRRT and Medallion), a band fronted by frequent collaborator Matt Sheehy.

Brent Knopf wrote the main theme for HBO's documentary miniseries Q Into the Storm, titled Catch 17. Knopf also writes music for Bob's Burgers and Central Park.

== Personnel ==
=== Guest appearances on the album Intuit ===
Paul Alcott, Soren Anders, Bryan Arakelian, John Askew, Alva Bostick, Kelly Brickner, Friedrich Brückner, Eric Day, Sayard Egan, Larah Eksteen, Kai Gross, Bonnie Knopf, Sarah Lewis, Loch Lomond (Ritchie Young, Dave Depper, Amanda Lawrence, Jason Leonard, Laurel Simmons, Scott Magee, Jade Eckler), Cherilyn MacNeil, Lisa Molinaro, Stefan Nadelman, Kevin O'Connor, Liam Palmer, Michael Papillo, Mark Shirazi, Colleen Sovory, Matt Sheehy, Amy Smidebush, Mike Visser, Benjamin Weikel, Janet Weiss, Jay Winebrenner, Mirah Y.T. Zeitlyn

=== Musicians who have performed in Ramona Falls ===
Brent Knopf (keys/guitar), Dave Lowensohn (bass), Paul Alcott (drums), Matt Sheehy (guitar), Brandon Laws (guitar/bass), Danny Seim (bass), Cheri MacNiel (guitar), Darryl Torr (bass), Michael Wright (drums), Jean-Louise Nel (viola and guitar), Lauren Jacobson (violin), Jerry Joiner (drums), Sean Flinn (guitar), and Patrick Hughes (drums).

== Discography ==
=== Studio albums ===
- Intuit (2009)
- Prophet (2012) #28 Heatseekers Album Chart
- Coils (2017)

=== Singles ===
Year	Song	Album
2009	"I Say Fever"	Intuit
2012	"Spore"	Prophet
2012	"Sqworm"	Prophet
