= Lackthereof =

American music project

- Origin: Portland, Oregon, United States
- Genres: home recording, lo-fi
- Labels: Cut & Paste Collective, FILMguerrero, Barsuk
- Members: Danny Seim
- Past members: Matt Dabrowiak; Jim Fairchild; Nick Jaina; Paul Alcott; Dave Depper; Holly Hilden; Kevin Robinson; Anita Robinson; Tyler Poage
- Website: https://www.idealmines.com/discography http://www.lackthereof.com/ MySpace Page

Lackthereof is the solo project of Danny Seim, a founding member of the Portland, Oregon-based band Menomena.

== History ==
The first six Lackthereof albums were recorded at home and given out to Seim's friends on cassettes and CD-R's. In 2005, FILMguerrero released Christian the Christian, making it the first album in the Lackthereof discography to receive any sort of formal distribution.

Seim took Lackthereof to a live setting for the first time in 2004, recruiting his then-wife Holly, friend Tyler Poage, and Kevin and Anita Robinson of the band Viva Voce. This lineup played one show at Portland's annual PDX Pop Now! Festival before disbanding.

The following year, Seim revived the project again, this time with the help of Holly, Matt Dabrowiak, and Paul Alcott of the band Dat'r.

To support the 2008 release of Your Anchor, Lackthereof performed several more shows in Portland with Alcott, Dabrowiak, Jim Fairchild (of All Smiles, Grandaddy and Modest Mouse), and Jon Ragel (of Boy Eats Drum Machine).

On October 13, 2009, Barsuk released the 20-track anthology A Lackthereof Retrospective 1998–2008, or I was a Christian Emo Twentysomething. The release compiles highlights from Seim's early home recording career, featuring songs that were never before released outside of cassettes and CD-R's given out to friends.

== Discography ==
=== Albums ===
- Self Titled: L (1998)
- 12 Songs for the Unstable (1999)
- In the Name of Protection (1999)
- Midnight Is Where the Day Begins (1999)
- Dulcet Little Love (2000)
- Malnutrition, Honey! (2002)
- Christian the Christian (2004)
- My Haunted (2008)
- Your Anchor (2008)
- A Lackthereof Retrospective 1998-2008 or I was a Christian Emo Twentysomething (2009)
- Building Personal Strength – a Single Song Album (Forgive Yourself) (2012)
- New Devonian (2023)

=== Split EPs ===
- Boil the Ocean – split EP w/ Francis (1999)
- Scissors and Blue – split EP w/ Francis (2001)

== Other notable collaborations ==
- Menomena
- Holcombe Waller
- All Smiles
- Ramona Falls
- Faux-Hoax
- Laura Gibson
- Pocket (musician)
- Dat'r
- Steve Taylor
- Corrina Repp
- Pfarmers
