= Your Anchor =

Studio album by Lackthereof
- Released: July 22, 2008
- Recorded: 2008
- Genre: Home recording, Lo-fi
- Length: 30:08
- Label: Barsuk

Lackthereof chronology
My Haunted (2008)	Your Anchor (2008)

Your Anchor is the ninth Lackthereof album, released on Barsuk Records on July 22, 2008. The album was recorded and mixed in Danny Seim's basement.

== Track listing ==
1. "Chest Pass (Your Anchor)"
2. "Fire Trial"
3. "Choir Practice"
4. "Doomed Elephants"
5. "Locked Upstairs"
6. "Last November"
7. "Ask Permission"
8. "You Can"
9. "Vacant Eyes"
10. "Fake Empire"
