= Friend and Foe =

Studio album by Menomena
- Released: January 23, 2007
- Genres: Art pop; indie rock; pop; post-rock; psychedelic pop
- Length: 47:43
- Labels: Barsuk; BARK60

Menomena chronology
| Under an Hour (2005) | Friend and Foe (2007) | Mines (2010) |

Friend and Foe is the third release from the Portland, Oregon-based band Menomena. It was released January 23, 2007 by Barsuk Records. The cover art is designed by Craig Thompson, writer and illustrator of the award-winning graphic novel Blankets.

Professional ratings
Aggregate scores
| Source | Rating |
|---|---|
| Metacritic | 78/100 |
Review scores
| Source | Rating |
| AllMusic | link |
| The Austin Chronicle | 3.5/5 stars |
| The A.V. Club | B+ link |
| No Ripcord | 8/10 |
| Paste | |
| Pitchfork | 8.5/10 |
| PopMatters | 5/10 |
| Prefix Magazine | 8/10 |
| Sputnikmusic | 4.0/5 link |
| Tiny Mix Tapes | 2.5/5 marks |

== Track listing ==
All songs written by Menomena: (Justin Harris, Brent Knopf and Danny Seim).

1. "Muscle'n Flo" – 4:20
2. "The Pelican" – 3:38
3. "Wet and Rusting" – 3:33
4. "Air Aid" – 4:44
5. "Weird" – 3:04
6. "Rotten Hell" – 4:18
7. "Running" – 1:52
8. "My My" – 3:48
9. "Boyscout'n" – 5:18
10. "Evil Bee" – 4:45
11. "Ghostship" – 2:28
12. "West" – 5:51

== Accolades ==
=== Songs ===
| Publication | Work | List | Rank | Ref. |
|---|---|---|---|---|
| Pitchfork | "The Pelican" | The 100 Best Songs of 2007 | 91 | |

== Charts ==
| Chart (2007) | Peak position |
|---|---|
| US Billboard Top Heatseekers | 9 |
| US Billboard Top Independent Albums | 25 |
