= Soren Anders =

American singer-songwriter

- Born: John T. Fischer; Illinois, U.S.
- Occupation: Musician
- Instruments: Vocals, multi-instrumentalist
- Years active: 2008–present
- Label: Shark Meat
- Website: Artist's Website

Soren Anders (born John T. Fischer) is an American composer, singer, record producer and instrumentalist from southern Illinois. He is the creator of the band Shimmerplanet.

== Early life ==
At the age of 16, Anders wrote his first piece, a melancholy instrumental composition for solo piano.

In college, Anders committed himself to the piano, studying under Mary Sauer.

Anders' has performed in many bands, most notably Shimmerplanet.

He has taught elementary school music, formed an award-winning children's gospel choir, and composed music for several plays and films. He subsequently relocated to New York, where he created Shimmerplanet.

== Career ==
Anders has been called "a breakthrough creatively" and "brilliant". "It takes artistic courage to be this lyrically honest and musically experimental," wrote Indie-Music.com. Awards from The Songwriters Hall of Fame, The Independent Music Awards, and Talent in Motion Magazine followed.

Anders has worked with 60s recording artist Lesley Gore, 80s recording artist Chris Stein (of Blondie), and recently, scored and conducted a choir for Menomena.
