= Shimmerplanet =

- Genres: Alternative
- Years active: 2005 - Present (Solo)
- Label: Shark Meat Records
- Members: Soren Anders, Carolyn Eufrasio
- Website: http://www.shimmerplanet.com

Shimmerplanet is an Indie band created by Soren Anders. They released their debut album "Welcome To Shimmerplanet" in 2002. The Songwriters Hall of Fame bestowed special recognition on the first single from that album "No Safe". Welcome To Shimmerplanet was hailed as "one of the most original and enjoyable releases in recent memory" (Gregg Shapiro, Windy City Times).

2006 saw the release of Shimmerplanet's second studio album "For The One Who Kills Tomorrow". The 60's pop icon Lesley Gore appears as a guest vocalist on one of the tracks, "Siren". Gore is one of three singers (including Anders) heard on the album; Avant-garde New York vocalist Carolyn Eufrasio returns in her role as Shimmerplanet's Yin, singing lead on many of the new songs. Recorded in New York City, "For The One Who Kills Tomorrow" is a testament to the recording ingenuity of Blake Morgan, who also helmed the studio for Shimmerplanet's debut album, "Welcome to Shimmerplanet". The album was mastered by Grammy-winning producer Phil Nicolo. Carolyn Eufrasio has also toured as Lesley Gore's back-up singer.

Soren Anders has also collaborated with Chris Stein of Blondie (on the off-Broadway play, "Sexotheque"). He wrote music for the film "Hope and a Little Sugar," starring India's Anupam Kher ("Bend It Like Beckham"), and has contributed music to numerous other films, including "Up to the Roof" by Norman Mailer's son, John Buffalo Mailer.He also sang the theme song to VH-1's "My Coolest Years." Lesley Gore recorded Soren Anders' song "Cool Web" on her 2005 comeback album entitled "Ever Since".

Winner of the 6th annual Independent Music Awards Vox Pop vote for best Pop/Rock song "Author".

== Discography ==
=== Albums ===
1. Welcome To Shimmerplanet (2002)
2. For The One Who Kills Tomorrow (2006)

=== Singles ===
1. Silence Of Midnight EP (2006)
