= Mines (album) =

Studio album by Menomena
- Released: July 27, 2010
- Genres: Indie rock; pop; experimental
- Length: 54:19
- Labels: Barsuk; City Slang
- Producer: Menomena

Menomena chronology
| Friend and Foe (2007) | Mines (2010) | Moms (2012) |

Professional ratings
Review scores
| Source | Rating |
|---|---|
| Allmusic | 4/5 stars |
| Drowned in Sound | 8/10 stars |
| The Guardian | 4/5 stars |
| NME | 9/10 stars |
| Paste | (8.5/10) |
| Pitchfork Media | (8.2/10) |
| PopMatters | (8/10) |
| Slant Magazine | 4/5 stars |
| Spin | 3/5 stars |
| Sputnikmusic | 4/5 stars |

Mines is the fourth album from the Portland, Oregon-based band Menomena. It was released on July 27, 2010 by Barsuk Records, in North America, and City Slang, in Europe. The album was self-produced and recorded by the band. The title comes from the plural possessive word of "mine", and the cover art features a picture of a broken sculpture in the woods printed in stereogram.

The album debuted on the Billboard 200 chart at #96.

In April 2010, the band recruited Joe Haege, of fellow Portland bands Tu Fawning and 31knots, as a touring member.

== Recording process ==
In a July 2009 interview, Justin Harris said "Over the course of the last year, we've pushed deadlines back further and further, due to various reasons. We weren't all on the same writing page, necessarily."

The album was recorded in the same way they've worked on their previous albums, by jamming and recording hundreds of loops spontaneously, using their Deeler software, then piecing together the loops and adding vocals. About the process, Danny Seim added "We made big strides building skeletal song structures, and did a decent job collaborating as the ideas began to take shape. But just when a song became familiar to one of us, the other two members broke it apart again, breaking each others’ hearts along the way. We rerecorded, rebuilt, and ultimately resented each other. And believe it or not, we’re all proud of the results."

Harris added "Over the last three years, there's been some just big changes in each one of our lives. That's also a solidifying of ideas of music-- what we think a song should contain, and what it shouldn't. Certainly in this album, it came out more emotional than any previous album has. Lyrics were a big focus for us this time around. It wasn't something we were consciously talking about."

== Tracks and singles ==
"Five Little Rooms" was the first song to premiere from the album. It was made available as a free download on the band's site on May 19, where the band noted that it was the last song to be chosen for the record.

The band first started playing the songs "Queen Black Acid" and "Killemall" in their fall 2009 tour.

In 2012, the track "TAOS" was used in the trailer and soundtrack for the independent film Blue Like Jazz.

== Track listing ==
All tracks are written by Menomena.

| No. | Title | Length |
|---|---|---|
| 1. | "Queen Black Acid" | 4:47 |
| 2. | "TAOS" | 5:00 |
| 3. | "Killemall" | 4:06 |
| 4. | "Dirty Cartoons" | 4:53 |
| 5. | "Tithe" | 4:53 |
| 6. | "BOTE" | 5:52 |
| 7. | "Lunchmeat" | 3:30 |
| 8. | "Oh Pretty Boy, You're Such a Big Boy" | 5:19 |
| 9. | "Five Little Rooms" | 4:57 |
| 10. | "Sleeping Beauty" | 5:18 |
| 11. | "INTIL" | 5:47 |

- The vinyl version of the album contains a hidden track known as "Side D" or "Bomb Me Back", while the iTunes Store offered a bonus track called "The Insulation".
- A double seven-inch vinyl was included as part of a special pre-order bundle. It contained radio edit versions of "TAOS" and "Five Little Rooms" along with b-sides "Copious" and "Let Me Know".
