= Under an Hour =

Studio album by Menomena
- Released: 2005
- Genre: Instrumental
- Length: 54:03
- Label: FILMguerrero
- Producer: Menomena

Menomena chronology
I Am the Fun Blame Monster! (2003)	Under an Hour (2005)	Friend and Foe (2007)

Professional ratings
Review scores
Source	Rating
AllMusic	3.5/5 stars
Stylus Magazine	B−
Pitchfork	7.9/10

Under an Hour is the second studio album from Portland-based experimental pop/rock group Menomena. The album was originally composed and performed as accompaniment for a performance by Portland dance company Monster Squad. Consisting of three instrumental tracks, the album is considered to be an experimental soundtrack along the lines of Peter Gabriel's Passion or Badly Drawn Boy's soundtrack for About a Boy.

The album packaging contains an ironic Parental Advisory sticker for "explicit content." However, the sticker is meant as a joke; the album contains no words.

== Track listing ==
1. "Water" – 17:52
2. "Flour" – 18:42
3. "Light" – 17:29
