= Marching Band (duo) =

Musical duo from Sweden

- Origin: Linköping, Östergötlands län, Sweden
- Genres: Indie rock Baroque pop Art rock Alternative rock
- Years active: 2005–present
- Labels: U & L Records, Inc
- Members: Erik Sunbring; Jacob Lind
- Website: http://www.marchingband.se/

Marching Band is a musical duo consisting of Erik Sunbring and Jacob Lind from Linköping, Sweden.

== History ==
In 2008, the band released Spark Large, their first full-length album on U & L Records. Music from the album received radio airplay in Los Angeles when tracks from the debut surfaced on KCRW and KDLD. In the months to follow, their music was featured on World Cafe, Second Stage, and Song of the Day. Marching Band was also featured in BillboardUnderground.

Marching Band songs have been featured in Zombieland, Nick & Norah's Infinite Playlist, 90210, How I Met Your Mother, Scrubs, Cougar Town, and Greek.

Marching Band’s second album, Pop Cycle, was released in May of 2010 on U & L Records.

Marching Band’s debut album was recorded in Los Angeles with Adam Lasus (Clap Your Hands Say Yeah, Yo La Tengo). Their sophomore album, Pop Cycle was recorded in Stockholm with Swedish producer Jari Haapalainen (Ed Harcourt, Camera Obscura, The Concretes).

Marching Band's song "Aggravate" was included on the indie compilation Indiecater Volume IV in August 2009.

Marching Band's EP, 'Pop Cycle Naked - EP' was released November 9, 2010, on U & L Records.

Marching Band's new EP, "And I've Never Seen Anything Like That", will be released on Jan 15, 2013. MTV debuted the band's music video "And I've Never",

Marching Band's, third full length "So Much Imagine", was released on Feb 21, 2014, digitally and as a double Vinyl containing 21 new tracks.

== Members ==
- Erik Sunbring - Guitars, Vocals
- Jacob Lind - Guitars, Keyboards, Vocals

== Supplemental Musicians ==
- Benjamin Forsberg - Guitars, Vocals
- Ludvig Kennberg - Drums
- Gustaf Nygren - Bass

== Releases ==
=== Albums ===
- EP 1 as Second Language - 2004
- EP 2 as Second Language - 2005
- EP 3 - 2006
- Spark Large - 2008, U & L Records, Inc.
- Pop Cycle - 2010, U & L Records, Inc.
- Pop Cycle Naked - EP - 2010, U & L Records, Inc.
- And I've Never Seen Anything Like That - EP - 2013, U & L Records, Inc.
- So Much Imagine - 2014, UNC Records (Europe), U & L Records, Inc. (North America), And Records (Japan)
- Heart Jewel - 2016, And Records.
