= Talkdemonic =

American avant-instrumental duo

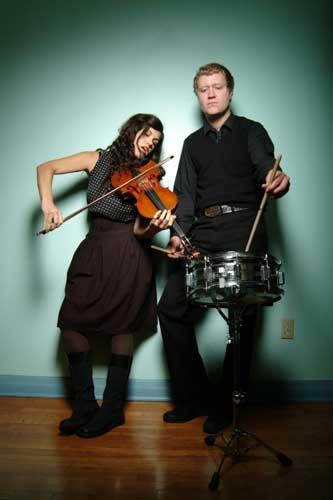
- Talkdemonic

Background information
- Origin: Portland, Oregon, U.S.
- Genres: Folktronica
- Years active: 2002–present
- Labels: Bathysphere Records; Lucky Madison; Glacial Pace Records; Arena Rock; One Little Independent
- Members: Kevin O'Connor
- Past members: Lisa Molinaro

Talkdemonic is an avant-instrumental band based in Brooklyn, New York. The band consists of Kevin O'Connor and formerly Lisa Molinaro. Talkdemonic signed with Isaac Brock's Glacial Pace Records to release their fourth record in Fall 2011.

== History ==
Talkdemonic was established by O'Connor in December 2002 after he moved from Pullman, Washington, to Portland. It began as a musical project to express his obsession with instrumental hip hop and electronic music. O'Connor said he was at a local club when he heard a voice utter the word "talkdemonic" and he felt it fit his new project perfectly.

Their first album, Mutiny Sunshine, was released in May 2004 by Lucky Madison. It was recorded over the period of a year at talknumeric and Miracle Lake studios with Skyler Norwood engineering. After a few solo tours, O'Connor convinced Molinaro to become a full-time member.

Talkdemonic was named "Portland's Best New Band 2005" by the Willamette Week and toured with The National and Clap Your Hands Say Yeah in the fall of 2005.

The band spent most of 2005 recording and playing shows. They signed with the Arena Rock Recording Co. The label released their second record, Beat Romantic, in March 2006. The album received critical acclaim. Pitchfork media wrote of the album "When the punctuated rhythm of programmed percussion gives way to cascading cymbal crashes and spacious break beats, it's nothing short of cathartic." Following the release of the album, the band toured the country twice over with bands like Quasi, The Walkmen, Scout Niblett and The National.

In February 2007, Talkdemonic signed with One Little Indian in the UK. Their offshoot label, Tangled Up! was to issue a deluxe expanded edition of Beat Romantic in Europe on September 17, 2007. The enhanced version was to include a cover of Brian Eno's "Sombre Reptiles" and a video for "Mountain Cats".

Lisa also spent six months as a touring multi-instrumentalist and vocalist with the Decemberists in late 2006 and early 2007. She was a full-time member of Modest Mouse and was in a committed relationship with the band's frontman, Isaac Brock. They broke up sometime in 2017–2018 and she left the band in June 2021.

In August 2022, Talkdemonic announced a new record Various Seasides, to be released on October 28, 2022, by Lucky Madison. The band is now a solo project of Kevin O'Connor, as it was in 2003. The video for 'Glass Tower' was released on October 17, and premiered on The Big Takeover website.

== Touring ==
Originally, O'Connor played live shows alone with Molinaro's pre-recorded viola pieces and accordion, banjo, guitar, and piano played via laptop computer. In the summer of 2004, O'Connor convinced Molinaro to play live shows with him.

Talkdemonic has since toured several times nationally and along the west coast. During a Midwest tour they opened for Clap Your Hands Say Yeah and The National.

For Olivier Theyskien's Spring 2008 show under the Nina Ricci label, DJ Michel Gaubert used several Talkdemonic songs for the soundtrack.

In October 2011 it was announced that Talkdemonic will be opening for Modest Mouse for two of their shows in Austin and Dallas Texas in early November.

== Members ==
- Kevin O'Connor (percussion, synthesizer, piano, multi-instrumentalist)
- Lisa Molinaro (Former Member) (viola, synthesizer, bass)

== Discography ==
- Mutiny Sunshine (Lucky Madison, April 2004; Lucky Madison reissue January 2005)
- Tour EP (Arena Rock Recording Co., 2005)
- Beat Romantic (Arena Rock Recording Co., March 2006, US) (Tangled Up! Recordings, September 2007, UK)
- Eyes at Half Mast (Arena Rock Recording Co., September 2008)
- Ruins (Glacial Pace Recordings, October 2011)
- Various Seasides (Lucky Madison, October 2022)
- Very Cool Yesterday (Bathysphere, September 2025)
