= Ural Thomas =

American soul music singer (born 1939)

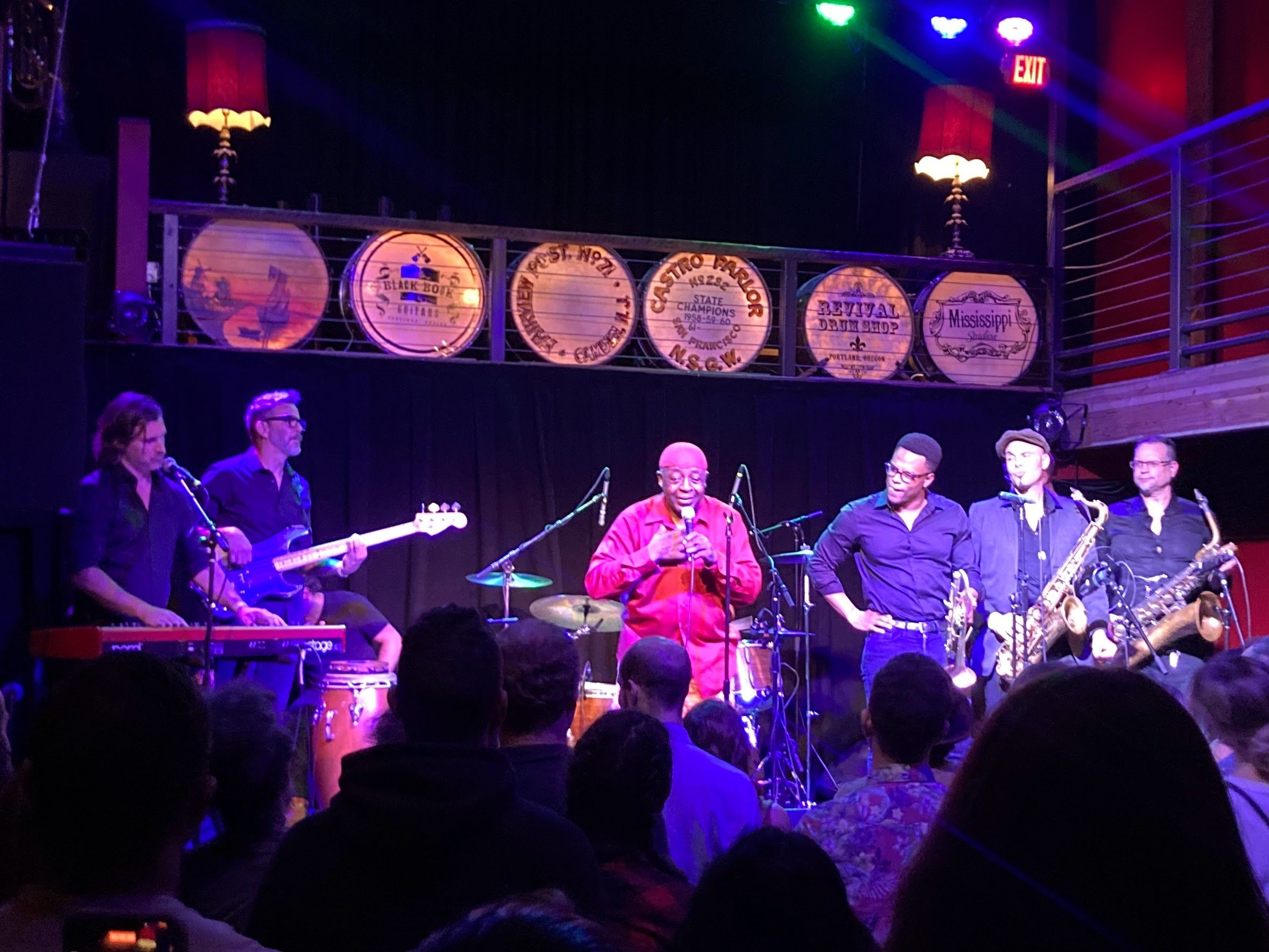
Ural Thomas and the Pain play at Mississippi Studios.

Ural Thomas (born 21 December 1939) is an American soul music singer. While Thomas has made music for over fifty years, his public performances span two eras: the 1950s through the 1960s, and from 2013 through the present as Ural Thomas and the Pain.

== Early life and career ==
Thomas was born in Louisiana, learning to sing in church. The seventh of sixteen children, his family relocated to Portland, Oregon when he was a young child. He attended Jefferson High School.

Thomas became a professional singer in the 1950s as a young man, with over forty performances at the Apollo Theater. He worked with or opened for musicians such as Etta James, Otis Redding, James Brown, and Stevie Wonder. Thomas moved back to Portland in 1968.

== Ural Thomas and the Pain ==
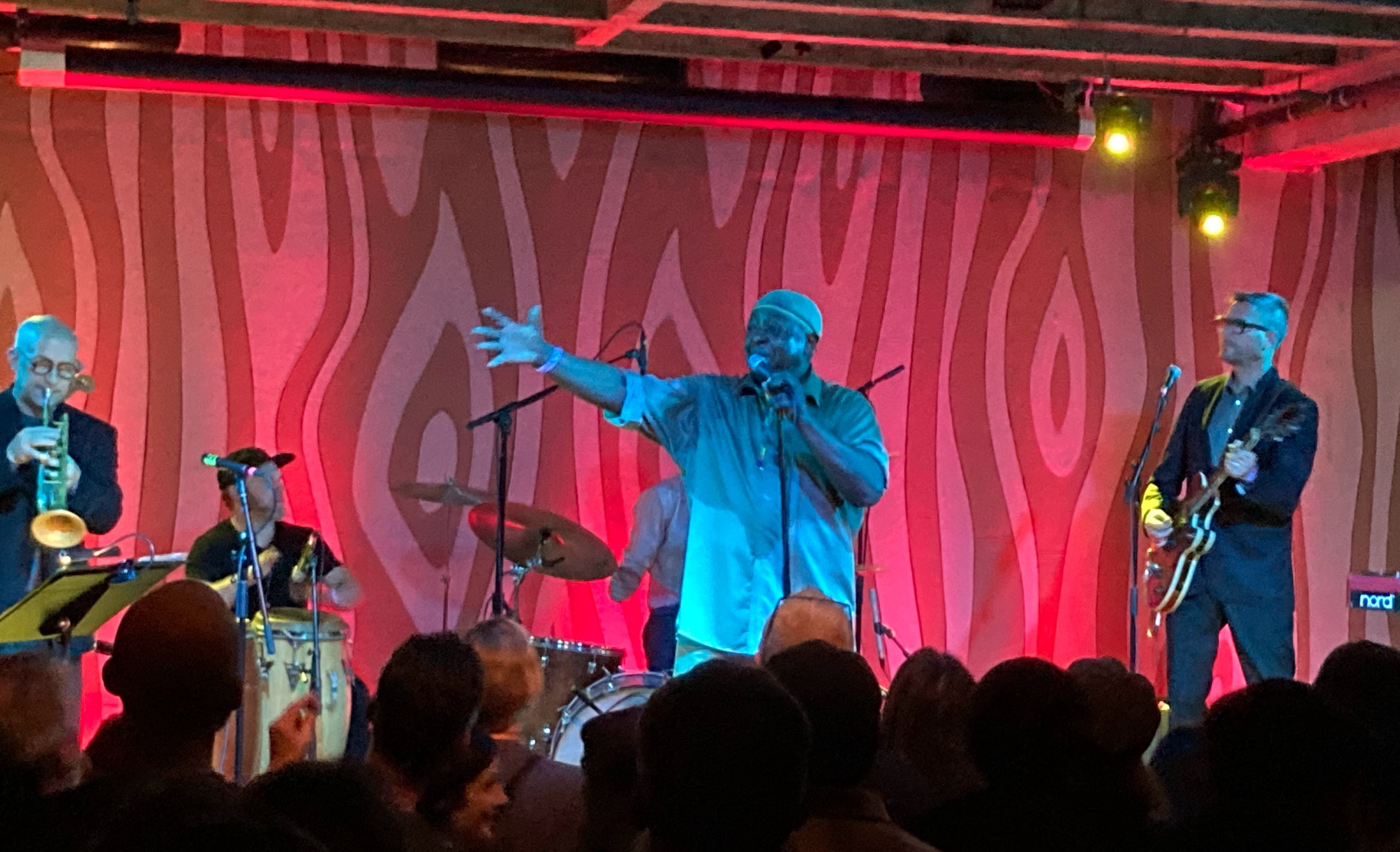
Ural Thomas and the Pain at the Doug Fir Lounge in 2022

In the early 2010s Scott Magee, a Portland-based soul DJ, learned via the owner of Mississippi Records that Thomas—whose early records he spun—still lived in Portland. Despite having weekly jam sessions in his home, a tradition started in the 1970s, Thomas seldom played live shows. Together, Thomas and Magee created Ural Thomas and the Pain, an eight-piece backing band for Thomas's vocals. The group has released two full-length albums: 2016's self-titled release and 2018's The Right Time, the latter of which was released on the label Tender Loving Empire. The band has played in venues as large as the main stage of the Waterfront Blues Festival. Their third album, Dancing Dimensions, was released on Bella Union in June, 2022.
