= Tracker (band) =

American indie rock band

- Origin: Portland, Oregon, U.S.
- Genres: Indie rock
- Years active: 1998 – present
- Label: FILMguerrero
- Website: www.trackermusic.com

Tracker is an American indie rock ensemble from Portland, Oregon. The act was founded in 1998 by John Askew, a freelance audio engineer and writer for Tape Op magazine.

== History ==
Askew, a multi-instrumentalist, initially created studio recordings with little (if any) assistance under the name Tracker, but later recruited a revolving lineup of musicians for live performances. Those included Michael Schorr (formerly of Death Cab for Cutie) and Dave Harding (formerly of Richmond Fontaine). Askew also founded the record label FILMguerrero which supports other independent musicians in Portland.

The first album under the Tracker name was Ames in 2001, followed by Polk in 2002. Askew transformed Tracker into a full-time touring and recording band after the Ames album. The first two albums were named after towns in Iowa that Askew had never visited. The album Blankets (2004) serves as a soundtrack to a graphic novel of the same title by Craig Thompson. That album included guest appearances by Chris Funk (The Decemberists), Willy Vlautin (Richmond Fontaine), and Adam Selzer (Norfolk & Western).

== Discography ==
- Ames (2001)
- Polk (2002)
- Blankets (2004)
