= Lost Lander =

Indie rock band from Portland, Oregon

- Origin: Portland, Oregon, United States
- Genres: Indie rock
- Years active: 2011–present
- Label: Glad I Did Recordings
- Members: Matt Sheehy, Sarah Fennell, Patrick Hughes, William Seiji Marsh
- Past members: Dave Lowensohn
- Website: www.lostlander.space

Lost Lander is an indie rock project founded by Matt Sheehy, touring multi-instrumentalist for Ramona Falls and EL VY, and former member of the duo Gravity & Henry. The band's name is taken from a dream Sheehy's mother had about a place where she spent part of her childhood named Lost Land Lake.

Many of the band's songs are autobiographical for Sheehy, inspired by his personal experiences like the death of his mother, the disintegration of his marriage engagement, and his ensuing relationship with longtime friend/bandmate Sarah Fennell.

Lost Lander has released three studio albums and performed over 200 shows in the US, Canada, Europe, and Russia. In support of their debut album DRRT, Lost Lander toured the US in 2012, making a stop at SXSW. An international tour followed in 2014.

After the release of their sophomore album Medallion, Lost Lander again toured the US in 2015. Along the way, the band performed at both Portland's annual MusicfestNW with Foster The People & Modest Mouse, and Seattle's annual Capitol Hill Block Party alongside Tv On The Radio, The Kills, Built To Spill & Toro Y Moi.

== Discography ==
=== Studio albums ===
- DRRT (2012)
- Medallion (2015)
- Aberdeen (2019)

=== Singles ===
Year	Single	Album
2012	"Cold Feet"	DRRT
2012	"Afraid Of Summer"	DRRT
2015	"Walking On A Wire"	Medallion
2015	"Gemini"	Medallion
2019	"Late Late Late"	Aberdeen
