= Dat'r =

- Origin: Portland, Oregon, United States
- Genres: Funk, Electronica, Indie rock
- Years active: 2007?–present
- Label: Hush
- Members: Matt Dabrowiak; Paul Alcott

Dat'r is an Electronic music band consisting of Matt Dabrowiak and Paul Alcott, from Portland, Oregon.

== History ==
Dat'r was originally formed as a side project of the Portland-based Rock band Binary Dolls. Alcott and Dabrowiak began pursuing Dat'r when Binary Dolls' singer Nick Jaina decided to focus on writing and performing Folk music.

Shortly after the release of their Hush Records debut Turn Up the Ghosts, Dat'r was voted #6 on the "Top Ten Best New Bands in Portland" by the Willamette Week, a local newspaper. The album was praised by PopMatters, calling it "well-executed" and, "fun-as-hell".

Dat'r incorporates many different types of electronic instruments (game console joysticks, laptops, keyboards) and percussive instruments (shakers, cymbals, tambourines) into their energetic live performances. The duo performed at the 2007 annual PDX Pop Now! Festival in Portland.

The band has currently been recording a new album since October 2008 with no anticipated release date at this time.

== Discography ==
- Turn Up the Ghosts (2007)
- Blowout
