= Menomena =

American indie rock band

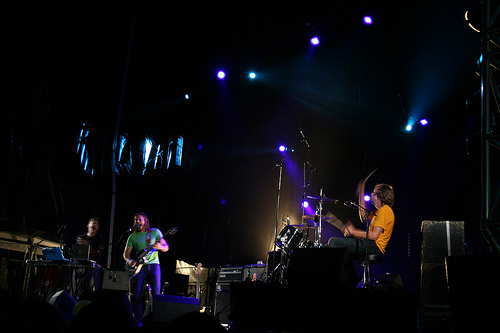
- Évreux, France - July 2007

Background information
- Origin: Portland, Oregon, United States
- Genres: Indie rock; post-rock
- Years active: 2000–present (on hiatus 2014-2023)
- Labels: Barsuk, FILMguerrero
- Formerly of: Lackthereof; Ramona Falls; EL VY; Pfarmers; Bloc Party
- Members: Danny Seim; Justin Harris; Brent Knopf
- Website: menomena.com

Menomena /mɪˈnɒmɪnə/ is an indie rock band from Portland, Oregon, United States, made up of Justin Harris and Danny Seim. Both members of the band share singing duties and frequently swap instruments while recording. In concert, Seim plays drums, while Harris swaps between a number of instruments.

== History ==
Menomena began as a side project of Seim's solo project, Lackthereof. The band formed in late 2000, when Brent Knopf graduated from Dartmouth College and returned to Portland to collaborate with Harris and Seim.

The name "Menomena" was chosen for "the way it rolls off the tongue, sexually, or something" and has no specific meaning, although it is often assumed to refer to the Piero Umiliani song "Mah Nà Mah Nà", a staple of The Muppet Show. In an audio clip from SpotDJ, Knopf sarcastically stated that the band name was a combination of the words "Men" and "Phenomena." It is Greek for "what remains."

Menomena played their first show on July 20, 2001, at The Meow Meow, a now-defunct all ages venue in Portland. The trio opened with a cover version of "The Abandoned Hospital Ship" by The Flaming Lips.

Shortly after, they joined the roster of High Road Touring, a San Francisco-based booking agency. For their first U.S. tour in 2004, Menomena drove a 1977 Dodge Sportsman RV. The aging vehicle suffered many breakdowns along the way. Knopf detailed these issues in an interview in Spin: "Systems that failed (and had to be replaced) during the tour included the following: tires, muffler, brake, master cylinder, exhaust manifold, windshield wipers, horn, side-view mirrors (both fell off). Oh, and did I mention that there were two fires? Not one. Two. This vehicle promptly earned the moniker 'RV Danger.'" RV Danger (most likely a reference to Seattle band Harvey Danger) was later immortalized in a tour poster illustrated by Tyler Stout, who has collaborated with the band on numerous occasions. Other notable tours in Menomena's early career were with Gang of Four, The National, and The Long Winters.

After several releases and national tours, Menomena signed with Barsuk Records in August 2006. The band still maintains a relationship with their original label, FILMguerrero. It was stated that FILMguerrero will continue be involved in their back catalog and possibly with future vinyl releases.

Menomena signed a contract with German record label City Slang, to release their album Friend and Foe across Europe on August 31, 2007. The band toured Europe twice that year, and their adventures were extensively chronicled by Seim in a blog for Portland-based website Local Cut.

=== I Am the Fun Blame Monster! (2003) ===
After giving away several different homemade demo CD-R recordings at local shows, Knopf, Harris, and Seim stuck with the DIY aesthetic of their early demos by recording their first album themselves. The result was their nine-song debut, I Am the Fun Blame Monster! (an anagram for "The First Menomena Album"), which was self-released on May 20, 2003. The album was elaborately packaged in an 80-page flipbook that Seim designed and individually hand-assembled while working at Kinko's.

A friend advised the band to mail a copy of their album to Pitchfork, a popular music website that Seim "had never heard of" at the time. Several months later, Pitchfork gave the album an 8.7/10 rating, and placed it in the "Best New Music" section. The band continued to assemble the flipbooks by hand and distribute them with the help of online retailer CD Baby until late 2004, when the album was released nationwide by FILMguerrero, a Portland-based independent record label.

The song "Strongest Man in the World" is featured on the soundtrack to the film Paranoid Park, which was not only set and filmed in Portland, but also directed by fellow Rip City resident Gus Van Sant. Danny Seim has written about his youth involvement in Portland's skate culture for soundcheckmagazine.com.

=== Under an Hour (2005) ===
On November 8, 2005, Menomena released Under an Hour, an album of instrumental music written for and performed with Monster Squad, an experimental dance company based in Portland. The release consists of only three tracks, each of which is over seventeen minutes in length. Stylus Magazine gave the album a somewhat lukewarm "B−" and described it as, "…an interesting view into a band that continues to evolve without really throwing down any breadcrumbs for them or us to follow."

=== Friend and Foe (2007) ===
Menomena released their third album (and first via Barsuk Records) on January 23, 2007. As with their first two releases, Friend and Foe was entirely produced, recorded, and mixed by the band. It received relative critical acclaim—while some websites such as Lost at Sea praised the album for its offbeat rhythmic structure and creative use of melody, others such as PopMatters criticized it for presenting a sense of feigned maturity. Pitchfork gave the album an 8.5/10 and again placed it in the "Best New Music" section, calling it, "…The first great indie rock record of the new year." To celebrate the release of the album, Harris assembled a 25-member choir and taught them the various vocal layers of the new material with the help of his mother Diane, a trained opera singer. The choir was made up of other Portland-based bands and artists, including The Helio Sequence, 31Knots, Nick Jaina, Pseudosix, Dat'r, Boy Eats Drum Machine, Corrina Repp, Miss Murgatroid, prussia, and several other of Harris' close friends. The Friend and Foe CD release show was held at Portland's Crystal Ballroom on January 28, 2007.

The CD and LP (the latter was released in August 2007 by FILMguerrero) features an intricate packaging layout consisting of Die-cut shapes, decoder rings, and hidden messages. It was designed by Knopf and illustrated by cult graphic novelist/cartoonist Craig Thompson, of Blankets fame. Thompson's artwork for Friend and Foe was nominated for a Grammy Award for "Best Recording Package."

=== Mines (2010) ===
Danny Seim stated in an October 2008 interview that a new Menomena album was tentatively expected to debut in the beginning of 2009. "In a perfect world, we would have been done with a new record. Fall ’08 would have been great. But then that's moved to January ’09 … we hadn’t seen one another in awhile [sic] and we’re seeing each other for some European dates, and a festival date here and there. We’re moving on a U2 time frame. ...We have a ton of material to use and we have to structure the stuff, pick up instruments and find songs. I’d love to say January ’09 but maybe I just like the way those words sound."

Menomena spent most of 2009 in and out of the studio. A collection of pictures from these sessions were posted on their official Myspace, although no comments were made about the album's progress. In December, Pitchfork posted a video of Menomena playing a brand new track, "Queen Black Acid", in a hotel room, and in January Menomena stated, "We're finishing our new album in two weeks..." via Twitter.

It was confirmed by Pitchfork on April 7, 2010, that Menomena's fourth full-length album, Mines, would be released on July 26 in Europe via City Slang and July 27 in North America via Barsuk. A 7-inch split with The Helio Sequence would also be released on Record Store Day, with Menomena contributing the new track "Pilgrim's Progress".

=== Brent Knopf's departure ===
On January 7, 2011, Menomena announced the departure of Brent Knopf on the Menomena website: "After 10 years of fruitful collaboration, Brent Knopf has decided to part ways with Menomena to focus on Ramona Falls and other creative pursuits. We want to thank Brent for his vast contributions over the years and wish him nothing but happiness in all of his future endeavors. All three of us look forward to seeing you soon!" Knopf was replaced by Paul Alcott for the remaining Mines tour dates. Both Knopf and Danny Seim addressed the matter in an interview posted on the Portland-based Local Cut blog two weeks later. Seim mentioned that he and Justin Harris will continue to make music as Menomena, stating, "We lost a major creative force in Brent, but thankfully, Brent's not Kurt Cobain, and we’re not Nirvana. Brent's more like Peter Gabriel and we’re more like Genesis. And everyone knows how much better Genesis got after that talentless hack Gabriel quit. Waitaminute…"

=== Moms (2012) ===
On June 6, 2012, Menomena announced their fifth album, Moms, which was released September 18, 2012. The album has been noted for its more personal lyrical themes, which address both members' relationships with their mothers.

=== Reunion, The Insulation EP (2024), Knopf's return ===
On April 16, 2024, the band surprise released The Insulation EP, their first release in 12 years. The band also announced a series of digital reissues of their previous albums, as well as a live performance of their debut, I Am the Fun Blame Monster! in Portland, with Knopf rejoining the band. The concert will mark the band's first live performance in ten years, and their first with Knopf since 2011.

== Live performance ==
In a performance setting, Menomena attempts to replicate the often dense instrumentation found on their recordings without the use of backing tracks.

Throughout the course of a typical concert, Harris plays electric guitar(s), baritone guitar, electric bass, Moog Taurus foot synthesizer (or a Roland Pk-5 when touring Europe), baritone saxophone, and alto saxophone; Seim plays drums and other percussion. Both members contribute vocal harmonies and sing lead on different songs.

In 2007, Craig Thompson appeared on stage with Menomena at several concerts over the course of a European tour. Throughout these performances, Thompson painted along with the music using a brush and ink on a large sheet of butcher paper. At the end of each show, the pieces were ripped into shreds and thrown into the audience.

Menomena added multi-instrumentalist Joe Haege of 31Knots as a touring member in 2010. On August 9, the band made their national television debut as a four-piece with Haege on Late Night with Jimmy Fallon.

== Creative process ==
The band's songwriting process involves a computer program called the Digital Looping Recorder, or Deeler for short. It was programmed by Knopf using the language Max. Seim explains the process: "First, we set the tempo of the click, which is played through a pair of headphones. We then take turns passing a single mic around the room. One of us will hold the mic in front of an instrument, while another one of us will lay down a short improvised riff over the click track. We usually start with the drums. Once the drums begin looping, we throw on some bass, piano, guitar, bells, sax, or whatever other sort of noisemaker happens to be in the room. Deeler keeps the process democratic, which is the only way we can operate."

The use of Deeler as a compositional tool was discussed extensively by the band in an interview published in the May/June 2005 issue (#47) of Tape Op magazine.

Menomena is a band with no primary songwriter, and their albums develop through a slow exchange of song ideas - usually via email. "I'm not aware of a single instance when we were together [recording]," said Brent Knopf of the album Mines. The Portland Mercury described this as a "painstaking cut-and-paste method of song assembly ... as each member contributes, then vanishes, only to return later to add more."

== Grammy Awards and nominations ==
Year	Nominee / work	Award	Result
2007	"Friend and Foe"	Best Recording Package	Nominated

== Discography ==
=== Albums ===
- I Am the Fun Blame Monster! CD/LP (self-released, 2003; re-released FILMguerrero, 2004; re-released SlyVinyl, 2019)
- Under an Hour CD (FILMguerrero, 2005)
- Friend and Foe CD/LP (Barsuk/FILMguerrero, 2007)
- Mines CD/LP (Barsuk, 2010)
- Moms CD/LP (Barsuk, 2012)

=== EPs ===
- Rose EP (self-released, February 2001)
- Scissors and Blue (split EP w/ Societa Anonima) (Velvet Blue Music/ Cut & Paste Collective, 2002)
- Wet and Rusting (FILMguerrero, 2006)
- The Insulation EP (2024)

=== 7" singles ===
- "Posh Isolation" / "Tung Track" (Polyvinyl Record Co., 2005)
- "Wet and Rusting" / "Gay A" (City Slang, 2007)
- "Heliomena" "/ "Pilgrim's Progress" (split 7-inch with The Helio Sequence) (2010)
