= Goosebumps (2023 TV series) =

2023 American supernatural horror television series

- Also known as: Goosebumps: The Vanishing (season 2)
- Genre: Supernatural horror
- Developed by: Rob Letterman & Nicholas Stoller
- Showrunner: Hilary Winston
- Starring: Zack Morris; Isa Briones; Miles McKenna; Ana Yi Puig; Will Price; Rachael Harris; Justin Long; David Schwimmer; Ana Ortiz; Jayden Bartels; Sam McCarthy; Elijah M. Cooper; Francesca Noel; Galilea La Salvia
- Music by: The Newton Brothers
- Country of origin: United States
- Original language: English
- No. of seasons: 2
- No. of episodes: 18

Production
- Executive producers: Nicholas Stoller; Rob Letterman; Hilary Winston; Neal H. Moritz; Iole Lucchese; Pavun Shetty; Conor Wrench; Caitlin Friedman; Erin O'Malley; Kevin Murphy; James Egan; Karl Frankenfield
- Producers: Justis Greene; Franklin Jin Rho; Paul M. Leonard; Samara Levenstein
- Cinematography: Thomas Yatsko; Stephen McNutt; Eric Moynier; Ron Fortunato
- Editors: Christopher S. Capp; Tuan Quoc Le; Debby Germino; Darren C. Bui; Bill Henry; Wadeh Arraf; Vanessa Procopio; Paul Penczner
- Running time: 36–48 minutes
- Production companies: Original Film; Stoller Global Solutions; Gifted And Talented Camp; Scholastic Entertainment; Sony Pictures Television (Note: Credited as Sony Pictures Television Studios for season 1.)

Original release
- Network: Disney+; Hulu
- Release: October 13, 2023 – January 10, 2025

Goosebumps is an American supernatural horror television series developed by Rob Letterman and Nicholas Stoller for Disney+ and Hulu. It is based on the book series by R. L. Stine. The series abandons the episodic anthology format of the 1995 television series to focus on a serialized style of storytelling instead, changing storylines from season to season instead of episode to episode while still featuring some of the existing Goosebumps monsters and items episodically.

The series was first announced in 2020 to be in development by Sony Pictures Television alongside Original Film and Scholastic Entertainment, all of whom previously developed the films Goosebumps (2015) and Goosebumps 2: Haunted Halloween (2018), based on the books. Letterman, the first film's director, was hired by 2022 to write and produce the series alongside Stoller. Letterman also directed the pilot episode.

Goosebumps was released on October 13, 2023, on Disney+ and Hulu simultaneously as a part of the "Hallowstream" and "Huluween" streaming blocks, respectively. It received mixed reviews from critics. In February 2024, the series was renewed for a second season, titled Goosebumps: The Vanishing, which premiered on Disney+ and Hulu on January 10, 2025. In August 2025, the series was canceled after two seasons.

The series received nineteen Children's and Family Emmy Award nominations throughout its two seasons.

== Synopsis ==
In the first season, a group of five high school teens embark on a shadowy and twisted journey to investigate the tragic passing three decades earlier of a teenage boy named Harold Biddle — while also unearthing dark secrets from their parents' past.

In the second season, twins Cece and Devin, on a vacation at their father's, decide to enter an abandoned and supposedly haunted Fort with a few friends, without realizing they're setting off a chain of events that will unravel a profound mystery connected to the mysterious disappearance of four teenagers 30 years back.

== Cast and characters ==
=== Season 1 ===
==== Main ====
- Zack Morris as Isaiah, the star quarterback of the Port Lawrence High School football team
- Isa Briones as Margot, Isaiah's neighbor and friend
- Miles McKenna as James, Isaiah's best friend who is from one of the wealthiest families in Port Lawrence
- Ana Yi Puig as Isabella, a girl ignored at school and neglected by her mother
- Will Price as Lucas, a teenager who likes extreme sports and has become very reckless since the passing of his father
- Rachael Harris as Nora, Lucas's mother
- Justin Long as Mr. Nathan Bratt, the new English teacher at Port Lawrence High School who inherits the Biddle House and becomes possessed by Harold Biddle's spirit

==== Recurring ====
- Rob Huebel as Colin, Margot's father and a guidance counsellor at Port Lawrence High School
- Leonard Roberts as Ben, Isaiah's father
- Ben Cockell as Harold Biddle, a teenager who died in a mysterious house fire in 1993
- Rhinnan Payne as Allison, Isaiah's girlfriend
- Françoise Yip as Victoria, Isabella's overly strict mother
- Laura Mennell as Eliza, James's multi-millionaire mother
- Lexa Doig as Sarah, Margot's estranged mother, who was involved in Harold Biddle's death
- Chris Geere as Kanduu / Slappy the Dummy, Harold's evil ventriloquist dummy. Geere also portrays Kanduu, an evil sorcerer whose spirit was trapped inside Slappy's body.

==== Guest ====
- Eddie Jemison as Ephraim Bratt, Harold's great-grandfather, who was given Slappy in 1925
- Jonathan Silverman and Gillian Vigman as Perry and Georgia Biddle, Harold's parents, who along with their son, move into the house in 1993

=== Season 2 ===
==== Main ====
- David Schwimmer as Anthony Brewer, a former botany professor and divorced parent of teenage twins
  - Patrick Scott McDermott as Young Anthony
- Ana Ortiz as Jen
  - Isabella Ferreira as Young Jen
- Jayden Bartels as Cece
- Sam McCarthy as Devin
- Elijah M. Cooper as CJ
- Francesca Noel as Alex
- Galilea La Salvia as Frankie

==== Recurring ====
- Stony Blyden as Trey, Frankie's boyfriend
- Sakina Jaffrey as Ramona Pamani
  - Sahana Srinivasan as Young Ramona
- Christopher Paul Richards as Matty
- Eloise Payet as Hannah
- Arjun Athalye as Sameer
- Kyra Tantao as Nicole

==== Guest ====
- Sendhil Ramamurthy as Dr. Avi Pamani

== Episodes ==
Season	Episodes	Originally released	
Season	Episodes	First released	Last released
1	10	October 13, 2023	November 17, 2023
2	8	January 10, 2025	

=== Season 1 (2023) ===
No. overall	No. in season	Title	Directed by	Written by	Original release date
1	1	"Say Cheese and Die!"	Rob Letterman	Rob Letterman & Nicholas Stoller	October 13, 2023
In 1993, high school loner Harold Biddle dies in a house fire. Thirty years later, Mr. Bratt inherits the Biddle House and becomes the new high school English teacher. Star high school quarterback Isaiah and his girlfriend Allison use the Biddle House for their Halloween party. Isaiah finds a Polaroid camera in the basement where Harold died and takes a photo of Allison and Margot, his neighbor and childhood friend. When he saves Margot from an allergic reaction he saw her having on her photo, he realizes the camera depicts future bad things that will happen to the people in its photos. His photo shows him with a badly broken arm; sure enough, Isaiah breaks his arm at the game after hallucinating that the football field is full of burning monsters. Nora, the mother of Lucas, a reckless student, sees the monsters and warns Isaiah's father that Biddle has returned to punish their kids for what they, the parents, did to him. At home, Bratt is possessed by Harold's spirit.
2	2	"The Haunted Mask"	Erin O'Malley	Franklin Jin Rho	October 13, 2023
Ignored at school, student Isabella vents her frustrations by online trolling. At Allison's Halloween party at the Biddle House, she finds an unusual mask in the basement. Upon wearing it, she becomes more extroverted and confident. As time passes, the mask influences her to lash out at people, especially after Lucas destroys her $3,000 drone. Nora passes on a photo of Harold Biddle to Isaiah, who recognizes him from the hallucination at the football game. When Isabella is punished by her mother for the drone, she wears the mask and attacks Lucas, transforming into an actual troll. When she almost attacks her little brother, she stops herself, and they discard the mask while the possessed Bratt watches. Isabella accompanies her mother to the house of James, Isaiah's best friend, where Nora has gathered the other parents to discuss her belief that Harold is haunting them. As they angrily rebuff her, Isabella knocks a ball at James while playing pool, and he explodes into yellow goo, horrifying her.
3	3	"The Cuckoo Clock of Doom"	Erin O'Malley	James Eagan	October 13, 2023
The truth about James is revealed: at the Halloween party, he accidentally hit his head on a cuckoo clock and became stuck in a time loop, unable to leave the house. When he is finally able to turn off the clock and stop the time loop, he learns that every one of his previous attempts to leave the house created a duplicate. The "Dupes" trap him in his family's mines, impersonate him, and begin ruining his life until Isabella realizes what's happened after a Dupe explodes in front of her. She, Isaiah, and Margot work together to find the real James and destroy the Dupes. The group realizes that everything that's happened to them began at the Biddle house. Nora implies that Margot's mother, Sarah, has the answers. On a call, Sarah, who is in Seattle, tells Margot not to trust the other parents. A surviving Dupe retrieves a suitcase for Bratt, but upon finding it empty, Bratt destroys the Dupe, angrily asking where his "friend" is.
4	4	"Go Eat Worms"	Steve Boyum	Courtney Perdue & Baindu Saidu	October 13, 2023
Lucas' father died attempting a dangerous mountain stunt. Lucas tries to honor his father's legacy by doing the stunt but is afraid. He witnesses his mother, Nora, and Margot's father, Colin, kissing and gently informs Margot of their parents' affair. To cheer her up, he shows her the tank of worms he took from the Biddle House during the Halloween party. That night, the worms slither their way into Lucas' body. He realizes he can no longer feel pain and decides to attempt his father's stunt again. Margot realizes Biddle is involved, and she and Nora stop Lucas. Nora reveals that his father was suicidal and did the stunt on purpose to die. Lucas throws up the worms, which conjoin into a monster. The trio lures it into a wood chipper and kills it. Nora lands in a psychiatric ward after telling the police about the monster. Bratt takes the eyeball trinket Lucas had dropped at the sawmill and promises that Slappy will be put back together.
5	5	"Reader Beware"	Steve Boyum	Mariko Tamaki	October 13, 2023
Margot's mother, Sarah, comes home after months of a trial separation with Colin. She learns that Nora is sedated under the supervision of Victoria, Isabella's mother, as Victoria is afraid Nora might reveal their involvement in the Biddle incident. However, Sarah believes Nora. Isaiah and Allison break up. Isaiah might have feelings for Margot. However, Margot and Lucas have bonded and kiss. Mr. Bratt/Harold gives his old scrapbook to Margot. Upon reading it, she sees visions of Harold's high school life and learns that he and her mother were friends. Harold's ghost takes Margot to the night of the fire, where the friends learn that all of their parents inadvertently caused Harold's death after trying to steal a suitcase from his house. Bratt/Harold invites them into his home, saying he will reveal what is inside the suitcase.
6	6	"Night of the Living Dummy"	Félix Enríquez Alcalá	Nick Mueller	October 20, 2023
In 1925, Harold's great-grandfather Ephraim bought Slappy the Dummy, an evil puppet, to revitalize his career as a magician. Slappy had Ephraim retrieve the coffin of a man named Kanduu to read a spell. After a violent vision of people dying, Ephraim rejected Slappy and hid him in his basement. In 1993, Ephraim's descendants, the Biddle couple and their son Harold, inherit his house. Harold has a hard time fitting in and discovers Slappy, who isolates him from his crush, Sarah, and has him turn his parents into puppets. After Slappy and Harold humiliate Sarah and her friends, they realize Harold changed after he found Slappy. The group breaks into his home to take Slappy away and begs Harold to come out after he locks himself in the basement, revealing that they tried to help him. Harold believed the group was bullying him, leading to his death in an accidental fire. The friends hide Slappy's remains. In the present, the children rationalize that their parents were not at fault and Harold needed help, upsetting "Bratt," who believes the parents murdered him. Bratt sheds his appearance and reveals himself as Harold to the horrified friends.
7	7	"Give Yourself Goosebumps"	Félix Enríquez Alcalá	Hilary Winston	October 27, 2023
The group realizes they have been trapped in the scrapbook along with the real Mr. Bratt because Harold drew them in. Nora is released from the hospital and confronted by Harold. She flees and recovers the dummy's parts, intending to take them to her mountain cabin. She is tailed by Harold. Ben and Eliza investigate her family's mine to find that Slappy's remains really are missing. They are attacked by one of James' Dupes and realize that Nora was right about Harold. In the purgatory Biddle house, the group finds another one of Harold's memories. Mr. Bratt discovers that being hit temporarily brings him back to his body in the real world. The friends try to have him return long enough for him to write them a way out of the scrapbook, but Bratt struggles with Harold for control. Harold throws the scrapbook into a puddle. As the drawings are watered down, so is the world inside the scrapbook, and the group promptly falls through the melted floor.
8	8	"You Can't Scare Me"	David Grossman	Nick Adams	November 3, 2023
The friends fall through the pages as the scrapbook disintegrates. They meet Harold's parents' spirits, waiting for Harold so the family can move on together. Bratt manages to draw the group a way out. They escape and rush to find Nora. Harold takes back control of Bratt, knocks out Nora on the mountain, and retrieves Slappy. The children are joined by all of their parents, who are themselves looking for Nora. Lucas and Margot find Nora uninjured, but Isaiah slips off a cliff edge, hanging on for life. Just as Harold is about to kill him, everyone arrives and pleads with him, apologizing. Slappy tries to hold his influence but Margot breaks through to Harold by telling him that his parents are waiting and they forgive him. Harold rescues Isaiah before throwing Slappy down the cliff. His spirit leaves Bratt's body and he joins his parents in the afterlife, at peace. As everyone believes it's over, Slappy, in pieces at the bottom of the cliff, opens his eyes.
9	9	"Night of the Living Dummy: Part 2"	Erin O'Malley	Mariko Tamaki	November 10, 2023
Months later, everyone is trying to move on from Harold Biddle's haunting. Margot's mother invites her to move to Seattle so the children go for a weekend trip to discover the city. Lucas finds it more difficult than the others to move on from their ordeal. He breaks up with Margot, envisioning that their life goals are different, and returns home. Bratt writes a book inspired by the ordeal, his dream being to become a published author. When a New York publisher is interested but wants him to change the ending to expand on Slappy, Bratt struggles with writer's block and his burdening financial problems. He retrieves Slappy's remains for inspiration. Slappy leads him to retrieve Kanduu's coffin buried near the Biddle House, promising him an ending. Bratt reads the spell inside, which frees Kanduu's spirit from the Slappy dummy and revives his human body, revealing him to be a magician. Ben arrives and Kanduu turns him into a puppet.
10	10	"Welcome to Horrorland"	David Grossman	Rob Letterman & Nicholas Stoller	November 17, 2023
A flashback reveals how Kanduu, who was once a human serving as a lieutenant in the British Army, was mortally wounded during a battle on foreign soil and stumbled upon a cave with mysterious inscriptions in the local language carved into its walls that granted granted him immortality upon sounding them out. Several years later, Kanduu meets a puppet maker and ventriloquist named Franz Mahar at his failing carnival and promises to turn his struggling carnival into a widely recognized and successful business in exchange for Franz building him a massive wooden spiral tower-like structure for a dark ritual involving human sacrifice. Another year later, he delivers human puppets to Mahar and in return wants a perfect dummy. Mahar instead traps him in the dummy using a magical spell. In the present day, Kanduu captures the residents of Port Lawrence, including Lucas, and turns them into living dummies. Returning from Seattle, Isaiah admits his feelings to Margot. Kanduu then captures the group and explains to the teens that he plans to use this ancient sorcery to ritualistically sacrifice 1,000 people on the spire, which will unleash unspeakable monsters, ghosts, ghouls, zombies, demons, curses and every other kind of horror known to mankind upon this realm. Kanduu claims that in the presence of absolute true horrors, humanity will be forced to stop wars among themselves. The group fights with Kanduu using magic. Margot finds the spell that saved Kanduu and reverses it, making him human again. The souls of his past victims rise up to drag him to hell, but not before he shoots at Margot. Isaiah jumps to save her but is shot instead and ends up in critical condition in the hospital. The doctor explains that Isaiah is going to die. Margot enters the hospital room and admits to an unconscious Isaiah that she shares his feelings. She then uses Kaandu's journal containing all his magical spells to revive Isaiah. In the final shot, Nathan goes to the hospital bathroom to wash his face and sees Kanduu's smiling face in the mirror instead of his own reflection.

=== Season 2: The Vanishing (2025) ===
No. overall	No. in season	Title	Directed by	Written by	Original release date
11	1	"Stay Out of the Basement, Part I"	Rob Letterman	Hilary Winston & Rob Letterman	January 10, 2025
In 1994, a group of teens go to the fort on the other side of Brooklyn. With the group unaware, Matty's brother, Anthony, joins them inside. Matty suddenly gets affected by monster dust and dies. In 2024, CeCe and her twin brother, Devin, go to Brooklyn to visit their dad, Anthony, for the summer. He is excited to see his kids but tells CeCe and Devin not to go to the basement. The twins decide to eat out to celebrate. After the dinner, Anthony sees Jen, Matty's former girlfriend in her car and talks to her, who gives him Matty's jacket from the night of his death. Later, they go to a pharmacy, but when Alex comes in, they immediately get kicked out. Later at night, the twins go to the park to meet their friends. Devin learns that his crush, Frankie, has a boyfriend named Trey, the neighbor from across the street. The friends talk about the alleged haunted place (where Matty died), and to impress Frankie, Devin tries to act brave by going to the fort where his uncle died. To scare him, Trey turns off the power. Devin sees an apparition of his uncle and gets affected by the monster dust but doesn't die. He somehow escapes and CeCe soon helps him out. Frankie gets mad at Trey, while Anthony discovers the dust on Matty's jacket. The dust turns into vines that connects with Anthony. Devin gets pulled into the sewers by the same vines and gets affected by the same dust. Devin comes to his senses and forgets how he reached there.
12	2	"Stay Out of the Basement, Part II"	Rob Letterman	Hilary Winston & Rob Letterman	January 10, 2025
Anthony realizes there is a parasite (Monster) in his arm. He gets it out and contains it in the basement freezer. Devin and Anthony go to the hospital to see Devin's grandma. Devin's grandma turns out to have issues about Matty's death. Anthony smashes Trey's car window. Trey plans to have revenge that day. That night, Trey is about to break into the basement, but Frankie tries, in vain, to stop him before leaving. Trey breaks into the basement, opens the freezer, and gets eaten by the monster. Frankie goes into the basement and sees a monster version of Trey. After the monster chases Frankie, it corners her at Trey's father dealership, where Devin saves Frankie. Frankie smashes Trey with his broken car. Trey's spirit goes into his car and becomes the haunted car.
13	3	"The Haunted Car"	Erin O'Malley	Brian Otaño	January 10, 2025
A year ago, Alex and the teens were testing out fireworks but accidentally burned the building and left her. Alex is sent to juvie. In the present day, Trey is known to be missing. Alex "borrows" Trey's car. As CeCe is heading to debate camp, Alex begs her to come with her. The car starts to activate by itself, resulting in CeCe getting out of it. The car nearly drives Alex to her death, but she gets into the trunk and jumps out. The car lands the ocean, resulting in Trey's spirit going to the fort. Anthony goes to the fort and finds Trey. Alex and Jen rush back home. Jen gets a call from Anthony.
14	4	"Monster Blood"	Gillian Robespierre	John Mahone	January 10, 2025
A month ago, CeCe meets with her high achieving friends, before going to see her debate coach, who tells her she didn't get into debate camp. In the present day, CeCe prepares for a meeting with Cathrine Boscow from Brown. On her way she runs into Alex, who returns her kombucha cup with the haunted particles in it. Meanwhile Frankie and Devin are at the hospital where Trey is catatonic, and a doctor comes in to examine Trey. CJ runs into that doctor in the hospital who tells him she doesn't work there. CeCe goes to the interview which is ruined when she gets a nosebleed. CeCe ends up at her mothers apartment, although she doesn't remember how she got there, and vomits up more black liquid. A blob starts coming out of the sink and chases CeCe out of the apartment, catching up to her, Devin and Frankie on the train. CeCe escapes it by electrocuting it in a tunnel and having its solid mass shattered by a train. Jen interviews Trey in the hospital but he doesn't remember anything, while Devin, Frankie and CeCe return to Fort Jerome, where they see Anthony leaving in a hazmat suit.
15	5	"The Boy Who Cried Monster" (Note: Disney+ and Hulu list the title of the fifth episode as "The Boy Who Cried Monster", while the official Goosebumps series Instagram account first advertised it as "Boy Who Cried Monster".)	Oz Rodriguez	James Eagan	January 10, 2025
CJ recounts a scary story to his younger sister, explaining why he didn’t make his last delivery. His mother tells him to show some more responsibility. He heads off to deliver soup to Anthony. While there however, Anthony’s eye falls out of his head. Anthony discovers there was a small tear in his hazmat suit from the previous episode. Meanwhile, Devin meets a mysterious girl named Hannah in the park and Trey is released from the hospital. CJ returns to the Brewer house with his mom, but Anthony seems fine when they arrive. CJ is fired. Anthony then calls CJ and tells him to come back so he can explain. However, when CJ arrives, Anthony has no memory of calling him. Anthony then kidnaps CJ. In the park, Hannah suddenly disappears after Devin takes a call from Frankie. Anthony, seemingly not in his right mind, tries to force CJ to drink black goo, but is saved by Frankie, Trey, and CeCe. The kids escape the house, taking a mysterious tape that had been dropped off by Jen, and the mysterious woman from the hospital shows up and takes Anthony’s body away.
16	6	"The Girl Next Door" (Note: Disney+ and Hulu list the title of the sixth episode as "The Girl Next Door", while the official Goosebumps series Instagram account first advertised it as "The Ghost Next Door".)	Eduardo Sánchez	Mariko Tamaki	January 10, 2025
The mysterious woman talks with Anthony's severed head and explains that she is speeding up the process that is turning his body into black goo. Elsewhere, the teens, now including Devin, meet up with Alex, who changes her mind about getting involved. The group plans to go watch the tape at the nursing home, but Devin suddenly feels the urge to go meet Hannah in the park. He heads off in the opposite direction. The group watch the tape, which shows a series of scenes of normal life leading up to the disappearance of Matty. One of the girls on the tape is revealed to be Hannah. The tapes end with Hannah being dragged underground by some kind of monster. Meanwhile, Devin meets up with Hannah in the park, and using some kind of hypnosis, she leads him to the Fort and tries to make him jump off the ledge. He is saved by Trey, and Hannah dispels into black mist. The teens all return the house to find Anthony gone and realize the mysterious woman has abducted him. Meanwhile, we see Anthony re-materialize in a pod.
17	7	"Welcome to Camp Nightmare"	Gillian Robespierre	Ben Epstein	January 10, 2025
The episode starts with a flashback to the fort while it was a camp, showing what happened to the counselor who disappeared. The source of the monster is revealed to be a spaceship that crashed at the fort. The group discover the identity of the mysterious woman, Ramona Pamani, and track down her laboratory. They discover research notes that reveal something called The Orion Project. We then flashback to 1969, where we see a group of scientists receive numbered code names. Ramona and her father head up the project, where they attempt to make a serum to break down the pods and revive anyone inside. The counselor is revealed to be podded. Finally creating a successful serum, Ramona’s father decides they are going to use it to deactivate the ship. However, the Counselor wakes up and transforms, reactivating the ship. Ramona is the only one to escape. Back in the present, the teens decide to go into the fort to rescue their dad.
18	8	"Invasion of the Body Squeezers"	Rob Letterman	Hilary Winston & Rob Letterman	January 10, 2025
The teens successfully rescue their dad, though when trying to escape, the podded teens from 1994 are also miraculously revived. With the everyone reunited, Anthony and Jen head off to confront Ramona about the harm she has caused all these years only to discover that she has also revived her father. However, it is revealed that after being podded for so long, he is not himself anymore. Vomiting a goop similar to the Monster Blood from episode 4, he transforms into an alien monster. Meanwhile, the four teens from 1994 are restless and everyone splits up so they can all get some air. In turn each of them also transforms and CJ, Trey, Frankie, Alex, Devin, and CeCe are all captured. Anthony and Jen decide to join forces to save the kids. Opening the secret hatch, the ship recollects goo from the pods and monsters, before shooting into the sky and emitting a bright light. Anthony has a vision of his brother, finally saying goodbye. He then wakes up to Jen telling him everyone is saved. A while later, everyone bids farewell to CeCe and Devin. A final shot shows Trey throwing up something covered in black goo.

== Production ==
Release poster

=== Development ===
In 2020, during the COVID-19 pandemic, Goosebumps (2015) producers approached director Rob Letterman with the idea of making a TV series based on the Goosebumps book series. Excited at the idea of working on a television show, Letterman accepted and approached longtime collaborator Nicholas Stoller to develop the series with him, which he ultimately agreed due to both his relationship with Letterman and an interest in developing horror-oriented material.

On April 28, 2020, it was announced that a live action reboot TV series of the Goosebumps franchise was in the works by Scholastic Entertainment, Sony Pictures Television and Neal H. Moritz's production company Original Film, which produced both the 2015 film and its sequel. In March 2021, R.L. Stine stated that the series had found a producer and a director. On February 4, 2022, it was reported that Disney+ had picked up the show, giving it a 10-episode order. Rob Letterman returned from the 2015 film (from Sony Pictures Animation) to direct the pilot, as well as write and serve as executive producer on the series with Nicholas Stoller. The series was partially produced via Zoom calls due to the industry-wide lockdown during the pandemic.

In October 2023, producers Conor Welch and Pavun Shetty expressed interest in developing additional seasons that adapted additional Goosebumps books, with Shetty in particular expressing interest in exploring elements from the Night of the Living Dummy books in season 2. On February 10, 2024, the series was renewed for an eight-episode second season and was set to focus on a different cast and storyline. On August 7, 2025, Disney+ canceled the series after two seasons.

=== Casting ===
In October 2022, Justin Long, Ana Yi Puig, Miles McKenna, Will Price, Zack Morris, Isa Briones and Rachael Harris were cast to star in the series. In January 2023, Rob Huebel was added to the cast in a recurring guest star role.

Goosebumps author R. L. Stine makes a voice cameo in "Night of the Living Dummy Part 2" as the host of the podcast Let the Write One In. Stoller and Letterman originally planned for Stine to have a physical cameo, but plans were discarded due to Stine's unavailability, after which showrunner Hilary Winston and co-executive producer James Egan pitched the idea of Stine voicing a podcast host instead. In March 2024, David Schwimmer, Ana Ortiz, Sam McCarthy, Jayden Bartels, Elijah Cooper, Galilea La Salvia, and Francesca Noel were cast as series regulars for the second season. In May 2024, Arjun Athalye, Eloise Payet, Christopher Paul Richards, Kyra Tantao, Stony Blyden, and Sakina Jaffrey joined the cast in recurring roles.

David Schwimmer was cast in the second season as he had wanted to pursue horror. As the father of a teenager, he became interested in the franchise. He wanted to instill as much drama in the character as possible and consulted with Letterman and Winston.

=== Filming ===
Principal photography began in October 2022 in Vancouver and was expected to end in March 2023, with Stephen McNutt and Thomas Yatsko serving as cinematographers. In February 2023, filming also occurred at Whistler Olympic Park. At the behest of Letterman, the series made strong use of practical effects, which he felt allowed the series' scarier elements to "feel grounded" and "real". The production team focused on making sure the effects looked realistic, as they wanted audiences to feel as invested as the characters were with the series' events.

=== Post-production ===
Christopher S. Capp and Tuan Quoc Le serve as editors on the series.

== Release ==
Goosebumps debuted on Friday, October 13, 2023, on Disney+ and Hulu. Five episodes from the ten-part series debuted as part of the streamers' annual "Hallowstream" and "Huluween" celebrations. New episodes followed every week thereafter until November 17, when the first season concluded. Additionally, the series' first two episodes aired October 13 on Freeform as part of "31 Nights of Halloween." The entire first season was scheduled to air on the network on October 25, 2024. The second season titled Goosebumps: The Vanishing was released on Disney+ and Hulu on January 10, 2025, consisting of eight episodes.

== Reception ==
=== Audience viewership ===
According to the streaming aggregator JustWatch, Goosebumps was the seventh most watched television series across all platforms in the United States during the week of October 9–15, 2023, and the third during the week of October 16–22, 2023. According to the streaming aggregator Reelgood, Goosebumps was the ninth most watched program across all platforms in the United States during the week of October 12, 2023. According to Whip Media's TV Time, Goosebumps was the eighth most watched original series across all platforms in the United States during the week of October 22, 2023, and the seventh during the week of October 29, 2023.

=== Critical response ===
For the first season, the review aggregator website Rotten Tomatoes reported an approval rating of 74% with an average rating of 6.8/10, based on 39 critic reviews. The website's critics consensus reads "Wickedly inventive enough to give viewers the creeps if not nightmares, Goosebumps solidly transplants R.L. Stine's spooky stories into a serialized format." Metacritic, which uses a weighted average, assigned a score of 60 out of 100 based on 12 critics, indicating "mixed or average" reviews.

The second season has a 77% approval rating on Rotten Tomatoes, based on 13 critic reviews with an average rating of 6.2/10. On Metacritic, it has a weighted average score of 65 out of 100 based on 5 critics, indicating "generally favorable" reviews.

=== Accolades ===
Award	Date of ceremony	Category	Recipient(s)	Result	Ref.
Artios Awards	February 12, 2025	Live Action Children & Family Series	Nicole Abellera Hallman, Jeanne McCarthy, Tara David (Associate Casting Director)	Nominated	
Children's and Family Emmy Awards	March 12, 2025	Outstanding Young Teen Series	Caitlin Friedman, Rob Letterman, Iole Lucchese, Neal H. Moritz, Kevin Murphy, Erin O'Malley, Pavun Shetty, Nicholas Stoller, Conor Welch, Hilary Winston (executive producers); Nick Adams, James Eagan (co-executive producers); Courtney Perdue, Baindu Saidu (supervising producers); Justis Greene, Paul M. Leonard, Franklin Jin Rho (producers); Adrian Cox (co-producer)	Nominated	
Children's and Family Emmy Awards	March 12, 2025	Outstanding Lead Performer in a Preschool, Children's or Young Teen Program	Justin Long	Nominated	
Children's and Family Emmy Awards	March 12, 2025	Outstanding Writing for a Young Teen Program	Rob Letterman and Nicholas Stoller (for "Say Cheese and Die")	Nominated	
Children's and Family Emmy Awards	March 12, 2025	Outstanding Directing for a Single Camera Program	Rob Letterman (for "Say Cheese and Die")	Nominated	
Children's and Family Emmy Awards	March 12, 2025	Outstanding Stunt Coordination for a Live Action Program	Goosebumps	Nominated	
Children's and Family Emmy Awards	March 12, 2025	Outstanding Makeup and Hairstyling	Goosebumps	Nominated	
Children's and Family Emmy Awards	March 12, 2025	Outstanding Editing for a Single Camera Program	Goosebumps	Nominated	
Children's and Family Emmy Awards	March 12, 2025	Outstanding Sound Mixing and Sound Editing for a Live Action Program	Goosebumps	Nominated	
Children's and Family Emmy Awards	March 12, 2025	Outstanding Visual Effects for a Live Action Program	Goosebumps	Nominated	
Children's and Family Emmy Awards	March 1–2, 2026	Outstanding Young Teen Series	TBA	Nominated	
Children's and Family Emmy Awards	March 1–2, 2026	Outstanding Lead Performer	David Schwimmer	Nominated	
Children's and Family Emmy Awards	March 1–2, 2026	Outstanding Writing for a Young Teen Program	Hilary Winston & Rob Letterman for "Stay Out of the Basement, Part I"	Nominated	
Children's and Family Emmy Awards	March 1–2, 2026	Outstanding Directing for a Live Action Series	Rob Letterman for "Stay Out of the Basement, Part I"	Nominated	
Children's and Family Emmy Awards	March 1–2, 2026	Outstanding Art Direction/Set Decoration/Scenic Design	TBA for "Welcome to Camp Nightmare	Nominated	
Children's and Family Emmy Awards	March 1–2, 2026	Outstanding Casting for a Live-Action Program	TBA	Nominated	
Children's and Family Emmy Awards	March 1–2, 2026	Outstanding Music Direction and Composition for a Live Action Program	TBA for "Welcome to Camp Nightmare	Nominated	
Children's and Family Emmy Awards	March 1–2, 2026	Outstanding Show Open	TBA	Nominated	
Children's and Family Emmy Awards	March 1–2, 2026	Outstanding Sound Mixing and Sound Editing for a Live Action Program	TBA for "The Girl Next Door"	Nominated	
Children's and Family Emmy Awards	March 1–2, 2026	Outstanding Visual Effects for a Live Action Program	TBA	Nominated	
Directors Guild of America Awards	February 10, 2024	Children's Programs	Rob Letterman (for "Say Cheese and Die")	Nominated	
Hollywood Makeup Artist and Hair Stylist Guild Awards	February 18, 2024	Best Makeup - Children and Teen Television Programming	Zabrina Wanjiru Matiru, Werner Pretorius, Krista Hann, and Felix Fox	Nominated	
Nickelodeon Kids' Choice Awards	July 13, 2024	Favorite Family TV Show	Goosebumps	Nominated	
Nickelodeon Kids' Choice Awards	July 13, 2024	Favorite Male TV Star (Family)	Justin Long	Nominated	
Nickelodeon Kids' Choice Awards	July 13, 2024	Favorite Male TV Star (Family)	Zack Morris	Nominated	
Nickelodeon Kids' Choice Awards	June 21, 2025	Favorite Family TV Show	Goosebumps: The Vanishing	Nominated	
Nickelodeon Kids' Choice Awards	June 21, 2025	Favorite Male TV Star (Family)	David Schwimmer	Nominated	
Nickelodeon Kids' Choice Awards	June 21, 2025	Favorite Male TV Star (Family)	Sam McCarthy	Nominated	
Nickelodeon Kids' Choice Awards	June 21, 2025	Favorite Female TV Star (Family)	Jayden Bartels	Nominated	
Producers Guild of America Awards	February 25, 2024	Outstanding Children's Program	Goosebumps	Nominated	
Writers Guild of America Awards	April 14, 2024	Children's Episodic, Long Form and Specials	Rob Letterman and Nicholas Stoller (for "Say Cheese and Die")	Nominated	
