= Goosebumps Most Wanted =

Book series by R.L. Stine

Goosebumps Most Wanted is a line of Goosebumps books by author R.L. Stine, described as "a brand new take on terror."

== Description ==
This line features a new recurring story arc, the 4th since the two-arc Goosebumps HorrorLand and Goosebumps Hall of Horrors. Featuring the return of several of the series' most infamous villains, the new series launched in October 2012.

"The infamous, Most Wanted Goosebumps characters are out on the loose and they're coming after you! There is no place to hide. Nothing is safe!" "Catch the most wanted Goosebumps characters--undead or alive..."

== Books ==
#	Title	Original published date	Pages	ISBN
01	Planet of the Lawn Gnomes	October 1, 2012	125	0-545-41798-8
Jay Gardner is a mischievous kid who can't stay out of trouble. Unfortunately, Jay gets in so much trouble, his family is forced to move. But there's something odd about Jay's new town. Why does everyone have lawn gnomes in front of their homes? And why is everyone afraid to go outside at night? Jay is about to learn that mischief can lead to terror.
02	Son of Slappy	January 1, 2013	134	0-545-41799-6
Jackson Stander is every parent's dream. He doesn't get into trouble, he always does his homework, and he never ever lies. His teachers all trust him completely. He even volunteers at the local Youth Center. But that was all before Jackson came across an evil ventriloquist dummy. Now he must deal with Slappy and the son of Slappy as they wreak havoc on his family and friends. Jackson will soon see that two Slappys are not better than one!
03	How I Met My Monster	April 1, 2013	140	0-545-41800-3
Night for Noah Bienstock is a scary time. He keeps having the scariest dream that he's being hunted by a monster and can't escape. Daytime isn't much better for Noah, a shy, lonely 6th grader. But then Noah meets Monroe, the new kid in town. Monroe is assigned the seat next to Noah in school and they instantly hit it off. But there are some strange things about Monroe. Can he trust Monroe with the details of his dream? Noah must do whatever it takes to make sure his nightmares don't come true!
04	Frankenstein's Dog	July 30, 2013	136	0-545-41801-1
Kat is reluctant to visit her Uncle Vic Frankenstein because of all the rumors about him. People in the small town where he lives say he's a mad scientist like his great-grandfather Victor Frankenstein who created a monster that came alive and terrorized the town. But Kat is relieved to find that even though he lives in a dark, old castle-like mansion, Uncle Vic is a quiet, gentle man, a scientist interested in building robots with artificial intelligence. Also, Kat loves Poochie, Vic's small, adorable, fluffy white dog, funny and playful. But after an accident occurs in her uncle's lab, strange things begin to happen. Has Kat created a monster? Or is something else responsible for the horror that is unleashed?
05	Dr. Maniac Will See You Now	September 24, 2013	136	0-545-41802-X
The Most Wanted list continues with Dr. Maniac, the strangest doctor of them all. When a group of comic book characters appear in the real world, twelve-year-old Richard Dreezer must track down Dr. Maniac to save the day.
06	Creature Teacher: The Final Exam	February 25, 2014	133	0-545-62773-7
It doesn't take long for Tommy to find out he's in big trouble. His whole family is obsessed with winning and he's being sent off to a special camp to help make him into a "winner." When Tommy gets there, he sees that something isn't right. All of the kids are so competitive. It's almost like their lives depend on it. It does when the counselor is Mrs. Maaargh who plans to eat the worst loser. Can Tommy survive The Final Exam so that he can't be eaten by Mrs. Maaargh?
07	A Nightmare on Clown Street	February 24, 2015	160	0-545-62774-5
Ray Gordon really likes the circus. His uncle Theo is a performer in Koko Klown Academy and he invites Ray to come join him for the summer. At first, Ray's parents are reluctant-they know their son has a habit of getting himself into strange situations. But Ray manages to convince them that he'll be on his best behavior. The circus itself is very cool. The clowns stay in their makeup all day and only go by their clown names. Ray becomes a clown-in-training named Mr. Belly-Bounce. But the longer he's there, the scarier things become. There are whisperings about a place called Clown Street and nobody, including Murder the Clown, wants to go there. Will Ray be able to survive the dark secrets of the circus?
08	Night of the Puppet People	September 29, 2015	160	0-545-62775-3
Twins Ben and Jenny are horrified by a puppet show at their fifth birthday party. More than seven years later, their friend Jesse finds a group of puppets in the attic and plans a puppet show at school. However, as the three are practicing for the show, the puppets act and move on their own, and the three start acting strangely.
09	Here Comes the Shaggedy	February 23, 2016	160	0-545-82547-4
A scientist father moves his two children to Florida, where they come across a swamp monster known as The Shaggedy.
10	Lizard of Oz	September 27, 2016	160	0-545-82549-0
Katie Orton loves animals, especially unusual ones. So when she sees a pop-up ad on her computer for an amazing lizard from Australia, she has to have it. The ad says the lizard is actually a kind of chameleon--it can change its color to blend in with its surroundings. But what makes this lizard really strange is that it's a copycat--the ad says it can even change its shape. Kate's parents don't believe all the claims in the ad, but they tell her to go ahead and order it. They tell her not to be disappointed if it's just a plain old lizard. After anxiously checking the mail every day for two weeks, the package finally arrives. But when she finally opens it--there's no lizard inside. There's only an egg with a written warning. Is Katie ready for what's about to hatch? Note: This is final book of the "Goosebumps Most Wanted" series.
Special Edition
01	Zombie Halloween	June 25, 2014	174	0-545-62776-1
Kenny Manzetti was the new kid in town. His family moved back into an old house to help take care of his grandfather. Everyone in his new neighborhood is obsessed with zombies--even Grandpa Mo. But then a new family moves in next door and their choice in furniture is... interesting. Kenny is convinced that there is something strange about the new neighbors but his parents won't listen to him. So Kenny and his friends go in for a closer look. A bad idea on any day but definitely the wrong choice around Halloween. Will Kenny survive long enough to go trick-or-treating?
02	The 12 Screams of Christmas	September 30, 2014	192	0-545-62777-X
Kate Welles doesn't want to be special. She just wants to play the lead in her school's Christmas play. Her annoying "friend" Courtney is constantly getting in the way of that. Can you even call someone a "friend" if all they do is make fun of you and ruin everything all of the time? But Kate has to get along with Courtney or else neither of them will be allowed to take part in The 12 Screams of Christmas. Kate and Courtney's teacher decides they need to find a special place to rehearse. A certain house with a special history. The kind of place that Kate would normally be pretty frightened to go into. The kind of place that gives new meaning to the term "Christmas Spirit".
03	Trick or Trap	July 28, 2015	174	0-545-62778-8
At their Halloween bash in an old haunted house, Amanda and Scott create several traps for bullies at school. However, the haunted house has different plans and prefers to set its own traps.
04	The Haunter	June 26, 2016	174	0-545-82545-8
Sammy Baker, 12, is a quiet kid who wishes he wasn't so shy and timid. He is frightened but eager to prove he can be brave. On Halloween night, he follows his friends to the Marple House, an abandoned mansion on the edge of the woods. It's rumored a whole family died in the house many years before, and everyone knows there are ghosts there. Just past midnight, he feels a cold tingle at the back of his neck. The cold seeps down, a heavy chill he has never felt before. Soon, his whole head feels like a block of ice. He's about to scream-but the cold feeling vanishes. He realizes the others are watching him-because he's panting so frantically. Sammy doesn't realize that his body has been invaded by a ghost known as The Haunter. The Haunter takes over Sammy's brain and gives him instructions that he has to obey. But The Haunter's commands become more and more dangerous. And then life-threatening. And to his horror, Sammy realizes The Haunter's goal-to metamorphose Sammy into a ghost, too!
