= Gooflumps =

1995 book series by Tom Hughes

- Cover for Stay Out of the Bathroom
- Stay Out of the Bathroom; Eat Cheese and Barf!
- Author: Tom Hughes (as R.U. Slime)
- Country: United States
- Language: English
- Genre: Parody; Horror
- Publisher: Random House
- Published: 1995
- Media type: Print (hardback & paperback)

Gooflumps is a two-part parody book series written in 1995 by Tom Hughes under the pseudonym of R. U. Slime. The books are parodies of the Goosebumps series by R. L. Stine. Both books were released simultaneously in 1995 by Random House. Each book had a tongue-in-cheek author's photo of Hughes upside down with wild, unkempt hair as "R.U. Slime".

== The books ==
- Stay Out of the Bathroom
- Eat Cheese and Barf!

The books are completely unlinked in their storylines, but both books featured three taglines on their covers:

- Buy 2 - that's it!
- This spoof is just a goof!
- Warning! Not a Goosebumps book

Despite the similarity in writing and the title spoofs, the books were not actual parodies of any particular Goosebumps books, only parodying the writing style of R. L. Stine.

=== Stay Out of the Bathroom (Gooflumps Book 2 ½) ===
This book's title is a parody of Stay Out of the Basement, although the book itself is more similar to Let's Get Invisible!. Stay out of the Bathroom centers on a young boy named Joe Kohler, a self-proclaimed "toilet king" who begins to experience strange things going on with his toilet, such as the lid slamming down on his head while he is vomiting, the toilet refusing to flush, and a trail of missing people leading directly to his bathroom. He soon discovers that the toilet is a teleportation device for sinister aliens visiting the Earth.

=== Eat Cheese and Barf! (Gooflumps Book 4 ½) ===
This book's title is a parody of Say Cheese and Die!, although the plot is more similar to Monster Blood. Eat Cheese and Barf! involves a young lactose-intolerant boy named Billy Fudder whose family has moved from Syracuse, New York to the rural town of Bledsoe, New York after inheriting a farm from his grandfather. The town thrives on the production of dairy products, which irritates Billy, as he is the only lactose-intolerant boy in the city, but this boring town has a secret: beneath his home is a creature made entirely of cottage cheese created by his grandfather, who was actually insane. His sister's one-armed boyfriend Armand the farmhand and his talking dairy cow Martha try to help them find a way to stop the monster, while he and his friend Fannie arrive at the local carnival where it has been released.
