= Jade Armor =

French animated TV series

- Genre: Superhero; Magical girl
- Created by: Corinne Kouper
- Based on: A creation by: Pongo Kuo; Two Tigers
- Developed by: Mary Bredin
- Written by: M.J. Offen (head writer)
- Directed by: Chloe Miller; Dennis Do
- Voices of: Marie-Pierre Journet; Elle Hallock; Jeremy Ang Jones; Jonathan Butler-Duplessis; Xavier Paul Cadeau; Jason Fong; Walles Hamonde; Jentel Hawkins; Lance Krul; Kate Liu; Morgan Lorraine; Jing Lusi; Jensen Olaya; Jasmine Putman; Jack Shaloo; Suraj Sharma; Anne Yatco; Ana Yi Puig
- Composers: Giacomo Lecchi D'Alessadro; Leonardo Rizzi
- Country of origin: France
- Original languages: French; English
- No. of seasons: 2
- No. of episodes: 52

Production
- Producer: Corinne Kouper
- Running time: 21 minutes
- Production company: TeamTO

Original release
- Network: Cartoon Network (EMEA); France 4 (France); Super RTL (Germany) CStar (France)
- Release: 7 September 2022 – present

Jade Armor is a French animated television series, produced by TeamTO, that premiered on 7 September 2022. It follows Lan Jun, a teenage girl who fights supervillains as the legendary superhero Jade Armor.

The series was renewed for a second season.

== Premise ==
A teenager named Lan Jun inherits the mantle of the mystical superhero Jade Armor. She must battle an array of supervillains, including the Crimson Lord, while dealing with the challenges of teenage life. She is aided by four beasticons, magical animals of legend.

== Characters ==
- Lan Jun Ye/Jade Armor (voiced by Elle Hallock) is the main character of the series. She lives with her father, grandmother, and great-grandmother. She has recently become the new Jade Armor.
- Alisha Gray (voiced by Justine Putmon) is one of Lan Jun's best friends.
- Theodore Khan is another of Lan Jun's best friends.
- The Crimson Lord is the primary antagonist.

== Development ==
The show is inspired by Chinese mythology. It was created by Chloe Miller and executive producer Corinne Kouper, based on a concept by M. Pongo Kuo. It was co-developed by Mary Bredin, with M.J. Offen as head writer and Ghislaine Pujol as story editor. French animation studio TeamTO began developing the series in 2011, with the pitch bible and scripts being rewritten several times during development.

The original concept for the show was an action series with a male protagonist. After Chloe Miller joined the show, Lan Jun, who was originally created as the male protagonist's best friend, became the main character. When creating Lan Jun, the showrunners wanted her to be an "ordinary girl" who was both feminine and strong, without relying on either gender's stereotypes or a "tomboy" archetype. Miller and Kouper also sought to add more comedic elements to the story and to focus more on family and heritage.

The series's inspirations include kung fu movies, magical girl anime, and superhero comics. The series is set in a fictional city inspired by Taiwan. A Chinese cultural consultant was hired to advise the showrunners on the representation of cultural elements such as kung fu. Offen commented that the creative team had "gone deep" on the characterization of side characters and villains. The show is intended for viewers in the 3- to 12-year-old age demographic.

The artistic style of Jade Armor was to have a "graphic and minimalist look". It is animated using 2D computer graphics, with sharp-edged linework designed by the series's artistic director Pierre Croco.

The series was co-directed by Denis Do, a Wushu martial arts practitioner. To help the storyboard artists visualize the fight scenes, the showrunners hired a stunt coordinator to film the action scenes on camera. Some stunts were performed by French kung fu martial artists. Miller said that the storyboard artists had to use their imagination to translate the stuntmen's work into the show's magical, "bigger than life" action sequences. The series's choreography was inspired by films such as Crouching Tiger, Hidden Dragon.

The show's producers had difficulty finding Asian voice actors, and voice actors who could dub the French series into other languages. As a result of the difficulty in finding voice actors with dubbing skills, TeamTO's École Cartoucherie Animation Solidaire partnered with Frog Box and Titrafilm to create a dubbing course.

TeamTO released a pitch bible and trailer at Kidscreen Summit in 2016.

The series's second season began development in June 2023.

== Episodes ==
Series	Episodes	Originally released	
Series	Episodes	First released	Last released
1	26	7 September 2022	30 November 2022
2	26	October 2025	2026

=== Season 1 (2022) ===
No.	Title	Original release date
1	"The Gift"	7 September 2022
Lan Jun learns that she is the new Jade Armor. There is a shard in the town's clock tower that is forcing her to relive her birthday over and over again.
2	"The Mess"	7 September 2022
Lan Jun suffers bad luck when she breaks a mirror that has a shard embedded in it. Even worse, the Crimson Lord is back.
3	"The Talk"	14 September 2022
Lan Jun's father, Liam, wants to reconnect with her. Meanwhile, the Crimson Lord uses a shard to steal everyone's voices.
4	"Eye of the Tiger"	14 September 2022
The town's Golden Dragon statue goes missing and Jade Armor is blamed for it.
5	"Rogue Beasticon"	21 September 2022
The beasticon Xinyan returns to Ban Tang to take revenge on the humans who hurt him and his fellow animals.
6	"Gravity"	21 September 2022
A Mahjong game gone wrong causes the town's gravity to go all topsy-turvy.
7	"Puppets"	28 September 2022
The Crimson Lord uses a shard to turn everyone in Ban Tang into his mindless puppets.
8	"Tiger Trouble"	28 September 2022
While Jade tries to save the townspeople from an amnesia-inducing fountain, Black Tiger kidnaps Baihu.
9	"Lips Are Sealed"	5 October 2022
A journal embedded with a shard starts revealing everyone's deepest secrets, making Lan Jun worry about her secret identity.
10	"Rise of Xinyan"	5 October 2022
Lan Jun gets shrunk to doll-size by a new shard, and the same shard makes Xinyan gigantic.
11	"The Show Must Go On"	12 October 2022
There's a school play and everyone is becoming great actors. It is discovered that a shard on a stage light is improving their acting. Theo doesn't want his play to fail; so, he does not tell anyone about the shard.
12	"The Kitty"	12 October 2022
A cat has a shard that switches people's bodies. Meanwhile the Crimson Lord and Lan Jun race to get the shard.
13	"The Catalyst"	19 October 2022
Black tiger suddenly has elemental abilities as Jade Armor, and Lan Jun is becoming stressed.
14	"The Skeleton Key"	19 October 2022
Lan Jun loses her grandma's lucky die after it is confiscated by her teacher. Kai helps her by using a key that sends you to any place imaginable. But the Crimson lord has come for the shard in the key and for Kai.
15	"The Perfume"	26 October 2022
A hypnosis perfume has a shard and Lan Jun is looking for it because it has a connection to her mom.
16	"Jade-Con"	26 October 2022
Jade Armor has a convention dedicated to her. It goes well, until everyone is locked inside, as a distraction, so the Crimson Lord can hunt for a shard.
17	"The Beastibot"	2 November 2022
The Crimson Lord now has a robot with the ability of his old beasticons, it is up to Lan Jun to defeat him.
18	"The Pomegranate"	2 November 2022
While walking with Kai, Lan Jun is hit by a shard pomegranate that sends her in another dimension with a few changes.
19	"Monkey Mind"	9 November 2022
Xinyan is back again with another plan for remaking an Animal kingdom.
20	"The Thread"	9 November 2022
A shard-effected thread makes Lan Jun become BFF with Pearl. Her identity as Jade Armor and Pearl's identity as Black Tiger's sidekick and daughter is in jeopardy.
21	"The Filter"	16 November 2022
A shard from the network power system makes emojis and filters become more realistic. The Crimson Lord has a plan to get the shard, Lan Jun, Theo and Alisha try to stop this.
22	"Jade Noir"	16 November 2022
A shard in the remote leads to a battle between Lan Jun, the Crimson Lord, and Xinyan to get it, but each channel the shard affects in the remote changes the channel's theme and affects real life.
23	"La Vie en Rose"	23 November 2022
Lan Jun is stressed by her test after she buys a pair of shard-affected shades. These cause her to become chill in any situation which makes the Crimson Lord almost win.
24	"Transparency"	23 November 2022
The Crimson Lord is still manipulating Kai. Meanwhile Lan Jun's mother's spirit is active in communicating with her with the help of her family, Theo, and Alisha.
25	"Crimson Moon"	30 November 2022
The eclipse is beginning and the Crimson Lord needs one more shard from his three to complete his armor. Meanwhile Kai is fully manipulated by the Crimson Lord. Lan Jun is stressed, and she has to perform ritual to bring back her mother before the eclipse ends.
26	"Jade Infinity"	30 November 2022
The eclipse has ended; the final battle between Jade Armor and the Crimson Lord has begun.

=== Season 2 (2025) ===
No. overall	No. in season	English Title French Title	Original release date
27	1	"Back to the Beginning" "Le retour de l'étrange"	October 2025
28	2	"A Sticky Situation" "Le chewing-gum"	TBA
29	3	"Wish you Were Here" "La carte postale"	TBA
30	4	"Armor of Darkness" "L'armure des ténèbres"	TBA
31	5	"Crimson Noodles" "Les nouilles spectrales"	TBA
32	6	"Jade Drama" "À fleur de peau"	TBA
33	7	"Attack of the 50-Foot Jade" "L'attaque des géants"	TBA
34	8	"My Own Worst Enemy" "Ma meilleure ennemie"	TBA
35	9	"The Diagnosis" "Le diagnostic"	TBA
36	10	"Man's Best Friend" "Le meilleur ami de l'homme"	TBA
37	11	"The Auction" "La vente aux enchères"	TBA
38	12	"The Cunning Fox" "Rusée comme une renarde"	TBA
39	13	"We Can be Heroes" "Nous sommes tous des héros"	TBA
40	14	"Cool Jade" "L'autre Jade"	TBA
41	15	"Interference" "L'interférence"	TBA
42	16	"The Election" "L'élection"	TBA
43	17	"The Bandage" "Même pas mal"	TBA
44	18	"The Internship" "Le stage"	TBA
45	19	"The Beasticon Sitter" "Le babysitting"	TBA
46	20	"The Trial" "Le procès"	TBA
47	21	"Bubble Trouble" "La bulle"	TBA
48	22	"On Lock" "Emprisonnés"	TBA
49	23	"Forget-Me-Not" "Le trou de mémoire"	TBA
50	24	"The Shard Magnet" "Les voleurs d'éclats"	TBA
51	25	"Jade Crimson" "Jade rouge"	TBA
52	26	"The Perfect Storm" "En pleine tempête"	TBA

== Broadcast ==
APC Kids distributes the series worldwide with the exception of China and the United States. The series is broadcast by HBO Max and Cartoon Network in Europe, the Middle East, and Africa; by France Télévisions in France; Super RTL in Germany; the Australian Broadcasting Corporation in Australia; and by the Family Channel, Télé-Québec, and Télémagino in Canada.
