= Goosebumps (film) =

2015 American film by Rob Letterman

- Theatrical release poster
- Directed by: Rob Letterman
- Screenplay by: Darren Lemke
- Story by: Scott Alexander; Larry Karaszewski
- Based on: Goosebumps by R. L. Stine
- Produced by: Deborah Forte; Neal H. Moritz
- Starring: Jack Black; Dylan Minnette; Odeya Rush; Amy Ryan; Ryan Lee; Jillian Bell
- Cinematography: Javier Aguirresarobe
- Edited by: Jim May
- Music by: Danny Elfman
- Production companies: Columbia Pictures; Sony Pictures Animation; LStar Capital; Village Roadshow Pictures; Original Film; Scholastic Entertainment Inc.
- Distributed by: Sony Pictures Releasing
- Release date: October 16, 2015
- Running time: 103 minutes
- Country: United States
- Language: English
- Budget: $58–84 million
- Box office: $158.3 million

Goosebumps is a 2015 American horror comedy film based on R. L. Stine's children's horror novel series. It was directed by Rob Letterman with a screenplay by Darren Lemke, from a story by Scott Alexander and Larry Karaszewski. The film stars Jack Black as a fictionalized version of Stine who, alongside his teenage daughter (Odeya Rush) and their new neighbor (Dylan Minnette), must save their hometown after all the monsters from the Goosebumps franchise escape from his works, wreaking havoc in reality. It additionally features Amy Ryan, Ryan Lee and Jillian Bell in supporting roles.

Development on a Goosebumps film adaptation began in the 1990s, but the project stalled. In early 2008, Columbia Pictures acquired the rights. Principal photography lasted from April to July 2014 in Candler Park, Atlanta.

Goosebumps was theatrically released in the United States on October 16, 2015. The film received positive reviews from critics, and grossed $158.3 million at the box office. A sequel titled Goosebumps 2: Haunted Halloween was released on October 12, 2018.

== Plot ==
Following his father's death, teenager Zach Cooper and his mother Gale move from New York City to Madison, Delaware, where the latter has a new job as its high school's vice-principal. Zach befriends neighbor Hannah and fellow student Champ. After getting to know the former, her father warns Zach to stay away from them.

That night, Zach hears a terrified scream coming from Hannah's house and believes she is in trouble. He calls the police to investigate, but her father convinces them that it was only surround sound as Gale leaves Zach with his aunt Lorraine while she supervises a school dance afterwards. Fearing Hannah is in danger, Zach tricks her father into visiting the police station while he and Champ infiltrate his house. The duo find locked manuscripts that catalog entries from the Goosebumps franchise; Zach unlocks the one cataloging The Abominable Snowman of Pasadena and its titular character emerges from it. Aided by Hannah, they track the beast to an ice rink, where her father re‑imprisons it in the manuscript.

Hannah's father is revealed to be R. L. Stine, the disturbed genius behind the Goosebumps franchise, who originally began it to cope with severe bullying, but the monsters escaped into reality due to his overactive imagination, forcing him to detain them in their manuscripts. Back at Stine's house, the quartet encounter the vengeful Slappy the Dummy, freed from his origin manuscript as he incinerates it, leaving no way to re‑imprison him, and escapes with the others.

As Slappy liberates his fellow monsters from them, causing havoc around Madison, Zach formulates a plan of recapturing the monsters by writing a single story, but it can only be done using Stine's supernatural typewriter on display at the school. En route, Zach witnesses Hannah becoming ghost-like in the moonlight and, at the school, Stine reveals to him that his "daughter" is actually Hannah Fairchild from The Ghost Next Door, whom he created to cope with loneliness, although Hannah herself is oblivious. Stine starts writing the story, based on the events around them, while Zach and Champ warn everyone as the building comes under attack.

As the monsters break into the school, Slappy finds Stine and injures his fingers before he can finish the story. The quartet travel to an abandoned amusement park to create a diversion, but Slappy tracks them down and subdues Stine using the eponymous blob from The Blob That Ate Everyone as the other monsters arrive. After the remaining three manage to finish the story, Zach hesitates to open its manuscript because Hannah will be caught in it as well, but Hannah reveals she knew the truth all along; she opens it, bidding farewell to Zach as she is re‑imprisoned along with the monsters.

Some time later, Stine begins working as a substitute teacher while starting a relationship with Lorraine. After class, he reveals to Zach that he brought Hannah back into reality by rewriting her origin book. As the couple leave together, Stine incinerates the copy, but then finds his typewriter writing by itself. To his horror, My Best Friend Is Invisible's Brent Green was omitted in the monsters' re‑imprisonment and now prepared to avenge himself.

== Cast ==
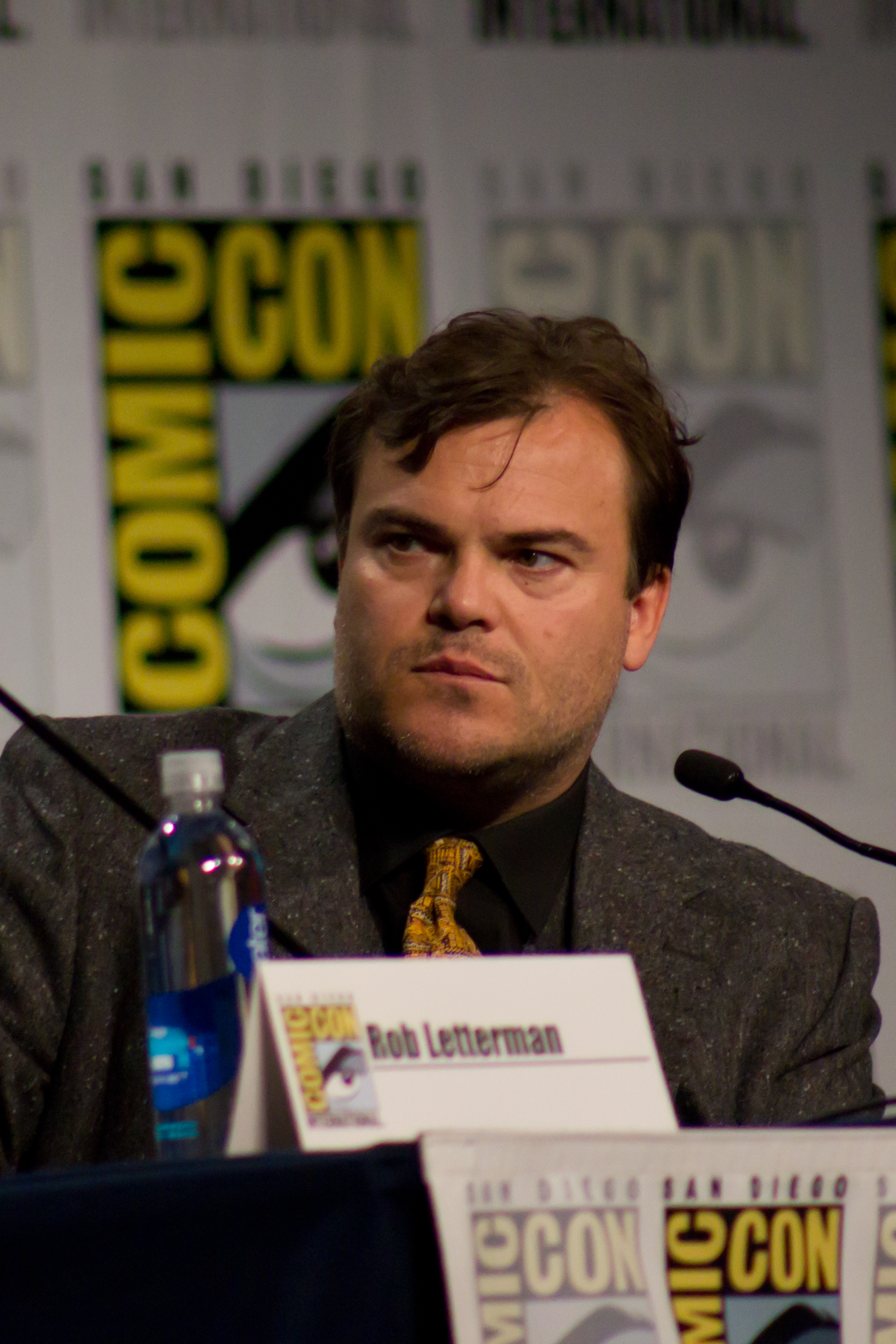
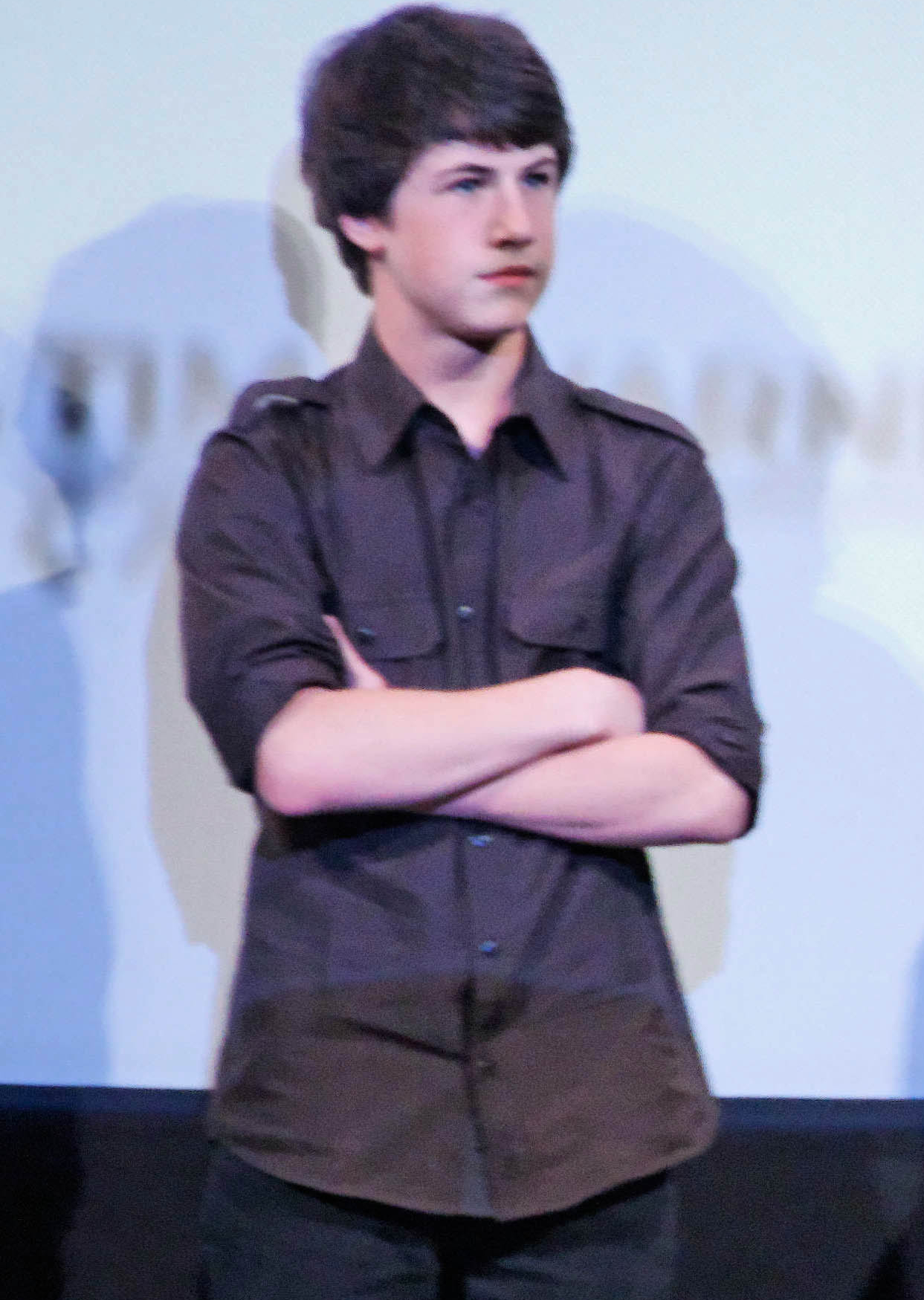
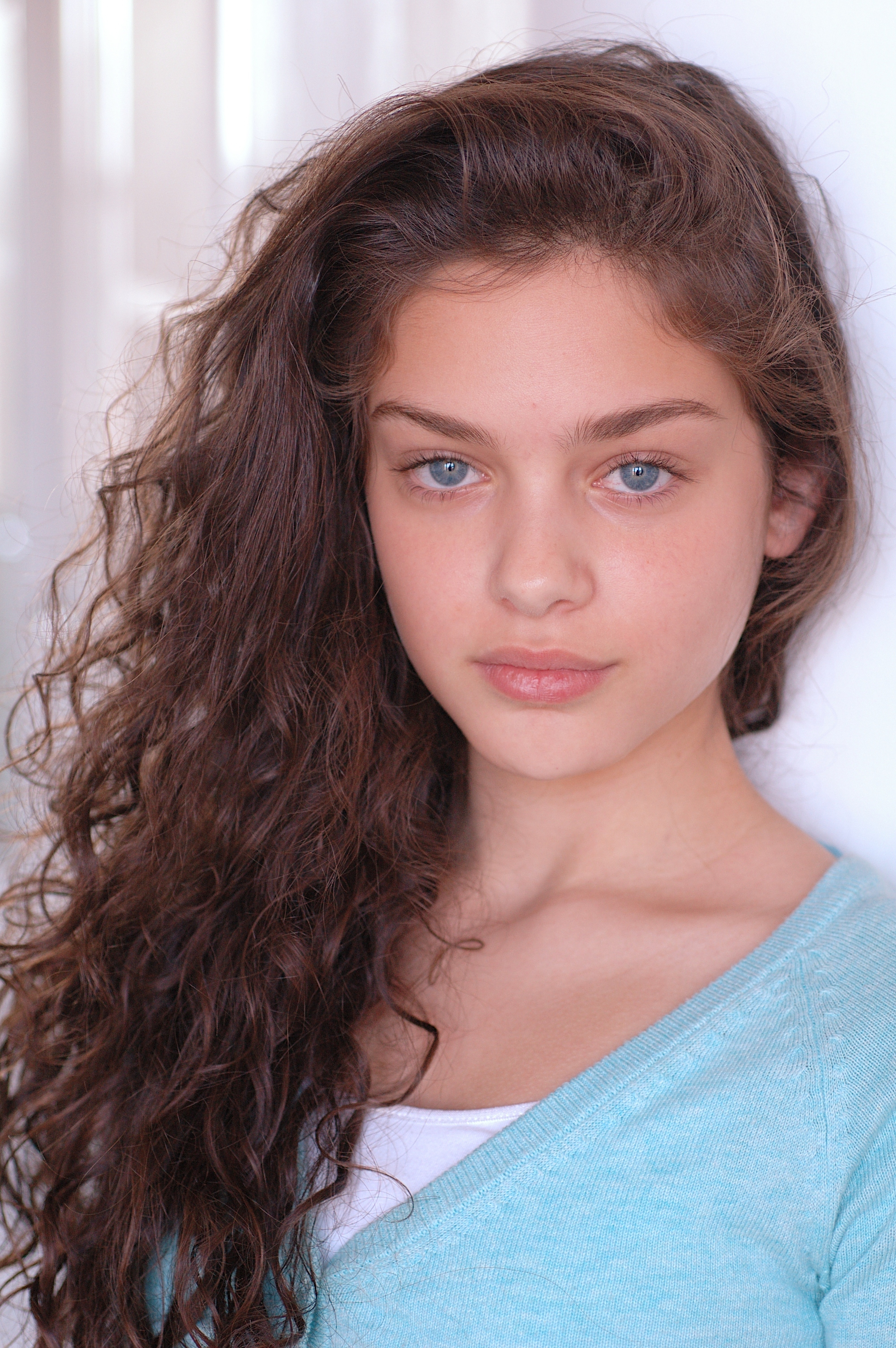
Jack Black, Dylan Minnette and Odeya Rush starred in the film as R. L. Stine, Zach Cooper and the former's daughter, Hannah, respectively.
- Jack Black as:
  - R.L. Stine, the disturbed genius behind the Goosebumps franchise who is attempting to conceal his identity.
  - The voice of Slappy the Dummy.
  - The voice of Brent Green, the eponymous invisible boy from My Best Friend Is Invisible.
  - Avery Lee Jones and Jake McKinnin additionally provided the former’s puppeteer work.
- Dylan Minnette as Zach Cooper, Stine's new neighbor
- Odeya Rush as Hannah Fairchild alias Hannah Stine, Stine's daughter who is actually the eponymous protagonist from The Ghost Next Door.
- Ryan Lee as Champ, one of Zach's classmates and his best friend
- Amy Ryan as Gale Cooper, Zach's widowed mother who has recently gotten a new job as Madison High School's vice-principal
- Jillian Bell as Lorraine Conyers, Gale's single sister and Zach's aunt who later starts a relationship with Stine
- Halston Sage as Taylor, a popular student at Madison High who Champ had a crush on and ends up being saved by him
- Steven Krueger as Davidson, another popular student and Taylor's ex-boyfriend
- Keith Arthur Bolden as Principal Garrison, Madison High's principal
- Amanda Lund as Officer A. Brooks, a police officer trainee partnered with Officer Stevens
- Timothy Simons as Officer G. Stevens, the local police officer and Brooks' mentor
- Ken Marino as Coach Carr, Madison High's physical education teacher who hits on Gale
- Karan Soni as Mr. Rooney, a teacher
- Caleb Emery as Mr. Boyd, another teacher who Stine substitutes for in the film's epilogue following his encounter with the giant mantis from A Shocker on Shock Street during the climax
- John Bernecker as the uncredited motion capture performance of Will Blake, the titular werewolf from The Werewolf of Fever Swamp.

The real R. L. Stine has a cameo role as Mr. Black, a play on the fact of how his caricature in the film is portrayed by Jack Black, Madison High's acting coach (credited as "Hallway Player").

Kumail Nanjiani and Luka Jones appear as a pair of movers who encounter Slappy in an alternate opening sequence featured on home media releases.

== Production ==
=== Development ===
In the mid-1990s, George A. Romero wrote a script for a film adaptation of R. L. Stine's first original Goosebumps book Welcome to Dead House. It was rejected and then kept at the University of Pittsburgh.

The popularity of the Fox Kids' Goosebumps television series generated an interest among fans for a full-feature film based upon the show. In 1998, Tim Burton was attached to direct a Goosebumps film for 20th Century Fox. Chris Meledandri, the president of Fox Family Films at the time, said, "I think you'll see us tackling a scale of story that would be prohibitive to do on the small screen". However, the film did not materialize since they could not find a script they liked or determine which book to adapt into a film.

In 2008, Columbia Pictures acquired rights to create a Goosebumps film. Neal H. Moritz and Deborah Forte, the latter of whom had previously worked on the |Goosebumps television series, were chosen to produce the film. Screenwriting team Scott Alexander and Larry Karaszewski were hired as screenwriters, and wrote the original script for the film. The duo decided against adapting any one book in the series, feeling the individual books in the series were too short. Thinking of ways to create a universe where all the creatures in the books could live together, they elected to do a fake biographical film where Stine writes a book and the monsters within it become real. In 2010, Carl Ellsworth was chosen to write the screenplay. On January 14, 2012, it was reported that a new draft of the screenplay would be written by Darren Lemke. In November 2012, Stine expressed pessimism about the prospect of the film, noting the project's history of failing to come into fruition.

=== Casting ===
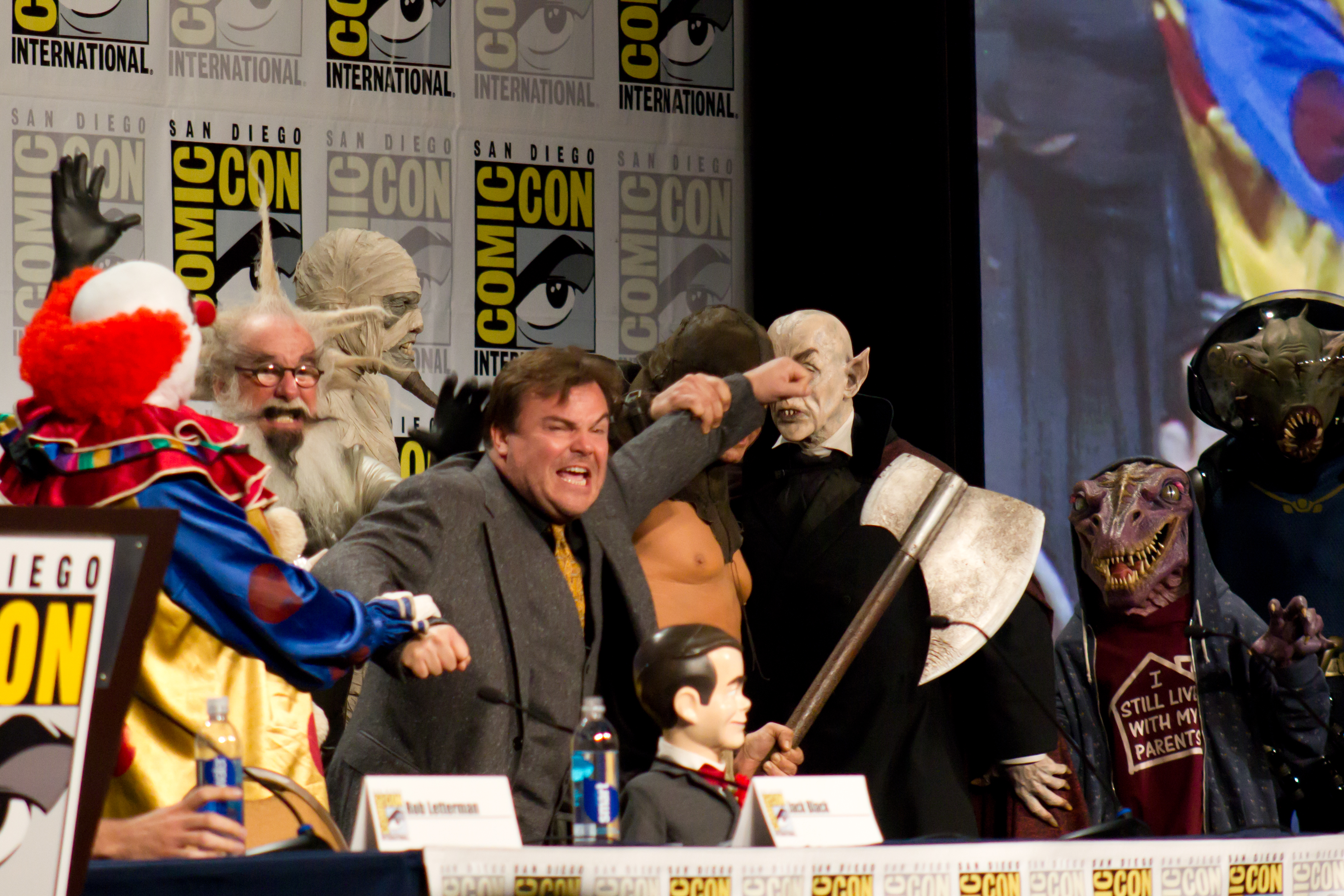
Jack Black "fighting" Slappy and his fellow monsters at the 2014 San Diego Comic-Con.

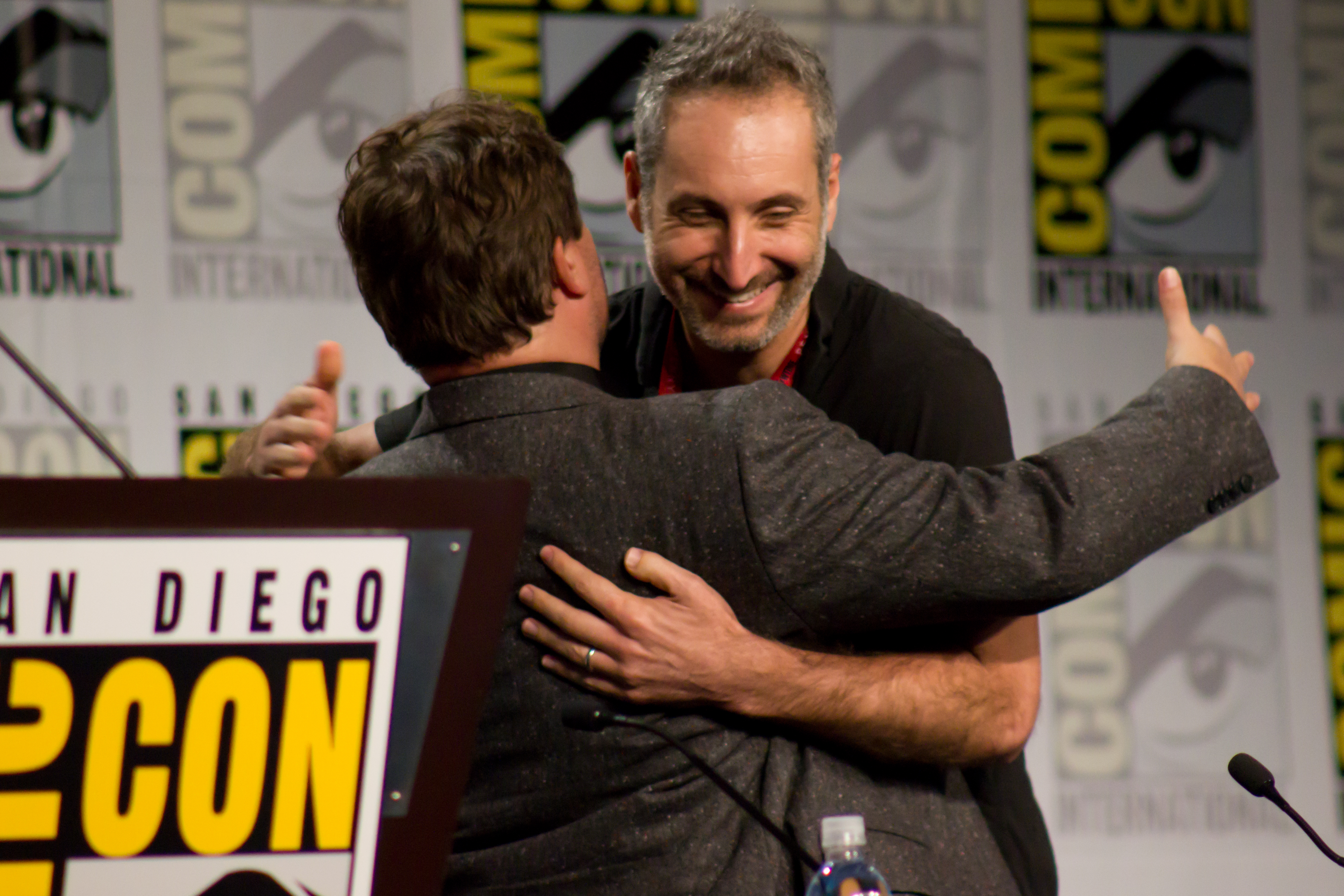
The film marks the third collaboration between Jack Black and director Rob Letterman, who previously worked together on Shark Tale and Gulliver's Travels

In September 2013, it was reported that Jack Black was in talks to "play a Stine-like author whose scary characters literally leap off the page, forcing him to hide from his own creepy creations". Black stated that he tried to make the character "more of a sort of curmudgeonly dark, brooding beast master". He also said that he attempted to approach this film the same way he does others, trying to "make it as funny as possible". Black met with Stine to get his consent for the film, but determined that his character could not be too similar to the real one; Black explained that he needed the character to be more sinister. Rob Letterman was chosen as the director, reuniting him with Black, after working together on Shark Tale and Gulliver's Travels.

It was announced in February 2014 that Dylan Minnette had been cast as Zach Cooper, and Odeya Rush as the Stine-like author's daughter, Hannah. On February 26, 2014, it was announced that the film would be released on March 23, 2016. On April 4, 2014, it was announced that Amy Ryan and Jillian Bell had joined the cast as Cooper's mother and aunt respectively. On April 10, 2014, Ken Marino joined the cast as Coach Carr. On April 28, 2014, Halston Sage joined the cast. On May 1, 2014, the film's release date was moved up to August 7, 2015. Stine stated on May 20, 2014, that he was going to make a cameo appearance in the film.

Some monsters due for an appearance in the film were cut for budgetary reasons, but Letterman stated that the crew tried to choose the monsters most appropriate to the story. Letterman also stated that he tried to combine both humor and horror in the film, commenting that "[t]he books themselves are legitimately scary, but they're legitimately funny, and we try to capture that". In November 2014, the release date was moved back to April 15, 2016. In January 2015, the release date was pushed forward to October 16, 2015.

=== Filming ===
In mid-April 2014, a crew of six spent three days gathering visual data for the film in downtown Madison, Georgia. The crew used a theodolite to collect points in three-dimensional space to complete a detailed survey of the city. The visual data was used to create a CGI background of the downtown. Neal Moritz and Rob Letterman stated that Madison was their first choice for the film after scouting the city. Principal photography on the film began on April 23, 2014, in Candler Park in Atlanta, notably at 345 (Zach's house) and 337 (R.L.Stine's house) Mell Avenue NE; they were also set to shoot the film in Conyers and Madison. On May 19, filming was taking place in the streets of Madison, with 480 Goosebumps crew members working in Madison and Morgan County. Principal photography ended on July 16, 2014. A stretch of Dawsonville Highway in Georgia was intermittently closed to film a car travelling up and down multiple bridges for the film.

== Music ==
The soundtrack for the film, featuring original music composed by Danny Elfman, was released on CD on October 23, 2015, by Sony Classical Records. The digital version was released by Madison Gate Records the week before.

== Release ==
=== Promotions ===
The film was promoted at the 2014 San Diego Comic-Con where Black and Letterman interacted with Slappy the Dummy. Slappy even brought some of his "friends" out consisting of the Bog Monster from How to Kill a Monster, two Graveyard Ghouls from Attack of the Graveyard Ghouls, Cronby the Troll and a Mulgani from Deep in the Jungle of Doom, the Lord High Executioner from A Night in Terror Tower, Murder the Clown from A Nightmare on Clown Street, the Mummy of Prince Khor-Ru from Return of the Mummy, Captain Long Ben One-Leg from Creep from the Deep, Professor Shock from The Creepy Creations of Professor Shock, Count Nightwing from Vampire Breath, a Creep from Calling All Creeps!, a Body Squeezer from Invasion of the Body Squeezers: Part 1 and Part 2, Carly Beth Caldwell's Haunted Mask form from The Haunted Mask, a Scarecrow from The Scarecrow Walks at Midnight, and a Pumpkin Head from Attack of the Jack-O'-Lanterns. When Jack Black tells Slappy that it is him that Slappy wants, Slappy instructs the Lord High Executioner, Murder the Clown, and Professor Shock to take Jack Black outside to his car. As the monsters leave, Slappy tells Rob some of his pitches causing Rob to leave as well.

Goosebumps was screened on June 24, 2015, at the CineEurope film distributors' trade fair in Barcelona, Spain, where the film was presented by Black on stage.

=== Home media ===
Goosebumps was released on Blu-ray (2D and 3D) and DVD on January 26, 2016, and includes deleted scenes, a blooper reel, interviews with the cast and crew, an alternate opening, an alternate ending, and a featurette about Slappy.

== Reception ==
=== Box office ===
Goosebumps grossed $80.1 million in North America and $70.1 million in other territories for a worldwide total of $150.2 million, against a budget of $58 million.

In the United States and Canada, pre-release trackings indicated the film would open to between $20–31 million at 3,501 theaters. However, Sony was more conservative, and projected the film to take between $12–15 million. The film opened on October 16, 2015, alongside Bridge of Spies, Crimson Peak, and Woodlawn, however box office pundits noted that it did not face serious competition except for The Martian, which was entering its third week. It made $600,000 from its early Thursday night screenings at 2,567 theaters, and $7.4 million on its opening day. In its opening weekend the film grossed $23.5 million, beating studio projections and finishing first at the box office. It marked the fourth Sony film to reign at the top of the box office during the fall. Previously the studio scored No. 1 spots over the last seven weeks with War Room, The Perfect Guy and Hotel Transylvania 2. Families represented the largest demographics with 60%, followed by under 25 with 59% and male/female ratio was split evenly at 50/50.

Outside North America, Goosebumps was released in a total of 66 countries. Mexico has so far represented its largest opening as well as the biggest market in terms of total earnings with $7.1 million followed by Australia ($6.3 million) and the United Kingdom and Ireland ($6 million). It opened at No. 1 in the United Kingdom and Ireland ($3.9 million). In the United Kingdom, preview takings helped Goosebumps top the box office ahead of the more heavily hyped Dad's Army. In Russia, it opened at No. 2 behind In the Heart of the Sea with $1.27 million. It opened in France with $1 million.

=== Critical reception ===
On Rotten Tomatoes the film has an approval rating of 78% based on 163 reviews, with an average rating of 6.4/10. The site's critical consensus reads, "Goosebumps boasts more than enough of its spooky source material's kid-friendly charm to make up for some slightly scattershot humor and a hurried pace." On Metacritic, the film has a score of 60 out of 100 based on 29 critics, indicating "mixed or average" reviews. Audiences polled by CinemaScore gave the film an average grade of "A" on an A+ to F scale.

Kevin P. Sullivan of Entertainment Weekly gave the film a B rating, citing at the end of his review: "Nothing about Goosebumps is revolutionary—at a certain point you may realize that it's as if Nickelodeon produced Cabin in the Woods—but it's a never-boring trip to a world, where stories and imagination are powerful tools, that just might inspire kids to do the scariest thing of all: pick up a book".

Geoff Berkshire of Variety wrote: "The ADD overload combined with an understandably kid-friendly approach to horror (no one’s ever in real danger, and the monsters are never too scary) results in a disposable product intended to appeal to everyone but likely to resonate with no one."

=== Accolades ===
Award	Category	Recipient	Result
Las Vegas Film Critics Society	Best Family Film		Nominated
Visual Effects Society	Outstanding Visual Effects in a Special Venue Project	Jason Schugardt, Mike Wigart, Alex Harding, Daniel Mars	Nominated
Saturn Awards	Best Fantasy Film		Nominated

== Sequel ==
Development of a sequel was reported in September 2015. Rob Letterman intended to return to direct, but dropped out due to scheduling conflicts, and Ari Sandel replaced him. Jack Black and Odeya Rush were set to reprise their roles as R. L. and Hannah Stine; Black's role was reduced to an uncredited cameo and Rush's role was ultimately cut. Goosebumps 2: Haunted Halloween was released in the United States on October 12, 2018.

== Television series ==
In April 2020, it was announced that a reboot live-action television series was in the works by Scholastic Entertainment, Sony Pictures Television Studios, and Neal H. Moritz's production company Original Film, who produced the 2015 film and its sequel. In March 2021, R.L. Stine stated that the series found a producer and director. In February 2022, it was announced that the series will be heading to Disney+.
