= Goosebumps SlappyWorld =

Book series R. L. Stine

Goosebumps SlappyWorld is a series of Goosebumps books by author R. L. Stine.

== Description ==
The series was launched for the 25th anniversary of the Goosebumps franchise and features Slappy the Dummy as the narrator and/or primary antagonist of each book.

R. L. Stine signed a new contract with Scholastic to write an additional six Goosebumps books in 2018.

== Books ==
| # | Title | Original published date | Pages | ISBN |
|---|---|---|---|---|
| 01 | Slappy Birthday To You | February 28, 2017 | 139 | 1-338-06828-8 |
When Ian Barker receives Slappy the Dummy for his birthday, mysterious things begin to happen around the house.
| 02 | Attack of the Jack | June 27, 2017 | 137 | 1-338-06836-9 |
When Violet and her brother Shawn visit their Uncle Jack for the summer, they open a mysterious chest with a living pirate puppet inside who takes them back in time in search of treasure.
| 03 | I am Slappy's Evil twin | September 26, 2017 | 129 | 1-338-06839-3 |
Luke's hotshot Hollywood producer father gets Slappy, but this time he comes with a twin named Snappy, and they cause twice the trouble.
| 04 | Please Do Not Feed the Weirdo | February 27, 2018 | 135 | 1-338-06847-4 |
Jordan and Karla find a hidden cage in a secret part of Carnival World that houses a little boy with shapeshifting powers that get triggered when someone feeds him food.
| 05 | Escape From Shudder Mansion | June 26, 2018 | 136 | 1-338-22299-6 |
Riley Shiner is obsessed with a video game based on a famous haunted house in his neighborhood. But soon, he discovers the dangers in the house are all too real.
| 06 | The Ghost of Slappy | August 28, 2018 | 133 | 1-338-22301-1 |
Shep Mooney has a ghost in his basement, and his troubles only increase when Slappy shows up at his house too.
| 07 | It's Alive! It's Alive! | February 26, 2019 | 134 | 1-338-22303-8 |
To win their school's robotics contest, Livvy and Gates create a robot named Francine whose reactions and malfunctions become increasingly human-like. And things get weirder when Livvy and Gates suspect that their parents may also be robots.
| 08 | The Dummy Meets the Mummy | July 9, 2019 | 142 | 1-338-22305-4 |
After Slappy is sent to a museum, he is forced to face-off against an ancient mummy.
| 09 | Revenge of the Invisible Boy | October 1, 2019 | 132 | 1-338-35571-6 |
Frankie Miller and his friends have a Magic Club, and a problem in the form of pesky Ari Goodwin. When their efforts to get revenge backfire, Frankie is turned invisible.
| 10 | Diary of a Dummy | March 3, 2020 | 130 | 1-338-35573-2 |
After accidentally bringing Slappy the Dummy home and managing to send him away again, Billy and Maggie discover that he left something behind in their house — his diary, and it might lead them to untold riches.
| 11 | They Call Me the Night Howler! | July 7, 2020 | 143 | 1-338-35575-9 |
While visiting a museum dedicated to comic book superheroes, comic book fan Mason Brady encounters a distraught man who gives him a superhero costume and announces that he's quitting crimefighting. Mason Brady recognizes it as the costume for The Night Howler and must suit up in order to stop supervillains from wrecking his town.
| 12 | My Friend Slappy | October 6, 2020 | 143 | 1-338-35577-5 |
Barton Suggs becomes friends with Slappy after he's brought to school for a class presentation and they team-up to take down the school.
| 13 | Monster Blood Is Back | March 2, 2021 | 135 | 1-338-35579-1 |
Sascha and Nicole buy a mysterious can called Monster Blood to get back at Ashli and Diggs who were the school cheaters in the competition. As the Monster Blood start growing and growing, things started to get out of control.
| 14 | Fifth Grade Zombies | July 6, 2021 | 134 | 1-338-35581-3 |
When city kid Todd Coates moves from Queens, New York, to live on a Wisconsin farm for a year, he's in for more than just hanging out with his cousins Mila and Skipper. Strange things begin to happen all around him. But Todd is the only one who sees them. Late at night. In the cornfields. Todd is convinced there is something of the undead variety out there. Will he be able to prove it to his classmates before school is dismissed… permanently?
| 15 | Judy and the Beast | September 7, 2021 | 130 | 1-338-75214-6 |
Judy Glassman lives with her brother Kenny and father Noah in a village at the foot of Evil Rock. Every winter, Kenny accompanies their dad up to the mansion at the top of the mountain to assist the rich, eccentric Grendel family with their house repairs. But this year, Judy convinces dad to let her come too. Judy has heard whispers about the Beast of Evil Rock -- a half-human creature who stalks the crags. And she's determined to find out for herself if it's true. Will Judy discover the secret of Evil Rock before the Beast finds her first?
| 16 | Slappy in Dreamland | March 1, 2022 | 121 | 1-338-75216-2 |
Richard Hsieh's life is about to become a total nightmare. His dad studies dreams and they hook his new Slappy doll up to the dream machine as a joke. All of a sudden, Richard's dreams are becoming scarier and scarier. Each time, seeing Slappy, his birthday present, come to life and wreak havoc. But they're only dreams, right? When his cousin Willow comes to spend a few days with him, she too begins to dream of Slappy. It's impossible! But when Slappy threatens to invade more kids' dreams, they'll have to figure out how to defeat him before he becomes a dream master.
| 17 | Haunting with the Stars | June 28, 2022 | 123 | 1-338-75218-9 |
Space-obsessed Murphy Shannon is pumped that his 6th grade class is visiting the Rayburne Observatory. Except, being a know-it-all means he's totally bored with the lectures he has to sit through. So when classmates Orly and Cleo say they should explore on their own, Murphy sneaks out with them. But when they come face-to-face with the strange Dr. Rayburne and his experiments, they realize they may be way in-over-their heads. A grand adventure in space may be in store for them, if they can survive...
| N–A | Slappy, Beware! | September 20, 2022 | 165 | 1-338-84707-4 |
The untold true story of Slappy in a terrifying new special edition! This is Slappy's world-- you only scream in it! But where did he come from? And can he ever be destroyed? Slappy the ventriloquist's dummy has only one mission in his tiny, deranged mind: do evil every day, all day. His creator, powerful sorcerer Darkwell the Magician, has warned him that should he fail to cause chaos before the sun sets each day, he will sleep FOREVER. Normally, this is a piece of poisonous cake for Slappy―but he may have met his match in the Carlton family. Each attempt at evil ends in disaster, and the dummy starts to panic. Will Slappy's scariest day yet bring an end to his reign of terror? This special edition features four full page pieces of original Slappy art!
| 18 | Night of the Squawker | April 4, 2023 | 119 | 1-338-75220-0 |
Beak-a-boo, it sees you! Cooper Klavan and his sister Anna are fishing with their parents at a woodland pond when they come across an injured bird. Anna, a huge animal lover, insists on taking it home to rehabilitate. But the bird really does not want to be rescued. It bites Anna, and scares Cooper. Soon, Anna is behaving very strangely. She's perching high up in trees, gathering sticks to hide in her room, and refusing to eat eggs-- once one of her favorite foods. Cooper doesn't want to jump to any conclusions, but his sister seems to be going to the birds... Note: This book was originally titled Feathers.
| 19 | Friiight Night | July 4, 2023 | 126 | 1-338-75220-0 |
Kelly Crosby is the new kid in school. So far, it's not going so well. He's already gotten lost, had trouble making friends, and annoyed the monster that lives in the school basement. That's right. This new school has a monster. All the area schools do. Every year, at a party called Friiight Night, one (un)lucky kid is chosen to be the monster's special guest of honor. Guess whose luck is about to run out? Note: This is the final book of the Goosebumps SlappyWorld series.
