= Ana Yi Puig =

American actress (born 1998)

- Puig in 2026
- Born: Ana Yi Puig Zhang; June 10, 1998 (age 28); Gainesville, Florida, U.S.
- Occupation: Actor
- Years active: 2019-present
- Notable work: Goosebumps

Ana Yi Puig is an American actress who is best known for playing Isabella Chen-Lopez in the Disney+/Hulu series Goosebumps (2023).

== Biography ==
Ana Yi Puig Zhang was born on June 10, 1998 in Gainesville, Florida. Her mother is from China and her father is from Puerto Rico. She attended Douglas Anderson School of the Arts, and graduated from Texas State University with a Bachelor of Fine Arts in Musical Theatre.

In 2019, she appeared in a 12-day run of the show Spring Awakening at Theatre Under the Stars. In September 2022, she was cast as Isabella in the show Goosebumps. In a 2022 talent showcase, ABC highlighted her as one of 16 emerging artists.

== Filmography ==
Year	Media	Role
2023	Goosebumps	Isabella
2022,2025	Jade Armor	Pearl
2022	Gossip Girl	Tiff Myers
2021	Senior Year	Young Tiffany Blanchette
2025	Swiped	Stephanie
2026	The Debut	Madeline
