= Slappy the Dummy =

Villain in the Goosebumps book series

- Goosebumps Series character
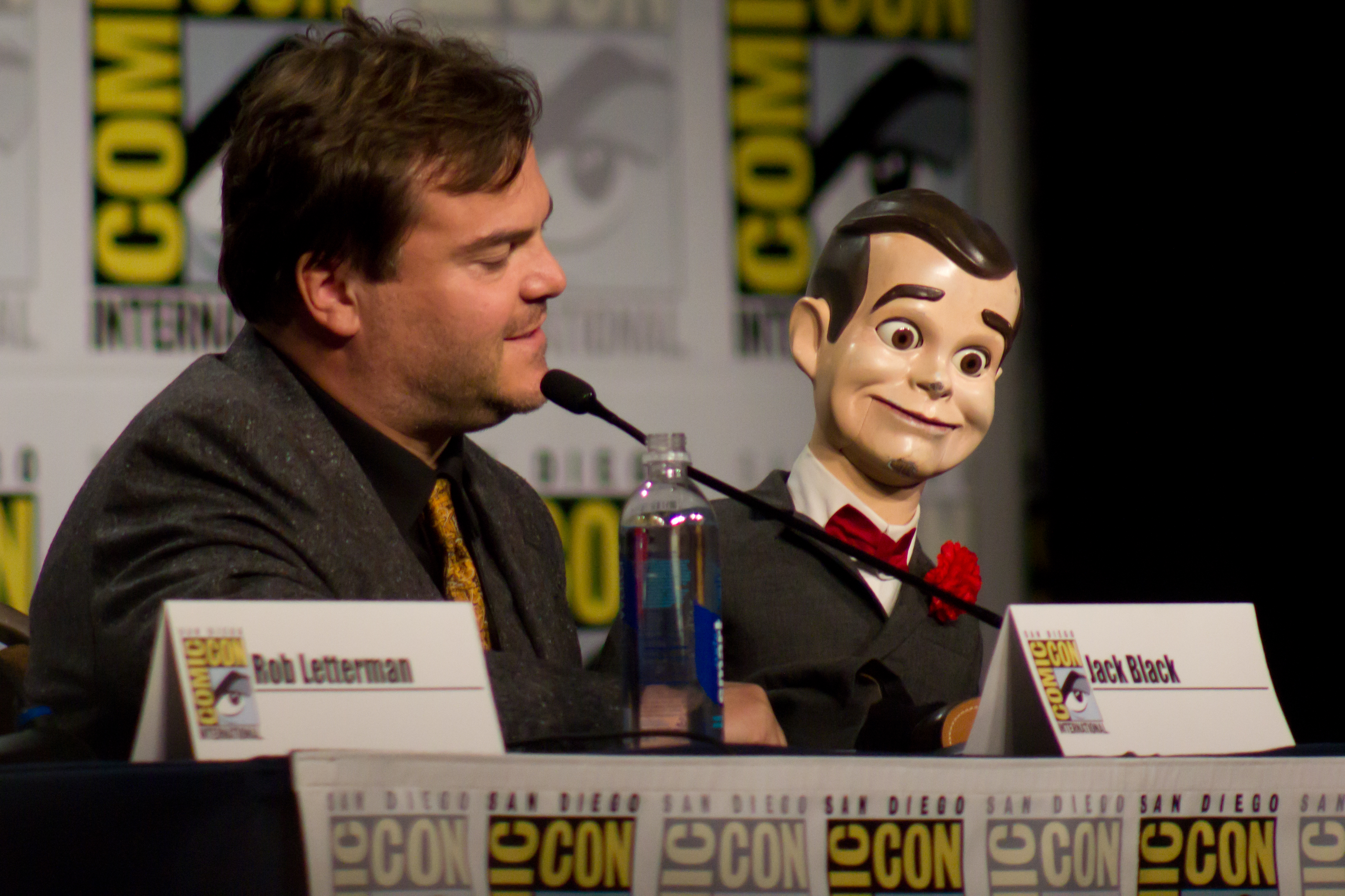
- Jack Black with Slappy the Dummy at the Goosebumps panel at San Diego Comic-Con in 2014
- First appearance: Night of the Living Dummy
- Last appearance: Goosebumps
- Created by: R. L. Stine

In-universe information
- Nicknames: The Dummy that is No Dummy, Mr. Bad Boy, Old Crazy Eyes, Smiley, Bobo
- Species: Possessed ventriloquist's dummy
- Gender: Male
- Family: Ephraim Darkwell (creator/father); Mr. Wood (brother); Wally (brother); Snappy (twin brother); Goldie (sister)
- Children: Jackson Stander; Rachel Stander

Slappy the Dummy is a fictional character in the Goosebumps children's horror novel series by R. L. Stine. He is the main antagonist of the Night of the Living Dummy series and one of the series' most popular villains, as well as its de facto mascot. He is additionally the main antagonist of the franchise's film adaptation and its sequel, described by their interpretation of Stine as having a "serious Napoleonic complex" in the former. He comes to life when the words, "Karru Marri Odonna Loma Molonu Karrano," which roughly translates to "You and I are one now" (meaning he and whoever brings him to life will become inseparable) and can be found on a sheet of paper in the coat pocket of Slappy's jacket, are read aloud. After being brought to life, Slappy will try to make the person who did so serve him as a slave, to the point of framing them for his misdeeds.

== Inspiration ==
According to R. L. Stine, Slappy took inspiration from Carlo Collodi's The Adventures of Pinocchio, as he liked the book's idea of a puppet coming to life.

Fats from William Goldman's Magic was another one of Stine's inspirations for Slappy. In the television adaptation of the books, Slappy has the same tone of voice as Fats' interpretation in the novel's film adaptation.

== Notable appearances in novels ==
Slappy the Dummy
Title	Year released	Information
Night of the Living Dummy	1993	In the first Night of the Living Dummy book, twin sisters Lindy and Kris Powell are taking a walk when they come across a dummy. Lindy names him Slappy, and decides to keep him even though Kris does not like him. Lindy becomes a good ventriloquist, and Kris gets jealous and gets her own dummy named Mr. Wood. After the acquisition of Mr. Wood, bad things start happening to and around the girls. Mr. Wood is defeated after getting crushed to death by a steamroller. However, Slappy comes to life and greets the girls when they arrive at their bedroom. Unlike other books, Slappy never causes any trouble despite being alive until the end.
Night of the Living Dummy II	1995	Slappy becomes the main antagonist in Night of the Living Dummy II. When Amy Kramer, the main character, wants a new ventriloquist's dummy for her family's weekly "talent show". Her dad finds Slappy at a local pawn shop and gives it to her as a gift. She finds a slip of paper with Slappy that has the magical words on it and reads it aloud, causing him to slowly come to life. He causes mischief and havoc for Amy and her family. Amy and her sister help kill Slappy. In the end, he is destroyed by Dennis, Amy's previous ventriloquist's dummy.
Night of the Living Dummy III	1996	Trina and Daniel O'Dell's dad came home one night with the broken Slappy, which he got for free from a man who he believes is Amy's father. Shortly after that day ends, Slappy magically repairs himself due to the fact that the family read aloud the words on the note he came with. The father renames him "Smiley," his new favorite member of his extensive collection of ventriloquist's dummies. After Trina and Daniel's cousin Zane decide to spend a few nights at their house, the other dummies begin causing problems and pranking the children. The main dummy is Rocky, who was first noticed by Zane in his bedroom. Trina and Daniel are always blamed for these events, which upsets them. It turns out that the real troublemaker is Slappy, with help from the other dummies who he brought to life. However, he is betrayed by them to protect the O'Dells. Despite seemingly being killed, Slappy is seen winking at Trina as Zane carries him to the car.
Bride of the Living Dummy	1998	A girl named Jillian takes her little sisters Katie and Amanda, accompanied by their doll Mary-Ellen, to a puppet show. It is being performed by teenager named Jimmy O'James, with Slappy the Dummy as his partner. At the show, Slappy spies the twins and Jillian with Mary-Ellen. Slappy then pulls the twins up on stage with Mary-Ellen and makes fun of them. The twins are hurt by his words and run off after the show concludes to tell him off, leaving Jillian to try to find them. While trying to find her twin sisters, Jillian finds Jimmy and Slappy's dressing room and walks in on Slappy punching Jimmy in the face. Jimmy tells her that he and Slappy are just working on a new act. She asks if they have seen her sisters. Jimmy responds with that he has not seen them since they were on stage. After she leaves, Jimmy puts Slappy to sleep and throws him out. Jillian's friend Harrison finds Slappy and brings him to Jillian's house, as he believes that Slappy is broken and wants Jillian's dad to fix him. After a series of troublesome events, Jillian and Harrison host a birthday party and try to put on a show, only to have it be revealed that Mary-Ellen is alive and that she revived Slappy so she could marry him. However, Slappy hates Mary-Ellen and truly wants to marry Jillian. Slappy and Mary-Ellen end up getting cut to pieces by a saw blade, but Slappy's spirit manages to possess Jillian.
Slappy's Nightmare	1999	Slappy starts out being the disobedient puppet of Jimmy O'James. Fed up with Slappy, Jimmy replaces Slappy with Wally. Wally tells Jimmy how to control Slappy's evil: cursing him to doing three good deeds in one week. Although it is revealed to be a nightmare of Slappy's, the book ends with his nightmare slowly coming true.
Revenge of the Living Dummy	2008	Britney Crosbey and her friend, Molly Molloy, have to put up with Britney's obnoxious cousin, Ethan, and his new friend Slappy, whom Ethan calls "Mr. Bad Boy". Slappy, seems to be the one causing the trouble this time, and Britney decides to put Slappy to sleep after she sees that she simply has to say the magic words again. But when she finds out that Slappy was reawakened by the magic words, he vows revenge and comes up with a plan to use a special 'Mind-Stealer' doll to make Britney into his own personal, perfect slave. At the end, Britney decides to use the 'Mind-Stealer' doll against Slappy, whose mind gets stolen at the end of the book. Slappy later makes two more appearances in Dr. Maniac vs. Robby Shwartz where he hunts down Britney and Molly and cruelly has them send Robby back to Horrorland's arcade. He also appears in Say Cheese and Die Screaming where, after taking a picture of Madam Doom's booth, Julie sees Slappy in the picture leaning against the booth.
The Streets of Panic Park	2009	Slappy appears in this book, and turns Britney into a dummy. However, he later teams up with Luke and Lizzy to escape The Menace in Horrorland and Panic Park to outsmart The Menace and escape from both parks. Slappy is eventually taken home by Lizzy.
Slappy New Year	2010	Ray Gordon brings an ordinary ventriloquist's dummy, Slappy, for his present and wants to scare his brother Brandon with it. Slappy New Year was a book in a planned-to-be-released series called Goosebumps Gold. The series was never released due to the expired contract that R. L. Stine had with Scholastic at the time. However, R. L. Stine did release the book, but changed the plotline. It was originally going to be the sequel to Slappy's Nightmare, but over the years since R. L. Stine changed the book's plot, he dropped the idea of it being a sequel. It was released on November 1, 2010.
Son of Slappy	2013	Jackson Stander is every parent's dream. He does not get into trouble, he always does his homework, and he never, ever lies. His teachers all trust him completely, and he even volunteers at the local Youth Center. But that was all before Jackson came across an evil ventriloquist's dummy. Now he must deal with Slappy and the son of Slappy as they wreak havoc on his family and friends. Jackson will soon see that two Slappys are not better than one!

He also appears in his own series Goosebumps SlappyWorld, where he serves as the narrator.

== Appearances beyond the books ==
Slappy has also been made into an actual ventriloquist doll available from major retailers. He was first manufactured by Goldberger Doll corporation after a nine-year-old boy from Long Island sent them a letter suggesting the idea in 1998. There is also a mask and a full costume available for sale. Night of the Living Dummy III and Bride of the Living Dummy have also been adapted for VHS and DVD; the second on DVD includes Bride of the Living Dummy.

Authors Douglas Preston and Lincoln Child posted an announcement via their Facebook status:

We have just written a short story with the amazing author, R. L. Stine. It will be published a year from now in a new, as yet unnamed, anthology. It features Pendergast and ... R.L. Stine's most terrifying creation, Slappy the ventriloquist's dummy. This is one strange, strange story ... The title is GASLIGHTED.

This was published on September 30, 2014, as Gaslighted: Slappy the Ventriloquist Dummy vs. Aloysius Pendergast in the anthology Face Off edited by David Baldacci.

== In other media ==
=== Television ===
- Cal Dodd (Cathal J. Dodd) was the voice of Slappy in the original television series. Cal voiced the theme song for the series as well as on several DVDs. Slappy was performed on set and voiced by puppeteer Ron Stefaniuk, who appeared in four episodes ("Night of the Living Dummy II", "Night of the Living Dummy III Part I", "Night of the Living Dummy III Part II", and "Bride of the Living Dummy"). The original Night of the Living Dummy story was never adapted to television, nor were the six post-Bride stories.
- Kanduu, better known as Slappy, appears as the main antagonist in the 2023 Goosebumps series on Disney+, voiced by Chris Geere. In "Night of the Living Dummy", Slappy was bought in a magic shop by Ephraim, in an effort to revitalize his failed career as a magician. Ephraim found a spell in Slappy's pocket that gave him life, and with its help, he became a successful ventriloquist, but at the cost being left by his family for only focusing on the puppet. Eventually, Slappy had Ephraim retrieve the coffin of someone named Kanduu and urged him to read the spell hidden inside. However Ephraim had a vision of people dying in a large burning tower and rejected the doll's influence and locked him in a briefcase, Ephraim buys a house in Port Lawrence and hid Slappy behind a wall in the basement. In 1993, ten years after Ephraim's death, his estranged descendants, the Biddles, inherited the house. Slappy was found by Ephraim's great-grandson Harold, who was bullied at his previous school, having a hard time adjusting to the new town. He had complete influence over Harold, further isolating him and causing him to get rid of his parents by turning them into wooden puppets. After Slappy and Harold humiliate Sarah and her friends Ben, Victoria, Eliza and Nora, at a school show, Nora finds out about Slappy acting alone, and she convinced the others to take him away from Harold, in going to his house that night and stole Slappy. After Harold's death in his basement fire, Slappy is broken into pieces by Ben, who along with his friends hide his remains and keep the events of that night a secret. In present day, Harold Biddle returns from the afterlife and possessed the school teacher Nathan Bratt in order to search for Slappy and get revenge on his supposed murderers' children through the use of his personal possessions. In "You Can't Scare Me", Slappy's remains are taken by Nora to a snowy mountain until recovered by Bratt/Biddle. Slappy and Harold trying to get rid of Isaiah, the friends and parents tell Harold the whole truth, he saves Isaiah and throws Slappy off the cliff, and by forgiving them, he reunites with his parents in the afterlife. Down the cliff, Slappy, though broken again, opens his eyes. In "Night of the Living Dummy Part 2", Slappy is found again now by Mr. Bratt, who has writer's block and under pressure from his financial problems, he is resurrected, as is Bratt's deceased pet, Fifi, now as a vampire poodle. After Bratt finds Kanduu's coffin and reads the spell hidden inside, Slappy's spirit is released and restores his human body, and turns Ben into a puppet. In "Welcome to Horrorland", Kanduu's story sees how his soul was transferred to the Slappy doll by Mahar, a puppet maker. He was a soldier who was wounded while fighting in trenches during an unknown war. Under the trenches he found a hidden temple filled with magic spells, which he used to heal himself. He eventually became a famous magician using the spells he learned. Mahar, the owner of the circus he worked for learned he intended to sacrifice a thousand people to unleash hordes of monsters on humanity, so they would stop fighting petty wars and unite against a common enemy. His plan failed as Mahar trapped his soul in the Slappy dummy.

=== Film ===
- Slappy is the main antagonist of the franchise's film adaptation, in which he is voiced by Jack Black, who additionally portrayed R. L. Stine and provided the voice of Brent Green from My Best Friend Is Invisible, with Avery Lee Jones providing the character's puppeteer work (Jones additionally did the voice of Slappy for promotional material for the film), assisted by Ironhead Studio's Jake McKinnon.
- Slappy returns as the main antagonist of the film's sequel, Goosebumps 2: Haunted Halloween, this time voiced by actor Mick Wingert with Jones re-providing his puppeteer work (this time assisted by technicians from Legacy Effects) and voicing him for promotional material, as well as for a few lines of dialogue and all of his laughs in the final film.

=== Video games ===
- Slappy appears in the Goosebumps: Horror Town video game.

=== Print media ===
- Slappy appears in the comic book series made by IDW and the Goosebumps graphix.
- The Bensons, a group of nonverbal ventriloquist's dummies who serve as the henchmen of Gabby Gabby in Toy Story 4, were inspired by Slappy.

== See also ==
- "The Rival Dummy", a 1928 short story by Ben Hecht
- The Great Gabbo, a 1929 film inspired by "The Rival Dummy"
- Dead of Night, a 1948 horror film with a ventriloquist's dummy sequence
- Studio One episode 22 (season 2 episode 2) adapted "The Rival Dummy" on 19 September 1949
- "The Dummy", a 1962 episode of The Twilight Zone
- "Caesar and Me", a 1963 episode of The Twilight Zone about an evil ventriloquist dummy who can speak and walk on his own
- Arnold Wesker a.k.a. the Ventriloquist, a comic book supervillain who unconsciously expresses aggression through his ventriloquist's dummy, Scarface
- Magic, a 1978 psychological horror movie starring Anthony Hopkins as a ventriloquist.
- Toy Story 4, a 2019 American animated comedy-drama film, in which a group of ventriloquist dummies appear as supporting antagonists.
