= Goosebumps 2: Haunted Halloween =

2018 film by Ari Sandel

- Theatrical release poster
- Directed by: Ari Sandel
- Screenplay by: Rob Lieber
- Story by: Rob Lieber; Darren Lemke
- Based on: Goosebumps by R. L. Stine
- Produced by: Deborah Forte; Neal H. Moritz
- Starring: Wendi McLendon-Covey; Madison Iseman; Jeremy Ray Taylor; Caleel Harris; Chris Parnell; Ken Jeong
- Cinematography: Barry Peterson
- Edited by: David Rennie; Keith Brachmann
- Music by: Dominic Lewis
- Production companies: Columbia Pictures; Sony Pictures Animation; Original Film; Scholastic Entertainment; Silvertongue Films
- Distributed by: Sony Pictures Releasing
- Release dates: October 8, 2018 (Culver City); October 12, 2018 (United States)
- Running time: 89 minutes
- Country: United States
- Language: English
- Budget: $35 million
- Box office: $93.3 million

Goosebumps 2: Haunted Halloween (or simply Goosebumps 2 as marketed on home release) is a 2018 American comedy horror film directed by Ari Sandel and written by Rob Lieber from a story by Lieber and Darren Lemke. A stand-alone sequel to 2015's Goosebumps, it is based on the children's horror book series of the same name by R. L. Stine. The new cast consists of Wendi McLendon-Covey, Madison Iseman, Jeremy Ray Taylor, Caleel Harris, Chris Parnell and Ken Jeong.

The plot follows a pair of young boys who inadvertently unleash the monsters of the Goosebumps franchise upon their hometown after discovering an unpublished Goosebumps story, inciting a wave of destruction on Halloween night.

Development of the film began in September 2015. Rob Letterman intended to return to direct, but dropped out due to scheduling conflicts with Detective Pikachu, so Ari Sandel replaced him as director. Jack Black and Odeya Rush were set to reprise their roles as R. L. Stine and Hannah Fairchild, respectively; Black's role was uncredited and Rush's role was ultimately not included in the final script.

Goosebumps 2 was released in the United States on October 12, 2018, by Sony Pictures Releasing through its Columbia Pictures label. The film received mixed reviews from critics and grossed $93 million worldwide.

== Plot ==
Teenager Sarah Quinn lives with her mother, Kathy, and her younger brother, Sonny, in the town of Wardenclyffe, New York and is writing an essay for her college application while Halloween is just around the corner. Sonny's friend, Sam Carter, is dropped off at their house to be looked after while his parents are away for the next three days.

Scavenging for items in an abandoned house formerly owned by R. L. Stine after school, they find an unpublished Goosebumps manuscript and unlock it, resulting in Slappy the Dummy appearing, who is currently inanimate. Leaving the house after obliviously reading the incantation that brings Slappy to life, they are intercepted by bully Tommy Madigan, who steals the manuscript from them. He and his friends attempt to chase the duo home, but are secretly stopped by the now-brought-to-life Slappy.

Back home, Slappy reveals his sentience to the duo, but requests that they keep him a secret from the other Quinns. The next day, Slappy tries to assert himself as a member of the family – first by assaulting Sarah's boyfriend, Tyler Mitchell, for recently cheating on her, then causing damaging to one of the classrooms of Sonny's school after sabotaging his science project, a working model of the abandoned Wardenclyffe Tower created by Nikola Tesla. Now aware of Slappy's true nature, the duo and Sarah settle on getting rid of him, only for him to escape when they attempt to do so.

As Halloween night arrives, the trio find an article online regarding events that occurred in the town of Madison, Delaware. (Note: As depicted in Goosebumps (2015)) Through further research, they discover that the unpublished manuscript is required to stop Slappy and attempt to contact his creator, R. L. Stine, for assistance, but leave a voicemail when he is unavailable. Meanwhile, Slappy visits a local Fred's and uses his powers to bring various Halloween costumes and decorations to life, some of which are Goosebumps themed; he additionally brainwashes the store manager, Walter, to his cause using a mask. Slappy soon reactivates the Wardenclyffe Tower and uses it to bring the town's Halloween decor to life.

As Sonny and Sam retrieve the manuscript at Tommy's house, during which they discover it can imprison anything Slappy had brought to life, it is unfortunately stolen by his forces, which then abduct Kathy. Mr. Chu, the Quinns' neighbor and an avid Goosebumps fan, assists the trio in disguising themselves to safely navigate the town. They infiltrate the Wardenclyffe Tower and confront Slappy, who has now made Kathy like him. After some conflict, the trio defeat him as Sarah combines the recovered manuscript's power with the energy of the tower's reactor to save the town, with Kathy and Walter additionally being returned to normal. In the aftermath, Stine arrives, having received the trio's voicemail but only to learn that the threat has been neutralized and congratulates them for their heroism, as well as giving Sarah advice on writing her essay.

Afterwards, Kathy and Walter start a relationship as Sarah completes her college application and is accepted. Elsewhere, Stine is confronted by a surviving Slappy, who entraps his creator in a new Goosebumps story he himself conceived.

== Cast ==
- Mick Wingert as the voice of Slappy the Dummy
  - Avery Lee Jones returned to provide the character's puppeteer work.
- Madison Iseman as Sarah Quinn, a teenager living in Wardenclyffe, New York
- Jeremy Ray Taylor as Sonny Quinn, Sarah's younger brother
- Caleel Harris as Sam Carter, Sonny's best friend from school
- Wendi McLendon-Covey as Kathy Quinn, Sonny and Sarah's single mother who works at Wardenclyffe's local nursing home
- Chris Parnell as Walter, the manager of Wardenclyffe's local Fred's who has a crush on Kathy and is later brainwashed by Slappy via a rubber mask he enchants
- Ken Jeong as Mr. Chu, the Quinns' next-door neighbor who is an avid fan of the Goosebumps franchise
- Kendrick Cross as Sam's unnamed father
- Shari Headley as Sam's unnamed mother
- Bryce Cass as Tyler Mitchell, Sarah's boyfriend who is later revealed to be cheating on her
- Peyton Wich as Tommy Madigan, a bully who frequently accosts Sonny and Sam
- Déja Dee as Mrs. Hoover, a teacher at Sonny and Sam's school
- Jack Black (uncredited) as R. L. Stine, the disturbed genius behind the Goosebumps franchise
  - The real R. L. Stine cameoed as Principal Harrison, the principal of Sonny and Sam's school

A scene features a pair of action figures modeled after Ryu and Ken Masters from Capcom's Street Fighter series. When Slappy brings them to life, they play pre-existing voice clips from the source material.

== Production ==
On September 2, 2015, it was reported that a sequel to the film Goosebumps was already in the planning stages, with Sony looking for a screenwriter. On January 17, 2017, a January 26, 2018 release date was set, and Rob Letterman confirmed that he was to return as director for the sequel. On February 6, 2017, it was announced that the film's release date had been delayed to September 21, 2018, taking the date previously held by Hotel Transylvania 3: Summer Vacation.

In May 2017, the title was said to be Goosebumps: HorrorLand. At the time, it was also reported that Jack Black would reprise his role as R. L. Stine.

In November 2017, Rob Lieber was tapped to pen the script. In December 2017, Ari Sandel was announced as the director instead of Letterman, due to Letterman being busy directing Detective Pikachu for Legendary Entertainment. Variety reported that two scripts had been written: one script in which Black would reprise his role, while the other had Black cut out entirely. In December 2017, the sequel's release date was pushed to October 12, 2018.

The film was later renamed Goosebumps: Slappy's Revenge, and its new leading cast members were set as Madison Iseman, Ben O'Brien, Caleel Harris and Jeremy Ray Taylor (O'Brien did not appear in the finished film). Ken Jeong, Chris Parnell and Wendi McLendon-Covey joined the following month. Filming began on March 7, and in April 2018 the title was renamed again, to Haunted Halloween.

It was initially stated by Sony representatives that Avery Lee Jones, who puppeteered Slappy in the film, would also voice the character. Jack Black returned for the film as Stine, and it was later reported that Mick Wingert would actually voice Slappy.

== Release ==
Goosebumps 2: Haunted Halloween was released on October 12, 2018. The film's first trailer premiered on July 11, 2018, the international trailer on August 16, 2018, and a third trailer on September 20, 2018. A television spot was released on September 24, 2018, which also confirmed that Jack Black would return for the film. Unlike the first film where it was given RealD 3D screenings, the sequel was not in the format.

Goosebumps 2: Haunted Halloween was released on Digital on December 25, 2018, and DVD and Blu-ray on January 15, 2019.

== Reception ==
=== Box office ===
Goosebumps 2: Haunted Halloween grossed $46.7 million in the United States and Canada, and $46.6 million in other territories, for a total worldwide gross of $93.3 million, against a production budget of $35 million. In the United States and Canada, Goosebumps 2: Haunted Halloween was released alongside First Man and Bad Times at the El Royale, and was projected to gross $15–21 million from 3,521 theaters in its opening weekend.

The film made $4.9 million on its first day, including $750,000 from Thursday night previews, up from $600,000 by the first film. It went on to debut to $15.8 million (down 33% from the first film's opening of $23.6 million), finishing fourth at the box office, behind Venom, A Star Is Born and First Man. The film dropped 38% in its second weekend, to $9.7 million, remaining in fourth.

The film was released in the United Kingdom on October 19, 2018, and opened in third, behind A Star Is Born and Halloween.

=== Critical response ===
On Rotten Tomatoes, the film has an approval rating of 48% based on 93 reviews, with an average rating of 5.4/10. The website's critical consensus reads, "Goosebumps 2: Haunted Halloween offers a handful of treats for very young viewers, but compared to the entertaining original, this sequel is a ding dong to ditch." On Metacritic, the film has a weighted average score of 53 out of 100, based on 20 critics, indicating "mixed or average" reviews. Audiences polled by CinemaScore gave the film an average grade of "B" on an A+ to F scale, down from the "A" earned by the first film.

Bilge Ebiri, writing for Vulture, said: "The first Goosebumps movie ... had wit, speed, and an imaginative spirit, throwing all sorts of rampaging, creatively designed ghouls at us. Goosebumps 2: Haunted Halloween can't quite make the same claim. It replicates the template and the atmosphere of the original, but it lacks invention and emotional investment", and added: "The movie feels undercooked on every level. True, it's all meant to be slight and charming and inoffensive — but there's a way to make this sort of thing work, and Goosebumps 2 doesn't seem particularly interested in trying to find it."

Ignatiy Vishnevetsky of The A.V. Club gave the film a grade of C, writing: "Though the new Goosebumps 2: Haunted Halloween gets closer to the spirit of Stine's bestselling books, it also shares their reliance on formula, recreating the first movie's monster mash with fewer self-referential gags." He concluded: "though Sandel relies less on exasperating, rubbery digital effects than Rob Letterman, the DreamWorks Animation vet who helmed the original, his direction of the monsters and mayhem is never more than workmanlike, racing joylessly through a shaky plot that barely holds attention."

Writing for The Globe and Mail, Kate Taylor was more positive in her review of the film, giving it a score of 3 stars out of 4 and writing: "With a mere cameo from Jack Black as the reclusive Stine and fewer clever twists in the plot, Goosebumps 2 risks the diminishing-returns scenario that plagues most sequels; what saves it is a climax that is fresh rather than frantic." She concluded: "the safely scary and often amusing formula holds. Meanwhile, the movie's conclusion includes enough plot about Stine's fate to suggest Goosebumps 3 will feature more of the elusive Black and that can only be a good thing."

== See also ==
- List of films set around Halloween
