= Subliterature =

Subliterature or trivialliteratur is popular writing and texts that are sometimes called literature but not so classified by literary critics. Subliterature is intrinsically considered inferior to literature in terms of writing skill, depth and legacy. Subliterature is considered to have little influence on future literature despite any popular or commercial success. Characteristics of subliterature share some aspects of pop music:

- Appeal to a general audience
- Tendency to reflect existing trends rather than progressive developments.

== Examples of books considered subliterature ==
- The Da Vinci Code
- Twilight
- Hush, Hush
- Fifty Shades of Grey

== Sources ==
- Aguilar Serrano, Pedro (2014). "La poesía kitsch como instrumento del poder en el siglo XVII". Historia y Comunicación Social (in Spanish). 19: 689–701.
