= Ari Sandel =

American filmmaker

- Born: Ari Devon Sandel; September 5, 1974 (age 52); Calabasas, California, U.S.
- Education: MFA USC School of Cinematic Arts
- Occupations: Film director; screenwriter
- Years active: 2005–present

Ari Devon Sandel (born September 5, 1974) is an American filmmaker. He is known for directing the short film West Bank Story (2005), which won the 2006 Academy Award in the category Best Live Action Short Film.

== Life and career ==
Sandel was born and raised in Calabasas, California, the son of Kathy (Hale) and Dan Sandel. His father is Israeli and his mother is American. He is Jewish. He studied Media Arts at the University of Arizona in Tucson where he also received a special certificate in Middle Eastern Studies. He went on to earn his Directing MFA from the University of Southern California's School of Cinema–Television. West Bank Story premiered at the Sundance Film Festival and has screened at over one hundred fifty film festivals worldwide, winning prizes from 30.

Sandel also directed a 2006 documentary, Wild West Comedy Show: 30 Days & 30 Nights - Hollywood to the Heartland, which premiered at the Toronto International Film Festival.

In 2015, Sandel's feature film directorial debut, teen comedy The DUFF, was released in theaters.

Sandel directed the horror comedy sequel Goosebumps 2: Haunted Halloween, which began filming in February 2018, and which was released in October of that year.

In 2024, Sandel and fiancée Sabine Moestrup welcomed a baby girl together.

== Filmography ==
Short films

- West Bank Story (2005)

Documentary

- Wild West Comedy Show: 30 Days & 30 Nights – Hollywood to the Heartland (2006)

Television

- Aim High (2013)
- Shadowhunters (2018)

Feature films

- The DUFF (2015)
- When We First Met (2018)
- Goosebumps 2: Haunted Halloween (2018)
