= List of Goosebumps audiobooks =

The following is a list of audiobooks from the Goosebumps book series.

== Original series audio cassettes (1996–1997) ==
The first seven audiobooks were adapted from the original Goosebumps series and released on abridged audio cassette through Walt Disney Records from 1996 to 1997. They featured a full voice-cast.

#	Title	Original published date	Narrator	Length	ISBN
01	Attack of the Mutant	November 1996	Richard Steven Horvitz	60 minutes	0-763-40087-4
The Masked Mutant can change his molecules and turn himself into just about anything. Anything evil, that is. No wonder he's Skipper Matthew's favorite supervillain. Reading about him in comics is exciting but meeting him in person is a whole other story.
02	Deep Trouble	November 1996	Wendy Vinitsky	60 minutes	0-763-40088-2
There's something lurking down deep at the bottom of the ocean that even the sharks are afraid of. When Billy Deep and his sister Sheena picked this place for their snorkeling adventure, they had no idea what kind of adventure they were in for.
03	The Haunted Mask II	November 1996	Ted Kryczko	60 minutes	0-763-40083-1
The coolest Halloween mask Steve Boswell has ever seen has green gobs of goo, wrinkled skin and spider infested ears. But why is Steve feeling so strange? Does he have the scariest mask ever or does the scary mask have him?
04	A Night in Terror Tower	November 1996	Ted Kryczko	60 minutes	0-763-40086-6
People have been visiting London's Terror Tower for more than a thousand years, but not all of them were tourists and not all of them made it out alive. Now Sue and her brother Eddie have lost their group and they're in the gloomy old prison tower alone. Or are they? ...
05	Revenge of the Lawn Gnomes	November 1996	Justin Shenkarow	60 minutes	0-763-40085-8
Having a father who collects lawn ornaments is scary enough without having them come to life and cause trouble all over the neighborhood. Now Joe Burton and Moose McCall have to catch two nasty gnomes in the act or else all the mischief in the town will be blamed on them.
06	A Shocker on Shock Street	November 1996	Carolyn Lawrence	60 minutes	0-763-40084-X
Erin Wright and her friend Marty get to test the rides in a new theme park. Unfortunately the new rides still have a few bugs in them including humungous praying mantises.
07	Welcome to Dead House	May 1997	Ted Kryczko	60 minutes	0-763-40316-4
Amanda and Josh move with their parents into an old haunted house located in the strange town of Dark Falls where people are unlike any they have known before.

== UK audio cassettes (1997) ==
The next four audiobooks were also adapted from the original Goosebumps series and released on abridged audio cassette in the UK through Tempo Records in 1997. They also featured a full voice-cast.

#	Title	Original published date	Narrator	Length	ISBN
01	Welcome to Dead House	1997	--	60 minutes	1-860-22155-6
Amanda and Josh move with their parents into an old haunted house located in the strange town of Dark Falls where people are unlike any they have known before.
02	Stay Out of the Basement	1997	--	60 minutes	1-860-22154-8
Dr. Brewer is doing a little plant testing in his basement. Nothing to worry about. Harmless, really. But Margaret and Casey Brewer are worried about their father. Especially when they...meet...some of the plants he is growing down there. Then they notice that their father is developing plantlike tendencies. In fact he is becoming distinctly weedy - and seedy. Is it just part of their father's "harmless" experiment? Or has the basement turned into another little shop of horrors?
03	Welcome to Camp Nightmare	1997	--	60 minutes	1-860-22157-2
Billy Harlan's stay at Camp Nightmoon turns to horror when word of a monster lurking in the woods crops up, followed by a series of events leaving campers injured and missing.
04	A Night in Terror Tower	1997	Teresa Gallagher	60 minutes	0-793-94463-5
People have been visiting London's Terror Tower for more than a thousand years, but not all of them were tourists and not all of them made it out alive. Now Sue and her brother Eddie have lost their group and they're in the gloomy old prison tower alone. Or are they? ...

== Goosebumps HorrorLand (2008–2009) ==
The next twelve audiobooks were adapted from the Goosebumps HorrorLand series and released in unabridged 2-disc audio sets through Scholastic Audiobooks from 2008 to 2009.

#	Title	Original published date	Narrator	Length	ISBN
01	Revenge of the Living Dummy	August 1, 2008	Alissa Hunnicutt	2 hours and 34 minutes	0-545-08496-2
The thrill ride begins when 12-year-old Britney Crosby encounters an old ventriloquist's dummy with a lively secret--and a wicked plan. Just when she thinks the nightmare is over, Britney receives an invitation to an amusement park where everything is not as it seems. Who--or what--is summoning ordinary kids to HorrorLand? Britney and her friends must find out fast--or remain trapped forever in the scariest place on Earth.
02	Creep From the Deep	September 1, 2008	Jeff Woodman	2 hours and 27 minutes	0-545-08848-8
Billy and his sister, Sheena, unwittingly dive into a terrifying mystery when they accept a surprise invitation to HorrorLand--the amusement park that always lives up to its name. But first Billy and Sheena must sink or swim aboard a doomed ship that happens to be underwater--with a captain who happens to be dead. At least, he used to be!
03	Monster Blood for Breakfast	November 1, 2008	Charlie McWade	2 hours and 29 minutes	0-545-11152-8
For an athlete like Matt Daniels, breakfast is the most important meal of the day. It's also the most dangerous. That's because somebody is about to pull a mean prank. The recipe is simple: Just add gooey, green Monster Blood. As if Matt's problems weren't big and slimy enough, an invitation to HorrorLand is also on its way. Can Matt survive inside a terrifying scream park where trouble lurks behind every turnstile? Can YOU?
04	The Scream of the Haunted Mask	November 1, 2008	Kate Simses	2 hours and 37 minutes	0-545-11153-6
After the worst Halloween ever, Carly Beth assumed that nothing could be scarier than a drooling rubber mask with a mind of its own. The Haunted Mask is its name. Don't wear it out. One year later, the ugly, green mask mysteriously calls out to her again, and ugly, green masks don't like to be ignored. If Carly Beth can survive the night, even a terrifying amusement park like HorrorLand might seem like a vacation. Then again, maybe not ...
05	Dr. Maniac vs. Robby Schwartz	December 1, 2008	Marc Thompson	2 hours and 33 minutes	0-545-11154-4
Robby creates his own comic strips so he can freak out his friends and family. His favorite character is Dr. Maniac, a villain with a wicked grin and even wickeder superpowers. And now Dr. Maniac is on the loose . . . in the real world! Will Robby survive his encounter with Dr. Maniac and join the other kids who have been summoned to HorrorLand? Either way, danger DRAWS closer and closer. . .
06	Who's Your Mummy?	January 21, 2009	Ashley Albert	2 hours and 31 minutes	1-607-75487-8
Abby and Peter are staying with Uncle Jonathan in an eerie old village. Their uncle knows a lot about Egyptian pyramids, and his living room even looks like an ancient tomb. Do other secrets lurk inside Uncle Jonathan's house? MUM's the word! Next, Abby and Peter will get all WRAPPED up in a terrifying mystery. Slappy the Dummy and other villains have been sighted in HorrorLand theme park. A monster named Byron might offer help... if they can find him.
07	My Friends Call Me Monster	January 1, 2009	Vinnie Penna	2 hours and 22 minutes	0-545-11160-9
Before joining the other kids trapped in HorrorLand, Michael Munroe will learn a few new lessons in FEAR: Never trust a teacher who calls everybody "Little Monsters." Be careful if that teacher invites you to lunch at her house. And never EVER trust a teacher with a giant monster egg in her own attic--especially if it's about to hatch!
08	Say Cheese - and Die Screaming!	April 1, 2009	Meredith Zeitlan	2 hours and 26 minutes	0-545-11258-3
Someone--or something--is inviting ordinary kids to HorrorLand and trapping them there. But they're not the only guests of the terrifying theme park where nightmares come to life. Slappy the Dummy, Monster Blood, and other vile villains have joined the terror trip, too. And now an eerie camera is predicting trouble: Somebody might be gone in a FLASH!.
09	Welcome to Camp Slither	May 1, 2009	Andrew Rannells	2 hours and 10 minutes	0-545-13852-3
Twelve-year-old Boone and his sister Heather love animals of every kind. That's why they wanted to come to Camp Hither. The wild legends of man-eating snakes and disappearing campers are hisss-terical! But Camp Hither has a cold-blooded secret: Somebody has unleashed a hungry horde of slithery snakes! Can these two survive long enough to accept their invitation to HorrorLand? Yesssssss! But only if they figure out why Camp Hither is crawling with trouble.
10	Help! We Have Strange Powers!	May 1, 2009	Cassandra Morris	2 hours and 33 minutes	0-545-13853-1
Jilly and her twin brother, Jackson, are startled when they suddenly discover they can read each other's thoughts. But that's not all. They can read other people's thoughts, too! The strange new powers are exciting...at first. But soon they discover that somebody else knows their secret. Somebody who will stop at nothing to control their powers...
11	Escape from HorrorLand	June 1, 2009	Suzy Jackson	2 hours and 35 minutes	0-545-13854-X
Not long ago, Luke and Lizzy Morris dared to spend one day at HorrorLand, the terrifying theme park where nightmares come to life. They thought that NOTHING could lure them back, but their travel plans are about to change.... Who--or WHAT--is summoning ordinary kids to HorrorLand and trapping them there? Luke and Lizzy are determined to find out. They've gathered every clue, and they even launched their own secret website at EscapeHorrorLand.com. This time, Luke and Lizzy are prepared to face any danger--and any villain. Or so they thought...
12	The Streets of Panic Park	July 1, 2009	Suzy Jackson & Marc Thompson	2 hours and 37 minutes	0-545-13855-8
The kids who are trapped in HorrorLand thought they had reason enough to panic. That was before they reached Panic Park. It seemed like the only way to escape the mysterious villain who's playing puppet-master with their lives. But Panic Park is a perilous place, and it makes HorrorLand seem like HappyLand! Now they must face their greatest fears--and team up with the unlikeliest allies--in this shocking conclusion to the ride of a lifetime.

== Classic Goosebumps (2015) ==
The next fifteen audiobooks were adapted from the original Goosebumps series and released in unabridged 2-disc audio sets through Scholastic Audiobooks to help promote the 2015 Goosebumps film.

#	Title	Original published date	Narrator	Length	ISBN
01	The Curse of the Mummy's Tomb	April 1, 2015	Kirby Heyborne	3 hours and 19 minutes	1-467-69683-8
Lost in an Egyptian pyramid, twelve-year-old Gabe and his cousin Sari find they are not alone.
02	The Haunted Mask	April 1, 2015	Jorjeana Marie	2 hours and 28 minutes	1-522-65181-0
When she discovers an evil mask at the bottom of a trunk and puts it on, LuAnn's Halloween turns into a real nightmare because only an act of unbelievable kindness can remove it.
03	Night of the Living Dummy	April 1, 2015	Carol Schneider	2 hours and 50 minutes	1-522-65194-2
Lindy and Kris become interested in ventriloquism, but they hardly suspect that Kris' new dummy has a mind of its own.
04	Vampire Breath	April 1, 2015	Vikas Adam	2 hours and 33 minutes	1-522-65210-8
Exploring his basement, Freddy and his friend Cara discover a mysterious bottle labeled "vampire breath" and accidentally break it open, unleashing a very thirsty Count Nightwing on the town.
05	Welcome to Dead House	April 1, 2015	Tara Sands	2 hours and 42 minutes	1-522-65211-6
Amanda and Josh move with their parents into an old haunted house located in the strange town of Dark Falls where people are unlike any they have known before.
06	The Werewolf of Fever Swamp	April 1, 2015	Ramon de Ocampo	2 hours and 25 minutes	1-522-65212-4
When a strange howling is heard and a rabbit is torn to shreds, everyone thinks that Grady's new dog is responsible, and Grady is determined to prove them wrong.
07	The Ghost Next Door	August 1, 2015	Emily Eiden	2 hours and 26 minutes	1-522-65179-9
When an odd new boy moves in next door, Hannah's neighborhood starts to get more and more eerie, and she suspects that the pale boy must be a ghost.
08	Monster Blood	August 1, 2015	Kirby Heyborne	3 hours and 1 minute	1-522-65192-6
Evan visits an eerie old toy store and buys a dusty can of Monster Blood. But then he notices something weird about the slimy green ooze. It keeps growing. And growing. And growing. And all that growing has given the Monster Blood a monstrous appetite.
09	Say Cheese and Die!	August 1, 2015	Johnny Heller	2 hours and 34 minutes	1-522-65202-7
Greg thinks there is something wrong with the old camera he found. The photos keep turning out... different. When Greg takes a picture of his father's brand-new car, it's wrecked in the photo. And then his dad crashes the car.It's like the camera can tell the future--or worse. Maybe it makes the future!
10	Night of the Living Dummy 2	September 1, 2015	Renee Dorian	2 hours and 30 minutes	1-522-65198-5
Amy's ventriloquist dummy, Dennis, has lost his head...for real. So Amy begs her family for a new dummy. That's when her dad finds Slappy in a local pawnshop. Slappy's kind of ugly, but at least his head stays on! Amy loves practicing her new comedy routine. It's like this dummy knows what she's thinking. Like he can move by himself. And it's a lot of fun...until Slappy starts a routine of his own. A nasty, horrible routine that isn't funny at all. Slappy may have a new owner, but he's up to the same old tricks...
11	One Day at HorrorLand	September 1, 2015	Tara Sands	2 hours and 35 minutes	1-522-65197-7
Werewolf Village. The Doom Slide. The Coffin Cruise. These are just a few of the terrifying attractions that await Luke and Lizzy Morris at HorrorLand. Step right up and join the Morris family as they ride each ride - and scream each scream - for the very first time. Because it might also be their last.
12	The Scarecrow Walks at Midnight	September 1, 2015	Lexy Fridell	2 hours and 52 minutes	1-522-65186-1
Jodie loves visiting her grandparents' farm. Okay, so it's not the most exciting place in the world. Still, Grandpa tells great scary stories. And Grandma's chocolate chip cookies are the best. But this summer the farm has really changed. The cornfields are sparse. Grandma and Grandpa seem worn out. And the single scarecrow has been replaced by twelve evil-looking ones. Then one night Jodie sees something really odd. The scarecrows seem to be moving. Twitching on their stakes. Coming alive...
13	Return of the Mummy	October 1, 2015	Kirby Heyborne	2 hours and 38 minutes	1-522-65200-0
After last year's scary adventure, Gabe's a little nervous about being back in Egypt. Back near the ancient pyramids. Back where he saw all those creepy mummies. Then he learns about an Egyptian superstition. A secret chant that is supposed to bring mummies back to life. Gabe's uncle says it's just a hoax. But now it sounds like something's moving in the mummy's tomb. No way can a couple of dumb words wake the dead. Can they?
14	Revenge of the Lawn Gnomes	October 1, 2015	Maxwell Glcik	2 hours and 42 minutes	1-467-61986-8
Two pink flamingos. A whole family of plaster skunks. Joe Burton's dad loves those tacky lawn ornaments. But then he brings home two ugly lawn gnomes. And that's when the trouble starts. Late at night, when everyone's asleep, someone's creeping in the garden. Whispering nasty things. Smashing melons. Squashing tomatoes. No way two dumb, old lawn ornaments could be causing all the trouble. Is there?
15	Stay Out of the Basement	October 1, 2015	Elizabeth Morton	2 hours and 40 minutes	1-522-65206-X
Dr. Brewer is doing a little plant testing in his basement. Nothing to worry about. Harmless, really. But Margaret and Casey Brewer are worried about their father. Especially when they...meet...some of the plants he is growing down there. Then they notice that their father is developing plantlike tendencies. In fact he is becoming distinctly weedy - and seedy. Is it just part of their father's "harmless" experiment? Or has the basement turned into another little shop of horrors?

== Goosebumps SlappyWorld (2017–2021) ==
The next line of audiobooks were adapted from the Goosebumps SlappyWorld series for Audible audio downloads, preloaded digital audio players and unabridged multi-disc audio sets through Scholastic Audiobooks.

#	Title	Original published date	Narrator	Length	ISBN
01	Slappy Birthday to You	March 14, 2017	Joe Fria, Lucien Dodge	2 hours and 51 minutes	1-536-68182-2
It's bad enough Ian Barker has to spend his twelfth birthday with his sister and their two annoying cousins. The four of them can't ever hang out without getting into trouble. Vinnie and Jonny always want to play with Ian's stuff. They take extra turns and break everything they touch. Even Ian's new birthday presents are up for grabs. But when Ian gets a Slappy dummy from his dad, things go from bad to worse. When Slappy's in charge, you don't fight over him, he fights over you!
02	Attack of the Jack	June 27, 2017	Joe Fria, Tarah Consoli	3 hours and 17 minutes	1-338-06836-9
Devin and his sister Violet are visiting their Uncle Jack for the summer. He lives in an old house by the seashore. Jack was a sailor and he has collected strange and fascinating items from the sea. Exploring a back room, Devin and Violet discover a locked trunk. A pirate's chest. The trunk is wrapped in old, heavy chains and locked with a huge rusted lock. But they manage to get it open. They lift the lid slowly -- and see that it's filled with antique jack-in-the-boxes. Huh? One box is hidden under the others, covered in dust. It plays an odd, unpleasant song. Up pops a very ugly, mean-looking puppet, an old pirate with a dirty red bandana over his long greasy hair, scars on his cheeks, and a beard -- and one eye missing. "Thanks for letting Sailor Jack out!" he rasps, bouncing on his spring. Devin and Violet now face new and troubling questions: Will Jack return them to their uncle? Just how much is a pirate's promise worth?
03	I Am Slappy's Evil Twin	September 26, 2017	Joe Fria, Aaron Landon, P.J. Ochlan	2 hours and 50 minutes	1-509-46004-7
Luke Harrison's dad makes horror movies. It's very fun to be around such scary stuff-especially when you have your own monster museum at home. But when two ventriloquist dummies join the collection, things get real creepy. Real-life creepy! Slappy and Snappy can walk and talk on their own. And they can make you scream on their own. They have a plan to make everyone's lives miserable. Will Luke be able to stop this terrible twin twosome?
04	Please Do Not Feed the Weirdo	February 27, 2018	Joe Fria, Maxwell Glick	2 hours and 40 minutes	1-509-46718-1
Robby and his sister Karla beg their parents to take them to a big carnival that has opened on the other side of town. When they arrive, the two kids are delighted by the rides, the sideshow, the interesting displays, and the great food booths. They wander away from their parents and find themselves at a less-trafficked area at the back of the carnival. Inside a large penned-in area, they see a dejected-looking boy about their age sitting on the grass. A sign on the tall metal fence reads: PLEASE DO NOT FEED THE WEIRDO. The kids are reluctant to disobey the sign, but the boy seems really nice. Karla hands him her cone through the fence. He thanks her very politely. He eats the ice cream, delicately at first, then ravenously, noisily - and as Robby and Karla stare in horror, he transforms into a raging, hairy beast.
05	Escape From Shudder Mansion	June 26, 2018	Joe Fria, Matt Braver	2 hours and 42 minutes	1-509-48341-1
In an old-fashioned "trapped-in-a-haunted-house" story, twins Riley and Scarlett receive an interesting assignment from their teacher, Mrs. Stermon. Everyone in class needs to do a documentary video about an adventure, something exciting that they experienced. Mrs. Stermon gives them a suggestion, along with their friends Carter, Lee, Danitia, and Mia. She shows them a brochure about a scary old house on the edge of town, called Shudder Mansion. "If you six kids and your parents can stay there overnight, you'll all get A's," says the teacher. "I'll even give you extra credit." Just how scary is Shudder Mansion? It's terrifying.
06	The Ghost of Slappy	September 25, 2018	Joe Fria, Austin Rising	2 hours and 52 minutes	1-987-14391-4
Slappy's back as a ghost! And this time, the only thing you'll play is hide-and-go-shriek!
07	It's Alive! It's Alive!	March 1, 2019	Joe Fria, Stephanie Drake	2 hours and 58 minutes	1-987-15636-6
Livvy and Jayden are the stars of their school's robotics team. Livvy is especially enthusiastic because her own mother works in a robotics lab and experiments with Artificial Intelligence. To impress her mom, Livvy and Jayden build a robot. Livvy wants to name their robot "Francine," but Jayden thinks that's too silly for their creation. Desperate to win, Livvy and Jayden "borrow" an Artificial Intelligence module. They soon realize they've made a terrible mistake. Francine has too much brain power. She's alive! And using this newly gained brain power to dream up a deadly contest!
08	The Dummy Meets the Mummy	July 9, 2019	Joe Fria, Thom Rivera, Jay Aaseng, Rachel Jacobs	2 hours and 49 minutes	1-987-16219-6
After being put back to sleep and abandoned in an old museum, Slappy is brought to life by a curious girl on a school trip. Out for revenge, Slappy uses his powers to raise an army of creatures from the exhibits. But when the museum closes, Slappy and his new friends are locked inside with Arragatis, an ancient mummy with his own plan for revenge. It's dummy versus mummy as Slappy faces his most dangerous and frightening opponent yet! Can Slappy defeat this ancient adversary? Or will it be a wrap for this dummy?
09	Revenge of the Invisible Boy	October 1, 2019	Joe Fria, Ramon deOcampo	2 hours and 45 minutes	1-987-16248-X
Frankie Miller and his friends have a Magic Club. They meet every week to learn new tricks and perform for each other. It's supposed to be fun, but there's always one problem: Ari Goodwin. He's a pest! He ruins their tricks and makes fun of them. When Frankie's friend Melody Richmond finds a recipe in an old book to turn a person invisible, they decide to try it out on Ari. But he's on to them. He's switched the cups and now Frankie's the one who's invisible. There must be an antidote in the book, but Melody can't find it. It's missing! Now Frankie is changing. He's angry and he wants revenge. Can Melody find the antidote or will Frankie's greatest trick turn everyone invisible?
10	Diary of a Dummy	March 4, 2020	Joe Fria	2 hours and 27 minutes	1-094-25796-6
Reading someone's diary is bad but Slappy is already evil, so how could anyone resist finding out all of this dummy's terrifying secrets? Zoey and Billy Traister find a large suitcase in a trash pile in the empty lot behind their house. Inside: a grinning ventriloquist dummy. Who would throw out a perfectly good dummy? They bring it home and quickly find out why the dummy was tossed in the trash. They read the secret words and bring Slappy to life, who treats them to an evening of true horror; trashes their house; insults them; hurts them; orders them to become his servants. The Traister kids grab him and struggle to force him back into his case. They carry the case back to the empty lot and heave it onto the trash pile. When they return home, they discover something fell out of the case - a diary. Slappy's diary.
11	They Call me the Night Howler!	July 7, 2020	Joe Fria, Michael Gallagher	2 hours and 42 minutes	1-094-29135-8
Mason Brady loves comics! He knows every hero, villain, and sidekick. He even draws his own characters. On a trip to his favorite place, the Comic Book Characters Hall of Fame Museum, Mason explores every exhibit. He even comes across the very real Night Howler. But when villains start terrorizing the town, Mason realizes that his whole life is about to change. Will Mason be a superhero or a superzero?
12	My Friend Slappy	October 6, 2020	Joe Fria	2 hours and 50 minutes	1-338-35577-5
Barton Suggs becomes friends with Slappy after he's brought to school for a class presentation and they team-up to take down the school.
13	Monster Blood Is Back	March 2, 2021	Joe FriaJoe Fria, Cassandra Morris	2 hours and 45 minutes	1-338-35579-1
Sascha and Nicole buy a mysterious can called Monster Blood to get back at Ashli and Diggs, who were the school cheaters in the competition, but as the Monster Blood start growing and growing, things started to get out of control.
14	Fifth Grade Zombies	July 6, 2021	Joe Fria, Pierce Cravens	2 hours and 37 minutes	1-338-35581-3
Zombie fans Scarlett and her friends likes to terrorizing people in the neighborhood, but when a woman named Granny Z moves into the creepy, old, abandoned house at the bottom of the hill, things get rotten for the zombie club.
15	Judy and the Beast	September 7, 2021	Joe Fria, Emily Lawrence	2 hours and 50 minutes	1-338-75214-6
Judy Glassman lives with her brother Kenny and father Noah in a village at the foot of Evil Rock. Every winter, Kenny accompanies their dad up to the mansion at the top of the mountain to assist the rich, eccentric Grendel family with their house repairs. But this year, Judy convinces dad to let her come too. Judy has heard whispers about the Beast of Evil Rock -- a half-human creature who stalks the crags. And she's determined to find out for herself if it's true. Will Judy discover the secret of Evil Rock before the Beast finds her first?

== See also ==
- Fear Street
- List of Goosebumps books
- Gooflumps
