= The Haunted Mask (Goosebumps episode) =

- Goosebumps episodes
- Cover of the VHS released in 1996
- Episode nos.: Season 1 Episodes 1 & 2
- Directed by: Timothy Bond
- Teleplay by: José Rivera
- Based on: The Haunted Mask by R. L. Stine
- Presented by: R. L. Stine
- Cinematography by: Brian R. R. Hebb
- Editing by: Robert K. Sprogis
- Original air dates: October 27, 1995 (U.S.); October 28, 1995 (Canada)

Episode chronology
← Previous —	Next → "The Cuckoo Clock of Doom"

"The Haunted Mask" is the feature-length series premiere of the television series Goosebumps. The episode is based on the book of the same name by R. L. Stine and is about Carly Beth, a timid girl who buys a rubber mask for Halloween that soon begins merging with her face. It first aired on October 27, 1995, in the United States on the Fox network, where it was viewed by 7.9 million households. In Canada, where the episode was filmed, it aired one day later on the YTV network. At the time, it had almost 3 million viewers and was YTV's highest-rated episode. Kathryn Long, who played Carly Beth, obtained a Gemini Award nomination for "Best Performance in a Children's or Youth Program or Series".

"The Haunted Mask" was released on VHS on March 12, 1996. Billboard ranked the VHS as the 75th bestselling home video of 1996. More than 2.5 million units of the VHS had been sold by August 1996.

== Plot ==
Carly Beth Caldwell (Kathryn Long) is repeatedly scared by two classmates, Chuck Greene (Amos Crawley) and Steve Boswell (George Davis). On Halloween, they fool her into eating a sandwich that contains a worm. In anger, Carly Beth runs home and ruins the duck costume her mother (Brenda Bazinet) made for her. She decides to go to a mask shop hoping to find something that will scare Chuck and Steve. In the store, she finds a back room filled with some hideous masks. One mask grabs her attention: a green mask with a bulging, bald head, a broad, flat nose, pointy ears, dark lips, and sharp fangs. The store's owner (Colin Fox) refuses to sell any of the masks, so Carly Beth steals the green one and tosses money to him before leaving. At home, she uses the mask to frighten her brother, Noah (Cody Jones). She has trouble taking the mask off, and when it finally comes off, she and Noah are unsure about how she unintentionally changed her voice. After putting on the mask again, Carly Beth takes a mold of her head that her mother made for her and leaves the house to meet her best friend, Sabrina Mason (Kathryn Short).

Carly Beth starts to act differently: she frightens other children, throws candy onto the ground and destroys Halloween decorations. After scaring Chuck and Steve, she buries the mold of her head. While at Sabrina's house, Carly Beth is shocked to find she is unable to remove the mask as it seems to have become part of her skin. She goes back to the mask shop to find the owner waiting for her. The shop owner tells Carly Beth that the mask is a real face and the only way to remove it is with a "symbol of love". He explains that he created the faces to hide his faults, but the faults were internalized, resulting in the faces becoming deformed. Carly Beth begins to cry out in horror, awakening the other masks who begin to pursue her. Chased by the other masks, she runs to the cemetery and digs up the mold her mother gave her. Carly Beth uses the mold to deter the other masks and is able to remove the mask from her face. She returns home to her mother, tossing the mask near the door. Carly Beth is horrified to see Noah wearing the mask upon his return.

== Production ==
The episode is based on The Haunted Mask, the 11th book in the original Goosebumps series written by R. L. Stine and published by Scholastic. When Stine appeared at the top of the USA Today bestseller list in 1994, Margaret Loesch, the CEO of Fox Kids at the time, took notice. She bought her son a copy of the Goosebumps book Say Cheese and Die! and his positive response to it led her to offer Scholastic a TV deal for the series.

Filming for the Goosebumps TV series, including "The Haunted Mask", began in 1995 in Toronto, Ontario, Canada. Producer Steve Levitan said the horror elements of the episode were toned down because of concerns about "the broad demographic appeal" and the "much younger kids" who would be part of the audience. When they filmed the scene in which Carly Beth bites into the sandwich with a worm in it, they originally planned on using a rubber worm. However, they used a real worm at the insistence of actress Kathryn Long, who played Carly Beth. The scene had to be shot 12 times.

== Release ==
"The Haunted Mask" first aired during primetime on October 27, 1995, in the United States on the Fox network, and one day later in Canada on the YTV network as the series premiere of the Goosebumps TV series. The episode is hosted by R. L. Stine, who is featured in the mask shop that appears in the episode.

"The Haunted Mask" was released on VHS on March 12, 1996, by 20th Century Fox Home Entertainment; this VHS contained a preview of the production for the Goosebumps episode "A Night in Terror Tower" and a bookmark. Billboard listed the VHS as the 75th bestselling home video of 1996, the only Goosebumps video on the list. It was also listed as the 12th bestselling children's video for the same year. The VHS had sold 500 thousand copies one week after its release, and 2.5 million copies by August 10, 1996.

A sequel to the episode, titled "Haunted Mask II", first aired on October 29, 1996. It was based on the similarly titled 36th installment of the Goosebumps series that was released in October 1995. In this story, Steve, not interested in wearing his mother's homemade pirate costume, finds and puts on a mask with the visage of an old man with spiders in his hair. John White replaced George Davis as Steve in "Haunted Mask II".

== Themes ==
"The Haunted Mask" has themes of peer taunting and family frustrations. The desire to fit in and peer pressure causes Carly Beth to behave in a disturbing manner because, according to Michelle Erica Green from FamilyWonder.com, she does not appreciate her positive qualities. Children's Video Report wrote that at its conclusion, Carly Beth has to "learn to love and accept herself if she is to find happiness." The Chicago Tribune's Scott Blakey stated that the episode reveals "the dark side of childhood cruelty toward those who find themselves out of step with their peers or the in-group."

== Reception ==
In the United States, "The Haunted Mask" received a Nielsen rating of 8.2 and a 16 percent audience share, which means it was viewed in 8.2 percent of all households with a TV or about 7.9 million households in total. The episode was ranked 62nd in ratings for the week of October 23–29, and ranked third in its time slot. In Canada, "The Haunted Mask" was YTV's highest-rated episode up to that point, with nearly three million viewers. It had more viewers than its competition on CBC, CTV, and Global during its time slot.

In 2012, R. L. Stine said "The Haunted Mask" was his favorite Goosebumps episode. Scott Blakey from the Chicago Tribune stated that, properly presented, "The Haunted Mask" is "a cautionary tale that will thrill viewers 10 and older", but "it has the power to spook younger children." Frazier Tharpe, Brendan Klinkenberg, and Khal from Complex.com named it the 10th best Halloween themed TV episode and called it one of the scariest Goosebumps episodes. They stated that the "sight of conflicted Carly Beth burying a mold of her real face in the cemetery while the Haunted Mask becomes snarlingly real was, and still is, shockingly unsettling for a kids horror series." FamilyWonder.com's Michelle Erica Green, who gave the episode a C rating, thought that "The Haunted Mask" had genuinely scary and exciting scenes, but felt it had stereotypical characters and a corny feel-good message which weakened its impact. She stated that some of the special effects were hokey as well. In 1997, Kathryn Long received a Gemini Award nomination for "Best Performance in a Children's or Youth Program or Series" for her work on the episode.
