= Goosebumps: Escape from Horrorland =

1996 video game

- Developer: DreamWorks Interactive
- Publisher: DreamWorks Interactive
- Director: Lawrence Guterman
- Series: Goosebumps
- Platform: Windows
- Release: NA: 1996
- Genre: Interactive movie
- Mode: Single-player

Escape from Horrorland is a Goosebumps video game that was released in 1996. Attack of the Mutant and Goosebumps HorrorLand are other video games of the series. The game has Jeff Goldblum making a special appearance as Dracula and Isabella Rossellini as Lady Cadaver.

== Plot summary ==
The game acts as a sequel to the Goosebumps book, One Day at HorrorLand. Lizzy, one of the protagonists from the book, calls the player character to her that night, stating that her brother Luke and his friend Clay have suddenly disappeared after a strange bout of supernatural activity in her household. The only clues she has are the Horrorland tickets they got from their last encounter with the theme park. Heading back to her house, the tickets suddenly glow and suck the player character and Lizzy back to Horrorland. Stuck there and having no choice, the both of them go in search of Luke and Clay in hopes of finding an exit to the haunted theme park, along the way learning the origins of the park as well as the creator, Madison Storm, who built the park based on his own twisted childhood.

After making their way through the park finding Luke and Clay, gathering items to continue, and warding off the monsters that wish to harm them – the player makes it near the end to discover Madison also kidnapped Mr. and Mrs. Morris (Lizzy's parents) and wishes to destroy the family, both as a spectacle for the monsters of the park as well as revenge for escaping the park the first time and making him look like a fool in front of the monster inhabitants. Clay manages to reach the monster generator, the device that attracted monsters to the park, and overload it causing the inhabitants to flee but in the midst of the chaos Madison grabs the Morris siblings and Clay and ties them up, intending them to be blown up along with the park. The player character manages to save everyone, prevent the park from blowing up and defeat Madison all at once. Clay, however, finds the remote to the park and presses one of the buttons, triggering the self-destruction of the park. The kids manage to get out in time before it blows.

The final scene in the game sees the kids make it home; in the good ending, the parents make it back safe and greet the kids as they come home with the help of their new neighbor, Maddie, who is revealed to be Madison Storm. In the bad ending, however, Mr. and Mrs. Morris are turned into Horrorland Horrors, to the shock of Lizzy and Luke.

== Development and release ==
This game features well-known actors including Adam Wylie, Eric Lloyd, Isabella Rossellini and Jeff Goldblum. It was directed by Lawrence Guterman, who went on to direct Cats & Dogs (2001) and Son of the Mask (2005). All Post production audio services including: VO editing, Dialog Mixing, Sound design, music editing, original music and final mixes were done by John March and his company at the time - The Interactive Audio Group.

== Reception ==
In the United States, PC Data named Escape from Horrorland the 11th-best-selling computer game of December 1996. The game ultimately reached domestic sales of 130,000 units by August 1997, which made it DreamWorks Interactive's highest-selling game by that time. Leslie Helm of the Los Angeles Times called it "a modest success". Escape from HorrorLand was a finalist for the Computer Game Developers Conference's 1996 "Best Adaptation of Linear Media" Spotlight Award, but lost the prize to I Have No Mouth, and I Must Scream.
