= An Old Story =

An Old Story may refer to:

- "An Old Story", an episode of Goosebumps (1995 TV series)
- "An Old Story", an episode of Jumanji (TV series)
- "An Old Story", an episode of Mopatop's Shop
- "An Old Story", an essay in The Portable Atheist
- An Old Story: A Temperance Tale in Verse, 1875 work by Samuel Carter Hall

== See also ==
- Sag Harbor (play) – 1899 play by James Herne, subtitled "An Old Story
- Several works by Margot Zemach subtitled "An Old Story"
- Same Old Story
