= Tara Sands =

American voice actress

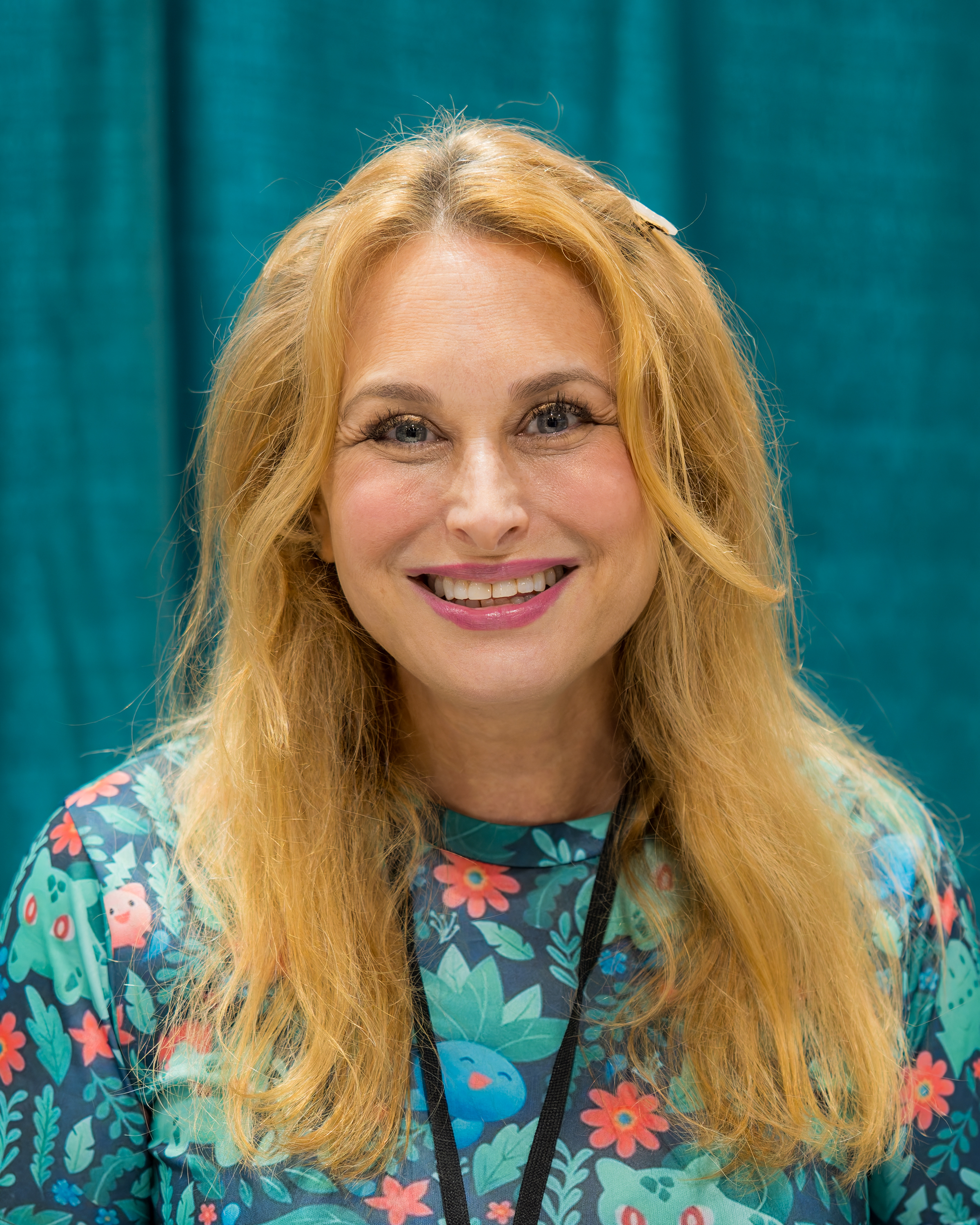
- Sands at Animate! Orlando in 2026
- Other name: Tara Jayne
- Occupations: Voice actress; television host
- Years active: 1998–present
- Website: www.tarasands.com

Tara Sands is an American voice actress who was co-host of Cartoon Network's Fridays from 2005 to 2007. Sands has voiced in anime dubs and cartoons, including Bulbasaur in the Pokémon anime series, Spyler in I Spy, Kari Kamiya in Digimon Adventure tri., Anna Kyoyama in Shaman King, Mokuba Kaiba in Yu-Gi-Oh! Duel Monsters, as well as Chase on Fighting Foodons and Filia Ul Copt in Slayers. She also provides narration on audio books.

== Biography ==
Much of Sands' work is in anime dubbing, with multiple roles in franchises such as Pokémon, Slayers, Yu-Gi-Oh!, Digimon Adventure Tri, and Hunter x Hunter. She has worked for 4Kids Entertainment, Bang Zoom!, Funimation, TAJ Productions, NYAV Post, Studiopolis, Central Park Media, and VSI Los Angeles.

Sands has narrated over 300 audio books, including Wendelin Van Draanen's Sammy Keyes series, After I Do by Taylor Jenkins Reid, and two books in the Goosebumps series by R. L. Stine: Welcome to Dead House and One Day at HorrorLand.

In addition to providing voice-overs for commercials, Sands was co-host of Cartoon Network Fridays for over 100 episodes.

As of 2021, Sands provides the voice for "sidekick" Joan of Arc in the Forever Dog podcast Godcast.

Sands hosts a podcast about 4Kids Entertainment called 4Kids Flashback.

== Filmography ==
=== Live action ===
- Disjointed – Sadie, Plants (voice)
- Fridays (Cartoon Network) – Co-Host
- Everybody Hates Chris – Hotel Clerk, Waitress
- The Fresh Beat Band – Interviewer
- The Sarah Silverman Program – Campaign Manager
- The Newsroom – Secretary

=== Anime ===
- Agent Aika – Ria
- Angel Sanctuary – Sara Mudo
- Anohana: The Flower We Saw That Day – Jinta "Jintan" Yodomi (Child)
- Beyblade Burst Turbo – Tobisuke
- Descendants of Darkness – Princess Tsubaki
- Digimon Adventure: – Biyomon
- Digimon Adventure Tri – Kari
- Digimon Beatbreak – Rose, Izumi
- Domain of Murder – Keita Toyama
- Durarara!! – Masaomi Kida (Young), Additional Voices
- Fencer of Minerva – Diana
- Fighting Foodons – Chase
- Geobreeders – Eiko Rando
- Ghost Talker's Daydream – Anzai
- Girls Bravo – Nanase Koh Haruka, Reporter (Ep. 21)
- The God of High School – Sai, Sumi Yoo
- High School Prodigies Have It Easy Even in Another World – Winona
- Hunter × Hunter – Biscuit Krueger
- Isekai Cheat Magician – Lemia, Aerial
- JoJo's Bizarre Adventure – Death 13, Old Hag (Bastet arc)
- Jujutsu Kaisen – Utahime Iori, Momo Nishimiya
- Jungle Emperor Leo – Lune/Rune
- Knights of Ramune – PQ
- Kirby: Right Back at Ya! – Fololo, Falala (4Kids Version)
- Legend of Himiko – Tadami
- Little Witch Academia – Woodward, Lotte's Mother, Party Guest
- Maze – Solude Schfoltzer
- Mobile Suit Gundam Thunderbolt – Karla Mitchum
- My Hero Academia – Curious
- Naruto Shippuden – Yota, Tamao, Young Kabuto (Ep. 335 and 336)
- No Guns Life – Anne
- One Piece – Miss Kaya (4Kids dub)
- One Punch Man – Kombu Infinity
- Patlabor: The Mobile Police – Takeo Kumagami
- Photon – Aun Freya
- Pokémon – multiple characters including Bulbasaur, Phanpy, Larvitar, Clefairy, Yamper, Bugsy, Jasmine, Cissy, Ritchie
- Pretty Guardian Sailor Moon Crystal – Kotono Sarashina (Eps. 15 and 18)
- Rayearth – Hikaru Shidou
- Rent-A-Girlfriend – Imai
- Revolutionary Girl Utena – Tokiko Chida
- Rurouni Kenshin – Seta Sōjirō, Osamu Masukami (as Tara Jayne)
- Saint Seiya: The Lost Canvas – Yuzuriha
- Samurai Deeper Kyo – Santera
- The Seven Deadly Sins – Luigi
- Shaman King – Anna Kyoyama, Opacho
- Shamanic Princess – Tiara
- Shrine of the Morning Mist – Tadahiro Amatsu (Child), Tama Hieda
- Shura no Toki: Age of Chaos – Kesshomaru/Shiori
- Sailor Moon – Yumemi Yumeno (Ep. 28, Viz Media dub)
- Slayers Try - Filia Ul Copt (as Tara Jayne)
- Spirit Warrior - Asura
- Stitch! - Audrey
- Tiger & Bunny - Ms. Violet
- Time Bokan - Ohana, Yatterman (1&2)
- To Heart - Multi
- T・P Bon - Yumiko Yasukawa, Mrs. Namihira
- Ultraman – Rena Sayama
- Yu-Gi-Oh! Duel Monsters – Mokuba Kaiba
- Yashahime: Princess Half-Demon – Raita

=== Animation ===
- Barbie: Life in the Dreamhouse – Summer
- Barbie Dreamhouse Adventures – Dreamhouse Door
- Danger Rangers – Additional Voices
- Electric City – Roger Moore
- Enchantimals: Tales of Everwilde – Danessa Deer, Larissa Lemer
- Funky Cops – Additional voices
- Generator Rex – Circe
- Ghostforce – Ms. Jones
- I Spy – Spyler (as Tara Jayne)
- Pinkfong Wonderstar – Jeni and Rachel
- Shadow of the Elves – Nayade, Rowan
- Supernormal – Buzz Girl, Eric's Mom
- Rainbow High – Ruby Anderson, Ms. Pamela Morton
- Team Umizoomi – Horse
- Teenage Mutant Ninja Turtles – Angel (Season 1–4), Tyler
- Valt the Wonder Deer – Trika
- Welcome to Eltingville – Jane

=== Films ===
- Ah! My Goddess: The Movie – Chrono
- Digimon Adventure tri. – Kari Kamiya (Hikari Yagami), Homeostasis
- Digimon Adventure: Last Evolution Kizuna – Kari Kamiya (Hikari Yagami), Ayaka, Newswoman
- Digimon Adventure 02: The Beginning – Kari Kamiya (Hikari Yagami)
- Ice Age: Continental Drift – Additional Voices
- Jujutsu Kaisen 0 – Momo Nishimiya
- My Kid Could Paint That – Voice Over Talent
- Pokémon: Destiny Deoxys – Tory Lund
- Scooby-Doo! Stage Fright – Nancy
- Sailor Moon Super S: The Movie – Queen Badiane (Viz Media/Studiopolis Dub)
- The Orbital Children – Mina Misasa
- Time of Eve – Naoko Sakisaka
- Yu-Gi-Oh!: The Dark Side of Dimensions – Mokuba Kaiba

=== Video games ===
- Cobra Kai: The Karate Kid Saga Continues - Yasmine, Lindsey
- Danganronpa Another Episode: Ultra Despair Girls – Masaru Daimon
- Dead Island – Jin, Various Characters
- Digimon Story: Time Stranger – Hiroko Sagisaka, additional voices
- Final Fantasy Type-0 – Additional Voices
- Generator Rex: Agent of Providence - Circe
- Infamous Second Son – Activist
- Lightning Returns: Final Fantasy XIII – Additional Voices
- Pokémon Channel – Smoochum, Teddiursa
- Scarlet Nexus - Additional voices
- Singularity – Additional English Voice Talent
- Valkyria Chronicles 4 – Teresa Leach, Rebecca Longhurst, Rosie
- Fire Emblem Echoes: Shadows of Valentia – Sonya
- Fire Emblem Heroes – Sonya, Olwen (Righteous Knight)
- Fire Emblem Warriors: Three Hopes – Additional voices
- Nier: Automata – Additional voices
- Nier Replicant ver.1.22474487139... – Red-Bag Woman, additional voices
- One-Punch Man: A Hero Nobody Knows - Child Emperor
- Relayer - Additional voices
- Resident Evil: Resistance - Becca Woolett
- Story of Seasons: Grand Bazaar - Rebecca, Player G

=== Podcasts ===
- Godcast - Joan of Arc
- 4Kids Flashback - Host
