= One Day at HorrorLand =

1994 book by R.L. Stine

One Day at Horrorland
- First edition cover
- Author: R. L. Stine
- Cover artist: Tim Jacobus
- Language: English
- Series: Goosebumps
- Genre: Horror fiction, Children's literature
- Published: Scholastic
- Publication date: February 1994
- Publication place: United States
- Media type: Print
- Pages: 123
- ISBN: 0-590-47738-2
- Preceded by: You Can't Scare Me!
- Followed by: Why I'm Afraid of Bees

One Day at HorrorLand is the sixteenth children's horror novel in R. L. Stine's Goosebumps series, and was originally published in February 1994. It has been adapted to many other media, including television, graphic novels, and videogames. The book received positive reception.

== Plot ==
The Morris family and their friend Clay become lost, accidentally finding the HorrorLand theme park. Shortly after parking, their car explodes, but the ticket-taker reassures them that it will be taken care of. The children, Lizzy, Luke and Clay, explore the theme park and get on the rides. After a ride in which Lizzy is locked in a casket traveling down a river, the three of them attempt to convince the Morris parents, Carl and Peggy, that they all should leave. The two reveal that they experienced similar problems, so they all decide to confront the Horrors, the park's green-suited employees, who resemble green humans with demonic horns.

After the Morris family and Clay discover that the gates have been locked to prevent their escape, the monsters surround them. In anger, Lizzy tries to remove a mask from one of the monsters, which she discovers is actually the Horror's face. The Horrors explain that they are real monsters, and the visitors' experiences were part of a television show airing worldwide on the monster-exclusive Monster Channel. As an apology, the monsters say that they will lead them towards a new car, but they are led to carnivorous animals, still part of the show.

After the family survives the animals' attack, the monsters attempt to murder them. Lizzy then remembers signs within the park that said "No pinching". The visitors proceed to pinch all of the monsters, resulting in them deflating like balloons. The Morris family and Clay escape HorrorLand in a different car, but in a twist ending, find out that a Horror held onto the back of the vehicle until they reached their home. Impressed by their escape, the monster offers them free passes for their next visit.

== Publications and adaptations ==
The book was originally published in February 1994. The cover artist Tim Jacobus sketched 2 covers with pencil before the final sketching and then completed a color mockup. A sketch cover depicts Lizzy, Luke and Clay riding on a roller coaster. The author of The Art of Goosebumps, Sarah Rodriguez, wrote that "Jacobus used blues and muted greens to suggest loneliness and abandonment with the amusement park lit slightly with orange to hint that night is falling". Rodriguez said, "The overall effect is creepy without being overtly so." It was a USA Today bestseller in March 1994. It was released again in 2011, under the Classic Goosebumps rename. Return to HorrorLand, a sequel to the book and the thirteenth book of the series Goosebumps Series 2000, was released in 1999. Lizzy, Luke, and Clay revisit HorrorLand, so that they can attempt to close the theme park.

=== Adaptations ===
The book was adapted into a two-part episode for the television series, which aired in Fall 1997 and was later released on VHS and DVD. There is also an adult-aimed interactive show based on the book.

A video game titled Goosebumps: Escape from Horrorland was released in 1996, by DreamWorks, for Microsoft Windows. Players encounter film monsters such as Dracula (played by Jeff Goldblum). In a 2008 video game titled Goosebumps HorrorLand, released for the Wii, Nintendo DS and PlayStation 2, the players attempt to escape from the theme park. The book was adapted into a board game titled Goosebumps One Day at HorrorLand Game, which was released by Milton Bradley Company in 1996.

Terror Trips, the second volume of the graphic novel trilogy Goosebumps Graphix, includes an adaptation that was illustrated by Jill Thompson. R. J. Carter, of The Trades, wrote that some panels of the comic were influenced by manga. Jennifer Feigelman, of Kliatt wrote that the comic adaptation within Terror Trips has "frenetic lines and mismatched panel sizing" and is "destined to be a hit with the "tween" crowd".

An audiobook read by Tara Sands was released in 2017. It was one of the books featured in a 2015 interactive show aimed at an adult audience which was beneath London's Waterloo Station in abandoned railway tunnels. Goosebumps HorrorLand is a book series that takes place in HorrorLand.

=== Episodes ===
The book was adapted into a two-part episode for the Goosebumps television series. Airing as episodes eight and nine of the third season, the first episode aired on October 25, 1997, and the second episode aired on November 1, 1997. Both episodes initially aired on Fox Kids. The character Clay was not included in the episodes. A reviewer on DVD Talk wrote, "This two-part episode is largely enjoyable, with some pretty scary moments, though it has a disturbing subtext and an ending that may leave younger children especially feeling squeamish". Jose Prendes, who wrote Viewer Beware! The Goosebumps TV Companion said that the first part has a low budget, but that the episode is "a fun setup for what's to come." Prendes wrote that the first part "is replaced" in the second episode "with a fast-paced, super-cheesy and energetic storyline that manages to turn the whole thing into a comedy." Catherine Mallette of Fort Worth Star-Telegram said, "The "Horrors", who run the park, have cheesy costumes, and the sets are low-budget. But the storyline is extremely compelling." Doug Hamilton and Julie Bookman of The Atlanta Constitution listed the adaptation as one of their picks for television alongside Disney's Tower of Terror.

==== Cast ====
- Heather Brown as Lizzy Morris
- Michael Caloz as Luke Morris
- Jonathan Whittaker as Carl Morris
- Kirsten Bishopric as Peggy Morris
- Neil Crone as Retch Sniff (the host), Blek, and Makeup Artist

== Home media ==
The VHS release of the television episodes was reported as the fourteenth best-selling children's video in the November 14, 1998, issue of Billboard. The VHS, along with two other Goosebumps releases, were advertised on millions of products by General Mills, with coupons and a sweepstakes for a Goosebumps stage production.

The DVD was released in 2008, with no special features. Jeffrey Kauffman, writing for DVD Talk, said that the DVD release is "a completely average television presentation all around" with "typical" sound. The DVD includes a bonus two-part episode titled Welcome to Camp Nightmare.

== Reception ==
Kevin Pires from Flavorwire listed the book as one of his ten favorite Goosebumps books, and Nathan Reese from Complex.com rated One Day at HorrorLand as his ninth favorite book from the series. Reese compared the book's reality television subplot to the film The Truman Show and stated that the idea was "ahead of its time". He also thought that the ending was more dark and humorous than most other books. De Elizabeth of Teen Vogue added the book among the list "20 R.L. Stine Books You Need to Read Again" and said that it "is the best Goosebumps book – and R.L. Stine book in general – of all time, hands down". Elizabeth stated, "The park, called HorrorLand, contains rides like The Werewolf Village and The Doom Slide, and each ride is described in such detail that we all felt like we were actually there." Hank Benjamin of the journal Language Arts Journal of Michigan wrote that he begins every school year by handing a copy of One Day at HorrorLand to read it out-loud with them and holds a discussion with them about the novel and whether there should be a continuation.

== See also ==
- Goosebumps (original series)
- Goosebumps (video game series)

== Books cited ==
- Prendes, Jose (2020). Viewer Beware! The Goosebumps TV Companion. BearManor Media. ISBN 978-1629336121 – via Google Books.
- Rodriguez, Sarah (2021). The Art of Goosebumps. Dynamite Entertainment. p. 44. ISBN 978-1-5241-0692-8 – via Google Books.
