= Be Afraid - Be Very Afraid =

Be Afraid - Be Very Afraid may refer to:

- "Be afraid. Be very afraid.", tagline and quote from The Fly
- "Be afraid. Be very afraid.", tagline and quoted dialog of Wednesday Addams from Addams Family Values
- Be Afraid – Be Very Afraid! (August 1999), book from the Goosebumps Series 2000
- Chonda Pierce: Be Afraid… Be Very Afraid (2002), comedy video by Chonda Pierce
- Be Afraid, Be Very Afraid: The Book of Scary Urban Legends (2004), written by Jan Harold Brunvand
