= Goosebumps (1995 TV series) =

Children's horror anthology television series

- Intertitle for the first and second seasons
- Also known as: Ultimate Goosebumps (season 3)
- Genre: Horror; Fantasy; Adventure; Thriller; Science fiction; Comedy
- Based on: Goosebumps by R.L. Stine
- Developed by: Deborah Forte
- Theme music composer: Jack Lenz
- Composers: Jack Lenz (S1, 3); Brad MacDonald (S2, 4)
- Countries of origin: Canada; United States
- Original language: English
- No. of seasons: 4
- No. of episodes: 74 (list of episodes)

Production
- Executive producer: Deborah Forte
- Producer: Steven S. Levitan
- Production locations: Toronto, Ontario, Canada
- Cinematography: Brian R.R. Hebb (S1–2); Barry Bergthorson (S3–4)
- Running time: 24 minutes (regular); 48 minutes (specials)
- Production companies: Protocol Entertainment; Scholastic Productions

Original release
- Network: Fox Kids (United States); YTV (Canada)
- Release: 27 October 1995 – 16 November 1998

Related
- Goosebumps (2023 TV series)

Goosebumps is a children's horror anthology television series based on R. L. Stine's best-selling book series. It is an anthology of stories involving preteens and young teenagers in otherworldly scenarios. The series focuses on the same supernatural and occult themes as the novels, with most episodes directly adapting the original stories.

== Production ==
In April 1995, it was reported that the Fox Children's Network was in the process of Scholastic to produce an anthology series based on the Goosebumps series of children's horror novels by R. L. Stine under the working title of Goosebumps Theatre to premiere on the 1995 Fall schedule. Fox was expected to premiere the series as the lead-out program for that year's The Simpsons Treehouse of Horror Halloween special.

Goosebumps was filmed largely in Ontario, Canada, with different houses and historic properties in Toronto, Markham, and other outlying rural areas serving often as the sets for each episode rather than constructing artificial houses and buildings. Ontario offered a cost-effective filming location with a versatile aesthetic that could convincingly resemble the U.S. while preserving a sense of geographical ambiguity. Props for the series were designed by Ron Stefaniuk and Alan Doucette, while Stefaniuk retained many of the animatronic props at his own studio after Goosebumps was cancelled.

== Episodes ==
Season	Episodes	Originally released	
Season	Episodes	First released	Last released
1	19	October 27, 1995	May 17, 1996
2	25	May 11, 1996	July 20, 1997
3	22	September 6, 1997	May 16, 1998
4	8	September 14, 1998	November 16, 1998

== Telecast history ==
Goosebumps originally began airing on YTV (in English) from 1995 to 2004, then again in 2016–2017 and Canal Famille (in French) in Canada.

In 2015, and from 13–18 August 2019, the series was aired on Teletoon and Télétoon (Quebec).

Since 2022, Family and WildBrainTV started airing reruns.

In other countries, Fox Kids both in Australia in 1995 and in the U.S. beginning on 27 October 1995 and ending on 16 November 1998, with repeats on Fox Family lasting until 6 September 1999 and 3 September 2001 respectively. Every October from 2007 to 2009, Cartoon Network aired the episodes. From 6 September 2011 until 5 October 2014, Hasbro's partially owned The Hub aired the series. From 2013 onwards, Netflix has streamed all 74 episodes of the TV series on its digital streaming service. In the United Kingdom, it aired on Children's BBC from 1997 to 1999, with repeats aired until 2001. CBBC airings subjected the episodes to heavy censoring, particularly to the twist endings, but the UK Fox Kids channel aired the episodes in mostly uncensored form (except for "A Shocker on Shock Street", which has Mr. Wright's death by electrocution omitted) In the United States, it is also available for streaming on Tubi, The Roku Channel, and Paramount+.

== Marketing ==
To coincide with Fox's release of several tapes from the series, a Halloween 1998 tie-in marketing campaign with General Mills promoted the video series on 10 million packages, and included with each videocassette coupons for candy products such as Fruit Roll-Ups and Gushers.

== Reception ==
According to Billboard, some of the VHS releases were among the best-selling children's videos in November 1998.

== Home media ==
=== VHS releases ===
==== United Kingdom ====
Release name	Release date	Classification	Publisher	Format	Language	Subtitles	Notes	REF
The Haunted Mask	3 March 1997	PG	20th Century Fox Home Entertainment	PAL	English	None		
The Werewolf of Fever Swamp	23 February 1998	12	20th Century Fox Home Entertainment	PAL	English	None	This episode is the only one given a 12 certificate in the UK due to its moderate, supernatural threat and heavy themes/depictions of animals being hunted and killed.	
Night of the Living Dummy III	1 October 1999	PG	20th Century Fox Home Entertainment	PAL	English	None		
Welcome to Camp Nightmare	1 October 1999	PG	20th Century Fox Home Entertainment	PAL	English	None		
A Night in Terror Tower	1 October 1999	PG	20th Century Fox Home Entertainment	PAL	English	None		
Stay Out of the Basement	1 October 1999	PG	20th Century Fox Home Entertainment	PAL	English	None		
The Haunted Mask II	1 October 1999	PG	20th Century Fox Home Entertainment	PAL	English	None		
One Day at HorrorLand	11 October 1999	PG	20th Century Fox Home Entertainment	PAL	English	None		
Return of the Mummy	23 September 2002	PG	20th Century Fox Home Entertainment	PAL	English	None		
Welcome to Dead House	30 September 2002	PG	20th Century Fox Home Entertainment	PAL	English	None		

==== United States ====
Release name	Release date	Classification	Publisher	Stock Number	Format	Language	Subtitles	Notes	REF
The Haunted Mask	12 March 1996	N/A	20th Century Fox Home Entertainment	4461	NTSC	English	None		
Stay Out of the Basement	3 September 1996	N/A	20th Century Fox Home Entertainment	4464	NTSC	English	None		
A Night in Terror Tower	3 September 1996	N/A	20th Century Fox Home Entertainment	4463	NTSC	English	None		
The Werewolf of Fever Swamp	25 March 1997	N/A	20th Century Fox Home Entertainment	4394	NTSC	English	None		
The Haunted Mask II	29 July 1997	N/A	20th Century Fox Home Entertainment	4398	NTSC	English	None		
Welcome to Dead House	23 September 1997	N/A	20th Century Fox Home Entertainment	6040	NTSC	English	None		
Night of the Living Dummy III	13 January 1998	N/A	20th Century Fox Home Entertainment	4399	NTSC	English	None		
The Haunted Mask; A Night in Terror Tower; Stay Out of the Basement	19 May 1998	N/A	20th Century Fox Home Entertainment	4461; 4463; 4464	NTSC	English	None	VHS Pack	
The Werewolf of Fever Swamp; The Haunted Mask II; Welcome to Dead House	19 May 1998	N/A	20th Century Fox Home Entertainment	4394; 4398; 6040	NTSC	English	None	VHS Pack	
Bride of the Living Dummy; An Old Story	15 September 1998	N/A	20th Century Fox Home Entertainment	0498	NTSC	English	None	2 Episode on 1 VHS	
One Day at HorrorLand	15 September 1998	N/A	20th Century Fox Home Entertainment	0496	NTSC	English	None	Part 1 & 2	
Werewolf Skin	15 September 1998	N/A	20th Century Fox Home Entertainment	0497	NTSC	English	None	Part 1 & 2	

=== DVD releases ===
Beginning in 2004, 20th Century Fox Home Entertainment started releasing the series on DVD in individual volumes containing one two-part episode per disc, but later changed sometimes two separate episodes per disc. Later releases included either two discs or multiple episodes on one disc.

==== Original releases ====
(With two episodes per disc, except for Chillogy):

Region 1
DVD title	Season(s)	Episode count	Release date	Episodes
The Haunted Mask II	2	2	7 September 2004	30-31 ("The Haunted Mask II")
Night of the Living Dummy III	2	2	7 September 2004	43-44 ("Night of the Living Dummy III")
Welcome to Dead House	2	2	7 September 2004	39-40 ("Welcome to Dead House")
The Werewolf of Fever Swamp	1	2	7 September 2004	18-19 ("The Werewolf of Fever Swamp")
Cry of the Cat	4	2	12 April 2005	71-72 ("Cry of the Cat")
Deep Trouble	4	2	12 April 2005	73-74 ("Deep Trouble")
How I Got My Shrunken Head	4	2	12 April 2005	67-68 ("How I Got My Shrunken Head")
Chillogy	3	3	6 September 2005	63-65 ("Chillogy")
The Ghost Next Door	4	2	6 September 2005	69-70 ("The Ghost Next Door")
Scary House	3	2	6 September 2005	47 ("The House of No Return") and 54 ("The Haunted House Game")
A Shocker on Shock Street	3	2	5 September 2006	45 ("A Shocker on Shock Street") and 49 ("Click")
My Best Friend Is Invisible	3	2	5 September 2006	50 ("An Old Story") and 46 ("My Best Friend Is Invisible")
Perfect School	3	2	5 September 2006	55-56 ("Perfect School")
It Came from Beneath the Sink!	1, 3	2	11 September 2007	14 ("It Came from Beneath the Sink") and 61 ("Strained Peas")
Night of the Living Dummy	1, 3	2	11 September 2007	10 ("Night of the Living Dummy II") and 60 ("Bride of the Living Dummy")
Say Cheese and Die!	1, 3	2	11 September 2007	15 ("Say Cheese and Die") and 62 ("Say Cheese and Die... Again")

==== Double features ====
On 16 September 2008, twelve of the above sixteen discs were re-released in new double-feature sets, containing the same episodes as before.

Release name	UK release date (region 2)	Australian release date (region 4)	North American release date (region 1)	Notes
Night of the Living Dummy/ How I Got My Shrunken Head	-	-	16 September 2008	
Scary House/ Chillogy	–	–	16 September 2008	
Perfect School/ My Best Friend Is Invisible	–	–	16 September 2008	
It Came from Beneath the Sink/ Deep Trouble	–	–	16 September 2008	
Ghost Next Door/ Shocker on Shock Street	–	–	16 September 2008	
Cry of the Cat/ Say Cheese and Die	–	–	16 September 2008	

==== Revival releases ====
Starting in 2008, new DVD sets were released to coincide with the Goosebumps HorrorLand revival books. These DVDs were a big upgrade from the previous releases, with menus and enhanced audio and picture quality. Unlike the original releases, these sets include three to four 22-minute episodes, instead of two. They also feature new cover art, as opposed to previous releases which used the cover art for the corresponding series book. Many of the previously released titles have been re-released as well, but only new releases are included in this list. Out of all of these DVD releases, 69 out of the 74 episodes have been released on DVD in the United States, excluding "The Haunted Mask" Parts 1 and 2, "Werewolf Skin" Parts 1 and 2, and "The Cuckoo Clock of Doom". "The Haunted Mask" and "Werewolf Skin", however, were previously released on VHS.

Release name	UK release date (region 2)	Australian release date (region 4)	North American release date (region 1)	Notes
A Night in Terror Tower	–	–	16 September 2008	Also contains Stay Out of the Basement
Monster Blood	–	–	16 September 2008	Also contains More Monster Blood, How to Kill a Monster, and The Girl Who Cried Monster
One Day at HorrorLand	–	–	16 September 2008	Also contains Welcome To Camp Nightmare
Return of the Mummy	–	–	31 March 2009	Also contains Don't Wake Mummy and You Can't Scare Me!
The Scarecrow Walks At Midnight	–	–	31 March 2009	Also contains Don't Go To Sleep! and Calling All Creeps
The Headless Ghost	–	–	8 September 2009	Also contains Teacher's Pet and Awesome Ants
Attack of the Jack O'Lanterns	–	–	8 September 2009	Also contains Vampire Breath and Let's Get Invisible!
The Blob That Ate Everyone	–	–	7 September 2010	Also contains Piano Lessons Can Be Murder and My Hairiest Adventure
Go Eat Worms!	–	–	7 September 2010	Also contains Bad Hare Day and Revenge of the Lawn Gnomes
Ghost Beach	–	–	13 September 2011	Also contains The Barking Ghost and Be Careful What You Wish For...
Attack of the Mutant	–	–	13 September 2011	Also contains Phantom of the Auditorium

Release name	UK release date (region 2)	Australian release date (region 4)	North American release date (region 1)	Notes
The Scarecrow Walks at Midnight/ A Night in Terror Tower	–	–	11 September 2012	
The Headless Ghost/ Ghost Beach	–	–	11 September 2012	
One Day at HorrorLand/ Go Eat Worms!	–	–	11 September 2012	

==== Season sets ====
On 26 November 2012, Revelation Films started to release season sets of the series in the United Kingdom (DVD region 2). These releases contained the episodes' mostly uncensored versions as presented on the defunct British Fox Kids channel (albeit still truncating the ending of "A Shocker on Shock Street"); a description on the back of the DVD cases mentions the heavy censoring the episodes were subjected to when they aired on CBBC. Unlike on Fox Kids, all six hour-long specials from across the first and second seasons are presented in their entirety, rather than being split into two-part episodes. Curiously, all the episodes of Season 4 have the Season 2 opening, though their end credits retain the Season 3–4 theme.

Release name	Release date	Notes
Season One	26 November 2012	
Season Two	25 March 2013	
Seasons Three and Four	19 August 2013	
The Complete Collection	28 October 2013	

On 2 April 2014, Madman Entertainment released the entire series in four DVD sets as well as a "Most Wanted Collection" in Australia and New Zealand (DVD region 4).

Release name	Release date	Notes
Season One	4 February 2014	
Season Two	7 May 2014	
Season Three	4 June 2014	
Season Four	9 July 2014	
Goosebumps - Most Wanted	9 July 2014	

=== Online ===
- The complete series is now on iTunes.
- The series was available for streaming on Netflix (North America and United Kingdom).
- The full series is available for free on Tubi in the United States.

== Goosebumps Presents ==
The books in the original Goosebumps series that were made into episodes of the Goosebumps television series were subsequently re-released in a series called Goosebumps Presents. The main difference between the books in this series and their original publications is that the Goosebumps Presents editions contained photos from the corresponding episodes. Eighteen books were released from 1996 to 1998.

No.	Title	Original published date	Pages	ISBN
01	The Girl Who Cried Monster	5 February 1996	57	0-590-74586-7
Telling so many tall-tale monster stories that she is disgusting her friends and family, Lucy Dark does not know what to do when she discovers a "real" monster in the summer reading program librarian.
02	The Cuckoo Clock of Doom	20 May 1996	56	0-590-74587-5
Deciding to get even with his bratty little sister, who always gets him in trouble, Michael Webster fiddles with their father's antique clock, planning to blame Tara, and accidentally sets time backwards.
03	Welcome to Camp Nightmare	15 July 1996	68	0-590-74588-3
Billy Harlan enjoys the days of baseball, archery, and swimming at Camp Nightmoon until a series of strange accidents plague his fellow campers, and Billy begins to suspect that he will be next.
04	Return of the Mummy	2 September 1996	64	0-590-74589-1
Full-color photographs from the television show illustrate the Egyptian adventure of Gabe and his cousin Sari, who find themselves trapped in a mummy's tomb while the mummy is somewhere outside.
05	Night of the Living Dummy II	11 November 1996	56	0-590-74590-5
Slappy, the evil ventriloquist dummy, comes to the home of aspiring young ventriloquist Amy and proves to her that he can walk, talk, and make plenty of trouble all by himself.
06	My Hairiest Adventure	23 December 1996	64	0-590-82519-4
Larry and his friends slap on some tanning lotion found in the garage, believing that they will get great tans (despite being expired), but Larry begins to sprout hair, his friends start to vanish one by one (with their parents denying that they ever existed), and dogs chasing Larry more so than usual.
07	The Headless Ghost	30 December 1996	64	0-590-93954-8
Deciding to go ghost hunting in Hill House, a seaside house said to be haunted, two friends encounter a strange boy who may be the ghost of a boy who was beheaded by a deranged sea captain.
08	Be Careful What You Wish for	6 January 1997	59	0-590-93955-6
Sick of being bullied and being a total klutz, Samantha is granted three wishes after helping a strange lady in black find her way home, but Samantha discovers that the wishes granted to her have a nasty way of backfiring.
09	Go Eat Worms!	10 February 1997	56	0-590-93959-9
Todd's worm obsession turns sticky (and slimy) when his test subjects begin stalking him.
10	Bad Hare Day	17 March 1997	57	0-590-93960-2
Tim Swanson loves Amaz-O the magician so much that he steals a bag of the performer's tricks, and soon Tim's life is taken over by a talking rabbit with an evil mind and shameless scruples.
11	Let's Get Invisible!	28 April 1997	58	0-590-93968-8
Discovering a strange, magic mirror that enables them to become invisible, Max and his friends are delighted until it becomes increasingly difficult for them to become visible again.
12	Attack of the Mutant	26 May 1997	63	0-590-93969-6
Skipper Matthews adores comic books, especially those featuring the evil supervillain Masked Mutant, until he is drawn into a terrifying adventure and must save the world from the sinister schemes of the Masked Mutant himself.
13	Ghost Beach	2 June 1997	59	0-590-29994-8
Exploring a cave by the beach, Jerry and his sister Terri ignore the warnings of local kids Sam and Louisa that the cave is haunted until they find out that the ghosts on the beach are closer than they think.
14	You Can't Scare Me!	28 July 1997	60	0-590-30663-4
Eddie and his friends set out to scare show-off Courtney – but the town's legendary mud monsters (mud-covered zombies of the town's drowned settlers) have plans of their own to make Eddie and his friends scream.
15	Monster Blood	25 August 1997	60	0-590-30547-6
Evan and Andy find themselves in a sticky situation when they find a can of "Monster Blood" in an empty room of Evan's aunt's house – and the slime begins to grow to frightening proportions.
16	Attack of the Jack-o'-Lanterns	20 October 1997	58	0-590-37511-3
Drew Brockman notices that an evil transformation seems to have come over her friends Shane and Shana after they dress up like monsters with pumpkin heads for Halloween.
17	Calling All Creeps!	1 December 1997	64	0-590-39058-9
Nerdy Ricky Beamer's plan to get back at the girl who kicked him off the school newspaper turns into a plot to enslave humanity when a group of reptilian aliens begin calling Ricky after hours.
18	Revenge of the Lawn Gnomes	16 February 1998	64	0-590-46441-8
Pink flamingos, plastic deer--Joe Burton's dad loves lawn ornaments and does not want to lose to his militant neighbor in the annual lawn contest. But when he brings home two little front yard gnomes with red stocking caps and shiny eyes, the terror begins.

== Reboot ==
On 28 April 2020, it was announced that a rebooted live action TV series was in the works by Scholastic Entertainment, Sony Pictures Television Studios and Neal H. Moritz's production company Original Film, who produced both the 2015 film and its sequel. In March 2021, R.L. Stine stated that the series had found a producer and a director. In February 2022, it was announced that the series would be heading to Disney+. It was also revealed that the series would not follow the anthology format of the first Goosebumps series, but will instead be a 10-episode series with a storyline inspired by the films that follows a group of five high schoolers who unleash supernatural forces upon their town and must all work together –thanks to and in spite of their friendships, rivalries, and pasts with each other– in order to save it, learning much about their own parents' teenage secrets in the process.

== See also ==
- Just Beyond
- The Nightmare Room
- The Haunting Hour: The Series
