= Plant food (disambiguation) =

Plant food means fertilizer. Plant food may also refer to:

- Bath salts (drug), which may be mislabeled as "plant food".
- Plant-based diet
- Plant-based foods in general.
- Give Yourself Goosebumps: You're Plant Food!

== See also ==
- Plant & Food Research, an organization based in New Zealand.
