= Goosebumps (video game series) =

Video game series

Goosebumps video games are a series of action-adventure games based on the Goosebumps book series by R. L. Stine.

== Goosebumps: Escape from Horrorland (1996) ==
Escape from Horrorland was released in 1996 on the PC. The game acts as a sequel to the Goosebumps book, One Day at HorrorLand. This game features well-known actors including Adam Wylie, Eric Lloyd, Isabella Rossellini and Jeff Goldblum. It was directed by Lawrence Guterman, who went on to direct Cats & Dogs (2001) and Son of the Mask (2005).

== Goosebumps: Attack of the Mutant (1997) ==
Attack of the Mutant is a children's PC game based on the Goosebumps book Attack of the Mutant by R.L. Stine. It was developed and produced by DreamWorks Interactive and was released on September 25, 1997. It was one of the first games to use cel-shaded animation.

The hero gets off a bus at the wrong stop, and finds himself at the headquarters of the Masked Mutant. Within, he must work with comic book superheroes called the League of Good Guys to prevent the Masked Mutant and his evil henchmen from transforming the world into a giant comic book.

The cast of characters includes all of the comic book superheroes and supervillains featured in the original book – the Galloping Gazelle, the Masked Mutant, and the Magnificent Molecule Man – but also many original characters such as League of Good Guys members Dinah Mite, Flo, Babblin' Brook, and Feedback, the mobster villain Pinky Flamingo, plant villain Root Rot, Masked Mutant's second-in-command Chinchilla, Wartlock, and Crunch. The hero, a non-gender specific (though in-game art suggests a male) child, is a silent protagonist. The Galloping Gazelle was voiced by Adam West (who played the same role in the TV episode adaption of Attack of the Mutant) while the Masked Mutant was voiced by James Belushi.

== Goosebumps: HorrorLand (2008) ==
Scholastic Book Company released a Goosebumps HorrorLand video game on October 28, 2008, in North America, and October 16, 2009, in Europe, to tie into the series, on the Nintendo DS, Wii, and PlayStation 2 platforms. Developed by Gusto Games in Derby, the plot follows a young child and his/her friends trapped in HorrorLand, where they must make their way through challenging levels to escape the evil theme park. Reports indicate the game is similar to the original Goosebumps HorrorLand game Goosebumps Escape From Horrorland, in which players had to beat the minigames of various levels to reveal who was behind events in the park and get back home. The official website reveals that HorrorLand in the game would have five main areas: Vampire Village (which serves as a hub connecting all the others), Mad Labs, Terror Tombs (an Egyptian-themed area), Fever Swamp, and the Carnival of Screams. Several of these areas are references to classic Goosebumps books or previous depictions of HorrorLand.

The game starts off with a Horror leaving a ticket on the player's doorstep. The player tears it up but the ticket mysteriously gets put back together. Afterwards, Nate comes by and both Nate and the player set out to HorrorLand. At the beginning the player gets into the Carnival of Screams. A Horror gives the player 20 tokens for rides to start off. The player must reach the fright level to get into Vampire Village, one of the five attractions of HorrorLand. The player must get a high enough fright level to get on the Roller Ghoster and save a young girl named Gigi, who is trapped on it. After the player saves her, she joins the player to get the ticket pieces back and leave HorrorLand. Later, when the player gets to Fever Swamp, the player discovers that a show with the Great Gargantua is closed due to the monster escaping. When getting to Mad Labs, the player must collect 100 tokens to get a mask (a reference to The Haunted Mask) and once completed it mutates the player into a Horror. This allows them to go into the Horrors Only lounge to get a piece of the ticket. While in the lounge the player gets caught by Horrifico, the king of HorrorLand. While in Mad Labs, the sound of a woman saying "If you see a girl in a blue dress holding a monster doll, do not attempt to approach her. She is extremely dangerous." will play. This is a description of Gigi. The secret of HorrorLand is finally being revealed and the player must get 50 points for the fright restriction in order to get into Terror Tombs. Getting gold on the Pharaoh's Fairway would earn the last piece of the ticket. At the end of the game the Horrors grab the player. the player gets put on the final ride called Certain Death where the player must battle through to rescue Gigi and escape. Upon exiting, the player discovers that Gigi is the Great Gargantua, as she shapeshifts into the creature, and announces her plan to turn the entire world into her own HorrorLand. As she flies away, the screen fades out to "The End".

== Goosebumps: The Game (2015) ==
Goosebumps: The Game is a point and click adventure game released in 2015 for PC, PlayStation 4, PlayStation 3, Xbox One, Xbox 360, Nintendo 3DS and Nintendo Switch. In the game, the players control either a boy or a girl who they name, and they go on a spooky adventure battling the Goosebumps monsters that escape from their books.

The game is a prequel to the Goosebumps film and is developed by WayForward Technologies.

== Goosebumps: Night of Scares (2015) ==
Released in 2015, Night of Scares is a mobile game where players control a young boy named "Twist" who moved to a house that was haunted by creepy characters from the Goosebumps Series. Taking place after the film, R.L. Stine is trapped inside a typewriter thanks to Slappy. They are wished luck trying to get the pages from Night Of The Living Dummy.

== Goosebumps: Horror Town (2018) ==
Goosebumps: Horror Town (sometimes spelled HorrorTown) was a mobile game. Released on May 30, 2018 for mobile, Horror Town follows Slappy and various monsters as players build their own Goosebumps-inspired town using different locations from the different Goosebumps books. The game has received multiple monthly events based on many books and has introduced its own interpretations for said stories. It was delisted from app stores on June 29, 2026 with the game shut down by June 30, 2026.

== Goosebumps: Dead of Night (2020) ==
A port of Night of Scares, titled Goosebumps: Dead of Night, was released in summer 2020 on PlayStation 4, Nintendo Switch, Xbox One, and PC. Goosebumps: Dead of Night includes additional content not seen in Night of Scares. The Nintendo Switch version has gyroscopic controls, HD Rumble functionality, and touchscreen support.

== Goosebumps: Terror in Little Creek (2025) ==
The latest video game was released in August 2025 for PC, Xbox Series X/S, PlayStation 5 and Nintendo Switch.
