= Welcome to Dead House =

1992 book by R.L. Stine

- First edition cover
- Author: R. L. Stine
- Cover artist: Tim Jacobus; Brandon Dorman
- Language: English
- Series: Goosebumps
- Genre: Horror fiction Children's literature
- Published: July 1992 Scholastic
- Publication place: United States
- Media type: Print
- Pages: 128
- ISBN: 0590453653
- Followed by: Stay Out of the Basement

Welcome to Dead House is the first book in the original Goosebumps book series, written by R. L. Stine. It was first published in July 1992 along with Stay Out of the Basement and Monster Blood, the second and third books. Additionally, it was re-released in 2010 as the thirteenth book under the Classic Goosebumps title, featuring new artwork by Brandon Dorman.

The plot follows Amanda and Josh Benson, who move with their parents into a creepy old house located in the strange town of Dark Falls where people are unlike any they have known before.

The original cover illustration by Tim Jacobus features an old house at night, with the front door slightly ajar, and a strange figure illuminated in the window. Subsequent editions differed from one release to the next; while an early 2000s re-release of the title featured a more digitally-rendered version of Jacobus's haunted house image, the British special edition was light gray-blue in colour and featured an image of human skulls in a cemetery, an attempt to market the edition to more mature demographics who saw the Goosebumps series as wholly for children. A novelization of the 1990s Canadian TV adaptation had also been scheduled under Scholastic's Goosebumps Presents TV novelization spin-off series, but the series completed its final aired season before the publication contract could be fulfilled.

== Plot ==
The Benson family takes their first trip to Dark Falls to meet with the local real estate agent Compton Dawes, and see their new home. Mr. Benson inherited a house that belonged to his late great-uncle that he did not even know existed. Amanda Benson, her little brother Josh, and their dog Petey immediately sense that something is not quite right. Despite the fact that it is the middle of July, the entire neighborhood seems covered in an artificial darkness created by the shadows of massive, overhanging tree limbs. Dead brown leaves, shade, and shadows are everywhere. Then there is the creepy old house, that appears to have been built many years ago. It is an enormous, dark, antique home with two large bay windows on the second floor that look eerily like a pair of dark eyes staring down at the street below. While Josh proceeds to impatiently whine in protest over the family move and how tragic it is for him, Mr. Dawes welcomes the family into the home. Whilst exploring her new room, Amanda watches with amazement as she catches a glimpse of a boy standing in the doorway, before quickly disappearing down the hall.

Amanda feels much better after seeing her bedroom. She goes outside to tell Josh about it, but both he and Petey are gone. Mr. Dawes offers to provide directions while the family drive around town to find the missing pair. On the way Amanda finds it odd that there are not any people in the houses or yards, or even on the street. Eventually, the group find Josh trying to catch Petey amongst the gravestones of the Dark Falls cemetery. The kids' father Jack ends up catching Petey and putting him on a leash despite how frantic his behavior is. The family then drops off Mr. Dawes at his real estate office in Dark Falls, where he mentions to the Bensons that they can come back the following week to finalize the contracts for the house. After an eventful first visit, the Benson family leave Dark Falls and head back home to their old neighborhood.

Amanda's best friend, Kathy, comes over on the family's last night in their old house, reassuring Amanda that Dark Falls is only four hours away. The following morning is moving day, and it's a rainy, windy arrival in Dark Falls for the family at their new house. Amanda keeps seeing other children in her home and hearing strange sounds. Amanda and Josh start meeting the locals, such as Ray Thurston who seem friendly enough, but also seem a bit strange and off-putting. Both Ray and a girl named Karen claim they used to live in their house.

Two weeks later, Petey goes missing and they cannot seem to find him. That night, Josh comes into Amanda's room and theorizes that Petey went into the cemetery, just like last time. When they head out to check, they bump into Ray, who warns them about being out so late. In the cemetery, they find gravestones with their new friends names on them, including Ray's. Ray confirms that it is his, and he is actually one of the living dead.

Once a year, they must have the blood from a freshly killed person to sustain their "living dead" existence for another year. They killed Petey because dogs always sense the living dead. Ray attacks Amanda but Josh saves her at the last moment, when he shines his light on Ray's face. This results in Ray disintegrating and becoming a pile of bones. Amanda and Josh run home but when they arrive, they are attacked by the dead children who explain that there is no dead great-uncle and that the letter sent to their parents was a trick to bring the Benson family to Dark Falls. Suddenly Mr. Dawes, the real estate agent, appears at the door and the dead children vanish.

He tells them that he has already found their parents and that he will take the kids to join their parents. Although Amanda and Josh think he's saving them at first, a gravestone reveals Mr. Dawes is also dead. He explains to the children that Dark Falls used to be a normal town years ago, but a yellow gas escaped from a nearby factory and spread throughout the town, transforming the citizens into the undead. Amanda and Josh manage to escape Mr. Dawes after Josh hits him on the head with his flashlight. It turns out the dead children are mutated ghouls that crumble under light, and they knock down a tree to kill all of the living dead. They rescue their parents and go home to quickly pack up.

As the Benson family is leaving Dead House, they see a new family on the driveway. Amanda notices that these people are being guided by someone that looks like Mr. Dawes. She brushes this off and tells one of the kids that she used to live in their house, and the Benson family drives away.

== Reception ==
Welcome to Dead House had sold over a million copies by 1996. It demonstrated many themes common to horror books for children this age, including having their experiences discounted by adults. The title was known as being grittier and less goofy than most other books in the Goosebumps series, which led to it being frequently challenged by parents, religious groups and school boards since its publication. Unlike the other books in the series, Welcome to Dead House featured major supporting characters being killed, a deceased domestic pet, a plastics factory accident, and mentions of blood and gore.

Welcome to Dead House was also a book owned by Oskar in the Swedish horror novel Let the Right One In, as part of a series of Goosebumps books he had purchased from the home of a seller who was unaware of how much money the translated editions of Goosebumps books were worth. Stray Dogs, a horror comic book series by My Little Pony: Friendship Is Magic artist Tony Fleecs, featured a limited edition front cover design in a homage of Jacobus's cover art, with the title written as "Welcome to Dog House". The comic was designed to look like a Goosebumps book, and featured the same original pink-and-purple colour motif as the original print of Welcome to Dead House had.

== Adaptations ==
In the 1990s, George A. Romero had written a full screenplay for a movie length adaptation of Welcome To Dead House with a focus on the plastics factory accident and themes of capitalism and greed. In Romero's screenplay, the dead people of Dark Falls are not ghouls, but instead zombies. Moreover, they are sympathetic characters who want to be set free and able to rest in peace, while being forced by an overarching town leader named Foster DeVries to lure in new victims to keep the town sustained. Foster DeVries was an original creation of Romero's, and not a character from the original book; responsible for the plastics factory accident that killed the townspeople, DeVries becomes the primary antagonist, while Stine's original antagonists become fellow victims, like the Benson Family, who are able to die in peace after being saved by Amanda and Josh. This would have been one of the earliest examples of Romero's sympathetic, sentient zombie, after sentient zombie "Bub" from Day of the Dead. For a variety of reasons, Romero's screenplay was scrapped although after his death, the screenplay was revealed to be stored (albeit unavailable to the general public) by the University of Pittsburgh.

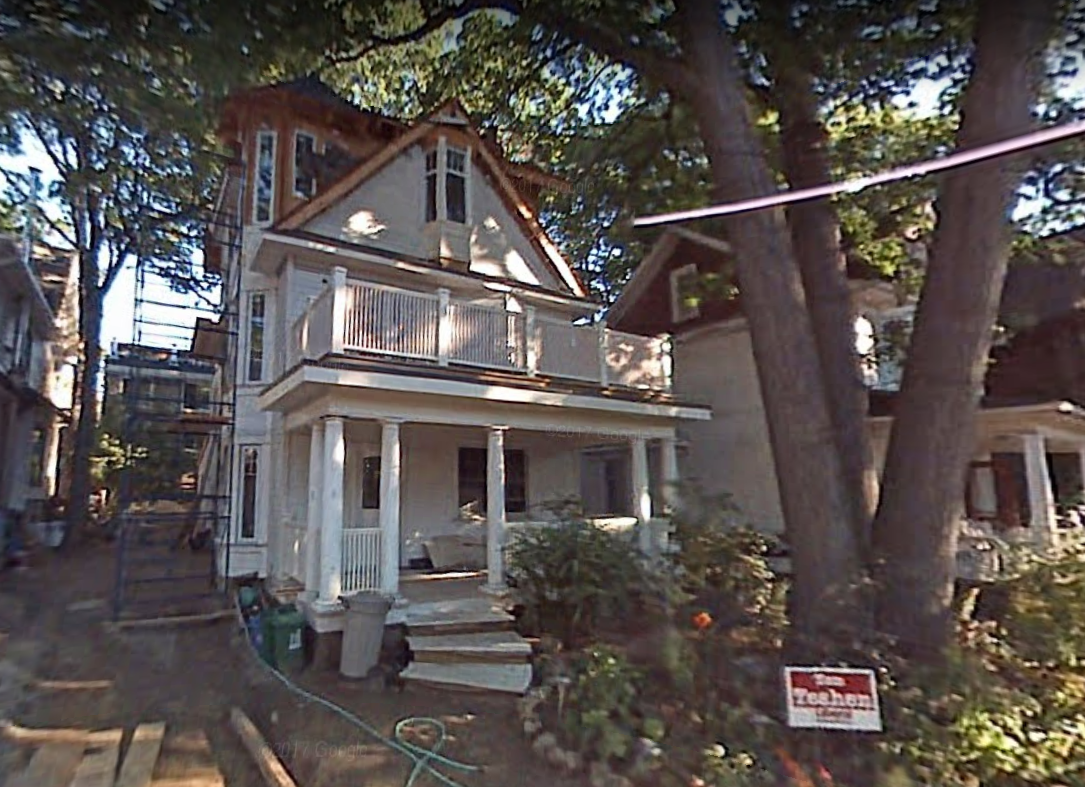
The house that served as the set for the 1997 television adaptation of Welcome to Dead House, having since undergone extensive renovations in 2007.

Welcome to Dead House became one of a select number of adapted two-part episodes in Season 2 of Goosebumps, a Canadian TV series produced by Scholastic and Fox Kids in the 1990s. Some significant changes were made in the adaptation, including the factory accident playing a more prominent role, the Dark Falls townspeople being mutated people who survive on human blood, the family dog being a collie breed rather than a white terrier, the character Karen and her family being more prominent characters, and the introduction of an aesthetically ugly antique wreath that protects the family from Dark Falls. The two-part episode, often marketed as a made-for-TV film, was released on VHS and DVD.

The video game Goosebumps HorrorTown features the addition of a Welcome to Dead House level with character Compton Dawes introduced (instead of being sympathetic as in the book, he is portrayed as greedy in the game). Dawes is responsible for establishing the Dark Falls factory in the game, as well as a mansion, which he resides in. The game is available through Google Play.

== Planned follow-up ==
R.L. Stine had planned to release a follow-up to Welcome to Dead House called "Happy Holidays From Dead House", under the brand label "Goosebumps Gold", with publicly released cover art by Tim Jacobus featuring a Christmas wreath with glowing eyes embedded inside. The book was never released.

== Merchandise ==
Welcome to Dead House is notable for inspiring a variety of merchandise items, including a glow-in-the-dark window cling (which came with the TV adaptation's VHS release), trading cards with images from the book, and a board game called "Race to Dead House", produced by Mastermind Toys in 2020.

In 1997, Taco Bell released a 3D puzzle toy coinciding with the original air date of the TV adaptation. The toy, called "The House in Dark Falls", continues to appear on internet auction sites and thrift shops.

== See also ==
- Goosebumps (original series)
- Goosebumps (video game series)
