= List of Goosebumps books =

Children's horror fiction novellas

Goosebumps is a series of children's horror fiction novellas by R. L. Stine. 62 books were published under the Goosebumps umbrella title from 1992 to 1997; the first was Welcome to Dead House; the last was Monster Blood IV. The cover illustrations for this series were done primarily by Tim Jacobus.

Some of the books were reprinted in 2003–2007 with slightly altered covers. A reprint series unofficially referred to as "Classic Goosebumps" reprinted 22 Goosebumps books from 2008 to 2011 with new artwork and bonus features such as interviews with the author; ten more books were given a similar treatment in 2015 and four more in 2018 for a total of 36 books in the "Classic" reprint series. Of these, 32 are from the original series, three (Attack of the Graveyard Ghouls, The Haunted Car, and Bride of the Living Dummy) are from Goosebumps 2000, and one (Please Don't Feed the Vampire) is from Give Yourself Goosebumps. 10 books were also made into comic books under the title Goosebumps Graphix. These were released in 4 groups: Creepy Creatures, Terror Trips and Scary Summer. The last book was 4 Goosebumps books in one called Slappy's Tales of Horror.

There were also two hardcover reprint collections: Goosebumps Collection and Monster Edition. Nine books were released under the Goosebumps Collection title and were split into three groups: Living Dummy Collection, Campfire Collection, and Monster Blood Collection. Another 12 books were released under the Monster Edition title and were split into four groups, the first three of which were simply numbered while the fourth was called Fright Light Edition. 57 of the books were reprinted with original artwork, all except for #24, #47, #60, #61, and #62. Most of the books were also adapted for television, with these exceptions: #5, #7, #17, #18, #19, #29, #33, #38, #42, #43, #45, #47, #51, #52, #53, #56, #59, #61, and #62.

Collector's tins containing 5 books each have been released every few years since 2015. These reprints feature the original cover art, but lack the embossed titles of the original printings. They also lack the numbers on the spines indicating each book's position within the series. The "Retro Scream Collection" (October 27, 2015) includes Welcome to Dead House, Say Cheese And Die!, Night of the Living Dummy, The Haunted Mask, and One Day at HorrorLand. The "25th Anniversary Retro Set" (September 26, 2017) includes Monster Blood, Why I'm Afraid of Bees, A Night in Terror Tower, The Beast From the East, and Legend of the Lost Legend. The "Retro Fear Set" (September 1, 2020) includes Stay Out of the Basement, Piano Lessons Can Be Murder, Werewolf of Fever Swamp, Cuckoo Clock of Doom, and The Haunted School.

== List of books ==
#	Title	Original published date	Reprint collection	Pages	ISBN
01	Welcome to Dead House	July 1992	Classic Goosebumps #13; Monster Edition #1 “Retro Scream" Tin	123	0-590-45365-3
02	Stay Out of the Basement	July 1992	Monster Edition #1; Classic Goosebumps #22 “Retro Fear" Tin	122	0-590-45366-1
03	Monster Blood	September 1992	Classic Goosebumps #3; Monster Blood Collection; 25th Anniversary Tin	128	0-590-45367-X
04	Say Cheese and Die!	November 1992	Classic Goosebumps #8; Monster Edition #1 "Retro Scream" Tin	132	0-590-45368-8
05	The Curse of the Mummy's Tomb	January 1993	Classic Goosebumps #6	132	0-590-45369-6
06	Let's Get Invisible	March 1993	Classic Goosebumps #24	139	0-590-45370-X
07	Night of the Living Dummy	May 1993	Classic Goosebumps #1; Living Dummy Collection; Monster Edition #2 "Retro Scream" Tin	134	0-590-46617-8
08	The Girl Who Cried Monster	May 1993	Classic Goosebumps #39	137	0-590-46618-6
09	Welcome to Camp Nightmare	July 1993	Classic Goosebumps #14; Campfire Collection; Fright Light Edition	136	0-590-46619-4
10	The Ghost Next Door	August 1993	Classic Goosebumps #29; Monster Edition #3	124	0-590-49445-7
11	The Haunted Mask	September 1993	Classic Goosebumps #4 "Retro Scream" Tin	121	0-590-49446-5
12	Be Careful What You Wish For...	October 1993	Classic Goosebumps #7	121	0-590-49447-3
13	Piano Lessons Can Be Murder	November 1993	Retro Scream Tin	124	0-590-49448-1
14	The Werewolf of Fever Swamp	December 1993	Classic Goosebumps #11; Creepy Creatures "Retro Fear" Tin	123	0-590-49449-X
15	You Can't Scare Me!	January 1994	Classic Goosebumps #17	120	0-590-49450-3
16	One Day at HorrorLand	February 1994	Classic Goosebumps #5; Terror Trips "Retro Scream" Tin	123	0-590-47738-2
17	Why I'm Afraid of Bees	March 1994	25th Anniversary tin	117	0-590-47739-0
18	Monster Blood II	April 1994	Monster Blood Collection	121	0-590-47740-4
19	Deep Trouble	May 1994	Classic Goosebumps #2; Terror Trips	117	0-590-47741-2
20	The Scarecrow Walks at Midnight	June 1994	Classic Goosebumps #16; Creepy Creatures	122	0-590-47742-0
21	Go Eat Worms!	July 1994	Classic Goosebumps #38	119	0-590-47743-9
22	Ghost Beach	August 1994	Classic Goosebumps #15; Scary Summer; Monster Edition #3	119	0-590-47744-7
23	Return of the Mummy	September 1994	Classic Goosebumps #18	118	0-590-47745-5
24	Phantom of the Auditorium	October 1994	Classic Goosebumps #20	126	0-590-48354-4
25	Attack of the Mutant	November 1994	None	119	0-590-48355-2
26	My Hairiest Adventure	December 1994	None	122	0-590-48350-1
27	A Night in Terror Tower	January 1995	Classic Goosebumps #12; 25th Anniversary Tin	129	0-590-48351-X
28	The Cuckoo Clock of Doom	February 1995	Classic Goosebumps #37	118	0-590-48352-8
29	Monster Blood III	March 1995	Monster Blood Collection	126	0-590-48347-1
30	It Came from Beneath the Sink!	April 1995	Retro Scream Tin	112	0-590-48348-X
31	Night of the Living Dummy II	May 1995	Classic Goosebumps #25; Living Dummy Collection; Monster Edition #2	120	0-590-48349-8
32	The Barking Ghost	June 1995	Monster Edition #3	118	0-590-48344-7
33	The Horror at Camp Jellyjam	July 1995	Classic Goosebumps #9; Scary Summer; Fright Light Edition	128	0-590-48345-5
34	Revenge of the Lawn Gnomes	August 1995	Classic Goosebumps #19; Scary Summer	119	0-590-48346-3
35	A Shocker on Shock Street	September 1995	Classic Goosebumps #23; Terror Trips	117	0-590-48340-4
36	The Haunted Mask II	October 1995	Classic Goosebumps #34	124	0-590-56873-6
37	The Headless Ghost	November 1995	Classic Goosebumps #33	113	0-590-56874-4
38	The Abominable Snowman of Pasadena	December 1995	Classic Goosebumps #27; Creepy Creatures	127	0-590-56875-2
39	How I Got My Shrunken Head	January 1996	Classic Goosebumps #10	119	0-590-56876-0
40	Night of the Living Dummy III	February 1996	Classic Goosebumps #26; Living Dummy Collection; Monster Edition #2	125	0-590-56877-9
41	Bad Hare Day	March 1996	None	117	0-590-56878-7
42	Egg Monsters from Mars	April 1996	Classic Goosebumps #40	115	0-590-56879-5
43	The Beast from the East	May 1996	25th Anniversary Tin	118	0-590-56880-9
44	Say Cheese and Die—Again!	June 1996	None	115	0-590-56881-7
45	Ghost Camp	July 1996	Campfire Collection; Fright Light Edition	118	0-590-56882-5
46	How to Kill a Monster	August 1996	None	112	0-590-56883-3
47	Legend of the Lost Legend	September 1996	25th Anniversary tin	122	0-590-56884-1
48	Attack of the Jack-O'-Lanterns	October 1996	Classic Goosebumps #36	113	0-590-56885-X
49	Vampire Breath	November 1996	Classic Goosebumps #21	114	0-590-56886-8
50	Calling All Creeps!	December 1996	None	116	0-590-56887-6
51	Beware, the Snowman	January 1997	None	113	0-590-56888-4
52	How I Learned to Fly	February 1997	None	123	0-590-56889-2
53	Chicken Chicken	March 1997	None	112	0-590-56890-6
54	Don't Go to Sleep!	April 1997	None	118	0-590-56891-4
55	The Blob That Ate Everyone	May 1997	Classic Goosebumps #28	114	0-590-56892-2
56	The Curse of Camp Cold Lake	June 1997	Campfire Collection	114	0-590-56893-0
57	My Best Friend Is Invisible	July 1997	None	119	0-590-56894-9
58	Deep Trouble II	August 1997	None	113	0-590-56895-7
59	The Haunted School	September 1997	None	170	0-590-56897-3
60	Werewolf Skin	October 1997	None	125	0-590-39053-8
61	I Live in Your Basement!	November 1997	None	111	0-590-39986-1
62	Monster Blood IV	December 1997	None	118	0-590-39987-X
