= A Night in Terror Tower =

Novel by R. L. Stine

- First edition cover
- Author: R. L. Stine
- Cover artist: Tim Jacobus
- Language: English
- Series: Goosebumps
- Genre: Horror fiction, Children's literature
- Publisher: Scholastic
- Publication date: January 1995
- Publication place: United States
- Media type: Print (Paperback)
- Pages: 129 (first edition, paperback).
- ISBN: 0-590-48351-X
- Preceded by: My Hairiest Adventure
- Followed by: The Cuckoo Clock of Doom

A Night in Terror Tower is the twenty-seventh book in the original Goosebumps, the series of children's horror fiction novels created and authored by R. L. Stine. It was adapted into a two-part episode, an audiobook, and a board game. The plot is loosely based on the historical Princes in the Tower.

== Plot ==
Sue and her younger brother Eddie are American tourists in London. After Eddie wants to visit the Tower of London, they join a tour of the castle. As the tour progresses, Sue notices that a man wearing all black with a black hood over his face is following them as they move throughout the castle. The man in black, who also wears a cape, chases them and the children manage to escape. After going back to their hotel room, they find out that the suite is empty and that their parents are not in the hotel, and the children have trouble remembering their last name. After they leave the hotel's restaurant, the man in black blocks their path, and sends them to Medieval times with magical stones.

Confused, alone, and frightened, Eddie and Sue are once again stalked by the man in black. After Eddie disappears, Sue eventually finds refuge in the home of a peasant woman who promises to keep her safe. However, this turns out to be a ruse, as the woman quickly betrays her and turns her over to the man in black, who is revealed to be the Lord High Executioner of the king of England. Sue is then taken back to Tower to await execution, wherein she meets Eddie, who admits to having been captured earlier.

In the dungeon, the children meet Morgred, a white-haired sorcerer, who informs them that they are Edward and Susannah, Prince and Princess of York, heir to the throne, and niece and nephew to the current King. It is revealed that the King murdered their parents—the rightful King and Queen—to claim the throne for himself, and was attempting to murder the children in order to forestall any challenge to his rule. However, before he could succeed, Morgred sent the children into a distant future with new memories in hopes of saving them from their uncle. However, he was unable to complete their new memories, resulting in them forgetting their parents and their own surnames.

Fully aware of their identity, Sue and Eddie prepare for their execution. After being asked by the children, Morgred refuses to send them back to the future, fearing for his own life, even after Eddie hands him the three magical stones, which he had stolen from the Lord High Executioner upon his capture. Eddie, utilizing his pickpocketing skills, lifts the three stones from Morgred's robe and performs the spell himself, returning himself and Sue to the future, wherein they're met by a new tour group, with Morgred as one of the tourists, having been brought along to serve as the children's guardian. As they prepare to leave the Tower along with the group, Morgred tells the children to call him Mr. Morgan, and the children adopt Morgan as their surname.

== Adaptations ==
The book was adapted into a two-part episode for the television series. Jeffrey Kauffman, of DVD Talk, wrote, "If you're new to the Goosebumps world, this is a great place to start, with two exceptional episodes which perfectly balance thrills with an at times black humor".

An audiobook was released by Walt Disney Records, which was nominated for an Audie Award for "Best Audio Children's Production". In a review of the audiobook, Billboard said that it is an "imaginative, intriguing tale of two American tourists who visit Terror Tower".

It was adapted into a board game titled Goosebumps: A Night in Terror Tower Game, released by the Milton Bradley Company.

Artist Tim Jacobus stated in his autobiography It Came From New Jersey! My Life As An Artist that the cover was one of the hardest pieces of art he ever had to draw and the longest to finish.

A spin-off and sequel appears in the Give Yourself Goosebumps book Return To Terror Tower where the protagonists from the first book return to take down their evil uncle Robert once and for all.

== Sales ==
A 2001 article from Publishers Weekly said that the book was 294 on the list of bestselling children's books of all time, with 1,316,723 copies sold since its original publication.

== Home media ==
The VHS release included a bookmark. The episodes were released on DVD in 2008, with no special features. The DVD also includes the two-part episode Stay Out of the Basement.

== See also ==
- Tower of London in popular culture
