= The Haunted Mask =

Part of the 'Goosebumps' series by R.L. Stine

- First edition cover
- Author: R. L. Stine
- Cover artist: Tim Jacobus
- Language: English
- Series: Goosebumps
- Genre: Horror fiction, children's literature
- Published: September 1993 Scholastic
- Publication place: United States
- Media type: Print (paperback)
- Pages: 121 (first edition)
- ISBN: 0-590-49446-5
- OCLC: 28659535
- LC Class: MLC R CP01287
- Preceded by: The Ghost Next Door
- Followed by: Be Careful What You Wish For...

The Haunted Mask is the eleventh book in the original Goosebumps, the series of children's horror fiction novels created and written by R. L. Stine. The book follows Carly Beth, a girl who buys a rubber mask from a store. After putting on the mask for Halloween, she starts acting differently and discovers that the mask has become her face, being unable to take it off. R. L. Stine says he got the idea for the book from his son who had put on a Frankenstein mask he had trouble getting off.

The Haunted Mask was featured on the USA Today and Publishers Weekly bestseller list, and cited by one reviewer as "ideal for reluctant readers and Halloween-themed sleepovers." In the mid-1990s, the book was adapted for television and released on VHS on March 12, 1996. The Haunted Mask has three published sequels: The Haunted Mask II, The Scream of the Haunted Mask and a stand-alone story, Wanted: The Haunted Mask.

== Background ==
The Haunted Mask was written by R. L. Stine and originally illustrated by Tim Jacobus. The former says the idea for the book came from his son, Matthew, who put on a Frankenstein mask that he had trouble getting off during Halloween. Stine also says that he incorporated a duck costume his parents got him for trick-or-treating in the book. Tim Jacobus's niece was the model for the cover of the book.

The book was first published in September 1993 by Scholastic, and reissued in 2003 and on September 1, 2008. An audiobook, narrated by Jorjeana Marie, was published in 2015 by Scholastic Audio.

== Plot ==
Carly Beth Caldwell is a naive, timid and gullible eleven-year-old girl who scares easily. Thus, she is constantly ridiculed by Steve Boswell and Chuck Greene at Walnut Avenue Middle School. The duo play several tricks on her, such as offering a sandwich containing a live worm. After school, she goes home and finds her mother has made her a plaster of Carly Beth's face as a symbol of love. When she goes to her room, her younger brother Noah scares her in a duck costume also made by their mother. At the school science fair, Steve causes a panic by announcing his pet tarantula has escaped and exploits Carly Beth's arachnophobia by pinching her leg, leading her to believe that the tarantula has bitten her. She flies into a frenzied and destructive panic and is once again humiliated in front of her teachers and classmates. Carly Beth exasperatedly vents to her friend Sabrina and promises vengeance upon Steve and Chuck. She plots to go to a new shop that has opened, which sells frightening costumes, and plans to scare Steve and Chuck as payback.

Within the shop, Carly Beth sneaks into a back room and discovers a row of hideously deformed masks. One mask grabs her attention: a green mask with a bulging, bald head, a broad, flat nose, glowing orange eyes, pointed ears, dark lips, and sharp fangs. The store owner reluctantly sells her the mask and Carly Beth goes home in delight. After successfully scaring Noah with the mask, she dons it again on Halloween evening and manages to scare Chuck and Steve. However, as the night goes on, her voice deepens and her behavior becomes violent; she strangles Sabrina and frightens children she does not know. Carly Beth later discovers that she is unable to remove the mask and realizes to her horror that the mask has become one with her skin.

Carly Beth returns to the shop, where the shopkeeper tells her that the "masks" in the back room are actually living faces that can only be removed by a "symbol of love", but if it attaches itself to her or another person again, the fusion will be permanent. The other masks suddenly come to life and begin to pursue Carly Beth. While running away from the masks, she realizes that the plaster mold her mother made is a symbol of love. Carly Beth finds the mold and uses it to deter the masks and remove the mask from her face. She returns home to her mother, tossing the mask away. Noah later bursts in and asks her, "How do I look in your mask?"

== Reception ==
The Haunted Mask was featured on USA Today's Top 150 Best-Selling Books database for 43 weeks, attaining a peak position of 107. In 2001, it was listed as the 249th bestselling children's paperback book of all time by Publishers Weekly, having sold 1.42 million copies.

Terreece Clarke from Common Sense Media rated the book three stars out of five, commenting that it "is ideal for reluctant readers and Halloween-themed sleepovers" and "is one of the better books in the Goosebumps series". Flavorwire's Kevin Pires listed the book as one of his ten favorite Goosebumps books, stating "Tim Jacobus' [...] gripping illustration and Stine's straightforward plot made The Haunted Mask an emblem for the series." Nathan Reese and Brooke Marine from Complex.com ranked it as the best Goosebumps book, stating the book was very thrilling, and the twist ending caused the right amount of horror. Writer and librarian Herbert N. Foerstel stated it was "perhaps the most famous Goosebumps book".

== Television adaptation and VHS release ==
Filming for "The Haunted Mask" episode began in 1995 in Toronto, Ontario, Canada. The episode first aired on October 27, 1995, on the Fox Network as the series premiere of the Goosebumps TV series. In the United States, "The Haunted Mask" was viewed by approximately 7.9 million households. In Canada, the episode aired on YTV and became the network's highest rated episode up to that point, with nearly three million viewers.

It was subsequently released on VHS on March 12, 1996. The video was listed 75th in Billboard's list of Top Video Sales for 1996, the only Goosebumps video on the list. Frazier Tharpe, Brendan Klinkenberg, and Khal from Complex.com named it the 10th best Halloween themed TV episode and called it one of the scariest Goosebumps episodes. Michelle Erica Green from FamilyWonder.com felt that it had genuinely scary and exciting scenes, but thought it had stereotypical characters, a corny feel-good message, and hokey special effects which weakened its impact. In 1997, Kathryn Long, who played Carly Beth, received a Gemini Award nomination for "Best Performance in a Children's or Youth Program or Series".

== Sequels ==
Three sequels of the book were published, The Haunted Mask II in October 1995 (the thirty-sixth book in the Goosebumps series), The Scream of the Haunted Mask on August 1, 2008 (the fourth book in the Goosebumps HorrorLand series) and a stand-alone story on July 1, 2012, Wanted: The Haunted Mask. Wanted: The Haunted Mask was published as a celebration of the 20th anniversary of Goosebumps. Another book, The Haunted Mask Lives!, was listed on illustrator Tim Jacobus's website, but was not released.

== See also ==
- Bibliography of Halloween
