= Same Old Story =

Same Old Story may refer to:

- "Same Old Story" (Ultravox song), 1986
- "Same Old Story" (The Driver Era song), 2025
- "Same Old Story", a song by Pennywise from About Time
- "Same Old Story", a song by John Legend from Darkness and Light
- "Same Old Story", a song by Skepta from Ignorance Is Bliss
- "Same Old Story", a song by Sugababes from One Touch
- "Same Old Story", a song sung by Merry Clayton in 1971, written by Carole King

== See also ==
- "Same Ol' Story", a 2008 song by Cyndi Lauper
