= Goosebumps HorrorLand =

Horror novella series by R.L. Stine

Goosebumps HorrorLand is a horror novella series by R.L. Stine, a spin-off of his popular Goosebumps books, with its title and setting taken from the previous Goosebumps books One Day at HorrorLand and Return to HorrorLand. There was an almost ten-year gap between the publication of Return to HorrorLand and the initial installment of the Goosebumps HorrorLand spin-off series.

== Overview ==
R.L. Stine had written what was originally announced as a twelve-book series titled Goosebumps HorrorLand. The series, based loosely on One Day at HorrorLand (sixteenth in the original series) and Return to HorrorLand (thirteenth in the Goosebumps 2000 series), is the first Goosebumps series where each book is part of the same plot, and the first Goosebumps fictional crossover, with characters, villains and locations from distinct Goosebumps continuities interacting.

The first twelve books were announced with the following details:

The new series will be an immersive storytelling experience welcoming fans to HorrorLand, a vast theme park which R.L. Stine describes as “the scariest place on Earth.” In a Goosebumps first, the new series will be a serialized adventure, and the story won't end on the final page of book one, Revenge of the Living Dummy. Instead, the spine-tingling and funny bone-tickling adventures will continue on the Internet and in books #1-12, each of which can also stand alone. The first nine HorrorLand books all will feature a combination of frightful new faces as well as the vilest villains from the original Goosebumps series. Ordinary kids are being summoned to HorrorLand—but why? Readers are in for the ride of their lives as the cast of characters trapped in the theme park grows larger with each book, and their situations become more and more perilous.

Books #11-12 will take place entirely in HorrorLand. Who—or what—is behind the evil plot to assemble these kids? The answer will be revealed in the final book. Soon after the debut of books #1 and #2, Scholastic also will begin to reissue original Goosebumps books—ten bestselling titles that tie in with each new story as it unfolds in HorrorLand.

Also launching in April will be a dedicated Goosebumps HorrorLand website (www.enterhorrorland.com) that, with the publication of each book, will further the narrative and provide corresponding clues to help readers unlock the secrets to HorrorLand. In addition, the web site will offer readers original HorrorLand material not available in the books—including ten free internet-only related stories, bonus downloads, interactive games, and more.

Each book in the first arc had two stories. The first (considerably longer) story introduces the villain and protagonists in a self-contained plot; the second story is combined with those of the other books to form a serialised plot. Each of these latter stories follow the book's protagonists when they get to HorrorLand and are united with the other series characters. The books also include a case file that links to material on the EscapeHorrorLand.com tie-in website. The final two books in the arc have only 1 story, following Lizzy and Luke of One Day at HorrorLand and wrapping up the 'HorrorLand' plot.

Scholastic's reprints of classic Goosebumps titles to accompany the series have all-new covers and bonus material. They are known as "collector's editions," and are marketed under the title "Classic Goosebumps." Since not all the books in Goosebumps HorrorLand are connected to classic books, some of the reissues relate to the ongoing Enter HorrorLand storyline, or are simply reissues of bestsellers. For example, Be Careful What You Wish For... is a Classic reissue because the character Clarissa was used as the basis for HorrorLand's fortune-teller dummy, Madame Doom.

Ultimately, there were some deviations from the original announcement; the tenth book did not take place exclusively in HorrorLand, and reissues of classic Goosebumps books continued on past the tenth, probably due to their sales success. Finally, shortly before the publication of the twelfth and concluding book in the series, it was revealed that a new story arc, running for seven books and bringing the total to nineteen, would begin in 2010. This was confirmed in the back of the Survival Guide, in which there was a three-chapter preview.

In May 2010, Stine revealed via a video interview that he had just agreed to write six more books for a second arc in the series, bringing the total to twenty-five, and that he hadn't yet come up with any ideas for them.

The second arc follows a similar format to the first; the prologue introduces the protagonists trying to buy an item in HorrorLand's gift shop, Chiller House, which is then gifted to them (plus a small statue) by proprietor Jonathan Chiller. Each gift is integral to the book's main plot, which is followed by an epilogue of Chiller transporting the protagonist back to HorrorLand via the statue. As with the first arc, the last book in the arc has only 1 story, focusing on the series protagonists as a group.

== Format ==
Each book in the first arc is split into three sections.

=== Section 1: The Story ===
This is the main section of the book, lasting approximately 100 pages. Since it reads identically to a classic Goosebumps book, readers will be most familiar with this section. It continues to incredibly more sections.

=== Section 2: Enter HorrorLand ===
Technically a continuation of the first section (as well as a continuation of the previous books' "Enter HorrorLand" segments), this 30-40-page mini-story is a crossover which finds the book's characters invited to HorrorLand as Very Special Guests, meeting up with other books' protagonists and villains. Each HorrorLand segment ends with a "cliffhanger" ending, to be continued in the next book's HorrorLand segment. For example, in The Scream of the Haunted Mask, at the end, Carly Beth and Sabrina think that a werewolf is tackling them. In Dr. Maniac vs. Robby Schwartz, it is revealed that it was just Robby.

=== Section 3: Fear File ===
Only a few pages long and not included in the page count, each book's Fear File contains fictional maps, brochures, menus, etc. pertaining to the section of the theme park featured in that book, along with a hand-drawn map of the area. Each book also includes a fictional advertisement to its featured park area on the front page of each book. Most of the advertisements feature web addresses for EnterHorrorLand.com and EscapeHorrorLand.com. Each map can be connected to form the whole park map.

The order of the maps (from the top-left corner to the bottom-right corner): Top row: 6, 12, 4, 11. Middle row: 10, 8, 1, 9. Bottom row: 2, 3, 5, 7. The Fear File features which appear in the books are merely samples of the full chapters, which are published in full in Welcome to HorrorLand: A Survival Guide. The first ten chapters were originally located at escapehorrorland.com.

=== Other features ===
Some books feature single-chapter previews of the books on which they were based. For example, Creep from the Deep features a single-chapter preview of the original Deep Trouble. In addition, the back of each of book in the first arc shows half of a HorrorLand map token on either edge of the book. When two corresponding books, such as #1 and #2, are placed next to each other, the two halves match up and show a complete token; in this case, it features Slappy the Dummy. Following this pattern, the second book shows half of a coin that will only be complete when placed next to the third book, and so on. Each token has a unique message, written in mirror writing, around the edge. The tokens form different messages depending on whether they are placed against the following book in the series, or their corresponding companion reissue, which also bear half-tokens; for example, placing Revenge of the Living Dummy and Creep from the Deep together gives the message "Find This Token Online," but Revenge of the Living Dummy and the reissued Night of the Living Dummy spell "Find This Dummy Online." The twelfth, final token was never completed.

=== Second Arc ===
The books in the second arc, from #13 onwards, are also split into three parts - Part One is a mini-adventure in HorrorLand, Part Two tells the main story, and the Epilogue describes the hero's return to HorrorLand.

Online bookstores have posted a listing for more then-upcoming Goosebumps HorrorLand books, beginning with "When The Ghost Dog Howls", released on January 1, 2010. They have provided the following synopsis, implying that the series has been extended to include nineteen books with a new seven-book story arc:

Each eerie adventure of the next seven-book arc begins with a trip to the Chiller House, a gift shop only found in HorrorLand. Kids are invited to take a little horror home with them and given a souvenir and a miniature Horror. At home, the kids experience wild things with their "free" gift, while the glowing, menacing Horror keeps an eye on the fun. When it's time for their payment, the Horror takes them back to shopkeeper Jonathan Chiller.
Unlucky book #13 kicks off an entirely new type of terror that will keep you guessing and quaking until book #19.

=== Third Arc ===
Announced in May 2010, the third arc, known as "Hall of Horrors", contains six books. The arc's tagline is "The Hall of Horrors is open. Step into the nightmare!". According to the teaser at the end of book 19, the Hall of Horrors is "hidden in the darkest shadows of the park. It is the place for kids who have frightening stories to tell." Hall of Horrors is numbered as a separate series, beginning again at number 1. The Hall of Horrors is run by a Horror called the Story-Keeper, who hears the stories of the protagonist when they visit the Hall of Horrors.

== Books ==
#	Title	Original published date	Pages	ISBN
N–A	Welcome to HorrorLand: A Survival Guide	October 12, 2009	137	0-545-09008-3
A promotional book filled with HorrorLand facts.
N–A	Goosebumps HorrorLand: Write Your Fright	2009	64	0-545-33295-8
Think you can out-scare the Master of Horror, R.L. Stine? Write your own endings to six of his scariest stories and keep your work safe behind the oozing hand lock, which screams in alarm when opened.
01	Revenge of the Living Dummy	April 1, 2008	128	0-439-91869-3
R. L. Stine commented in an interview that he thought Revenge of the Living Dummy, the first Goosebumps Horrorland book, was one of his scariest stories. Revenge of the Living Dummy was listed as the 39th bestselling children's paperback frontlist book for the year 2008, with over 184,000 sales. Terry Miller Shannon from KidsReads.com described this book as "a fun, fast-paced, spine-chilling thriller for kids who love to be scared". Publishers Weekly stated in a starred review that this book was "a suspenseful opener" that was "broken into two equally enjoyable sections". An excerpt from this book was published on The New York Times and NPR. Revenge of the Living Dummy was adapted into an audiobook released in August 2008, narrated by Alissa Hunnicutt. The School Library Journal stated that Hunnicutt did a "more than capable job reading these two related stories" and "Effective and nearly constant sound effects enhance the telling and increase the tension".
02	Creep from the Deep	April 1, 2008	137	0-439-91870-7
In a follow-up to Deep Trouble and Deep Trouble II, Billy and Sheena Deep always expect adventure when they visit their uncle Dr. George Deep the marine biologist and encounter another creep from the deep - the fearsome pirate captain Long Ben One Leg even though he's been dead for centuries. Later, an invitation to Horrorland leads the Deep siblings and their new friend Matthew into another terrifying situation.
03	Monster Blood For Breakfast!	June 1, 2008	137	0-439-91871-5
The athletic Matthew Daniels and his sister Livvy can't stand their neighbor Bradley "Worm" Wormser who copies Matthew in every way he can. Bradley orders a plastic egg full of Monster Blood on Matthew's computer, but a backfiring prank Matthew with Monster Blood for breakfast. Even after solving that problem, Matthew is faced with another: An invitation to Horrorland where old and new dangers may be lurking around!
04	The Scream of the Haunted Mask	August 1, 2008	139	0-439-91872-3
Menaced by the scream of The Haunted Mask, Carly Beth starts to delve into its past - searching for a way to escape it. She uncovers a terrifying tale about an old stable she works near, but the mask isn't the only threat. At Horrorland, she and her friend Sabrina team up with the other Very Special Guests and overhear a disturbing plot to dispose of them all.
05	Dr. Maniac vs. Robby Schwartz	October 1, 2008	132	0-439-91873-1
Robby Schwartz creates comic strips on his computer starring bizarre supervillains. His favorite is the crazy Dr. Maniac, but fantasy and reality collide when Dr. Maniac appears in Robby's hometown with a dastardly plot. It's Dr. Maniac vs. Robby Schwartz and even after Robby is invited to Horrorland their fight continues with more friends and enemies appearing on the scene.
06	Who's Your Mummy?	January 1, 2009	133	0-439-91874-X
Abby Martin and her little brother Peter were staying with their Egyptologist uncle Jonathan, but suspect he is keeping secrets from them in his creepy Egyptian themed mansion including a bunch of ancient mummies, but who's the real threat? Later, Abby visits Horrorland, where she meets another Very Special Guest, Michael "Monster" Munroe and the Horror named Byron. Can he really help them out?
07	My Friends Call Me Monster	January 1, 2009	138	0-439-91875-8
Michael "Monster" Munroe has had it with his teacher Mrs. Hardesty, but during an attempt to get even, he discovers a giant egg in her attic and finds out that she's not human and soon neither is he. Afterwards, Michael visits HorrorLand and meets Abby Martin, another one of the Very Special Guests. With Michael's help, the Very Special Guests learn more about HorrorLand and the mysterious Panic Park, but are they on the right track?
08	Say Cheese And Die Screaming!	March 1, 2009	160	0-439-91876-6
Julie Enhrit enters a picture taking competition, confident she can win, but when she gets a weird camera from a yard sale, weird and evil things begin to happen weird and evil things that show up in Julie's camera pictures. If that's not scary enough, a trip to Horrorland is also in Julie's future, including a nightmarish experience in the Tunnel of Screams.
09	Welcome To Camp Slither	April 15, 2009	133	0-439-91877-4
Spooky legends aside, animal-loving siblings Boone and Heather Dixon can't wait to get to Camp Hither, but an infestation of snakes soon changes their minds. Even after they can get to the bottom of the trouble, more danger awaits when Boone gets to Horrorland and is captured with the other Very Special Guests.
10	Help! We Have Strange Powers!	April 15, 2009	133	0-439-91878-2
Twin siblings Jillian and Jack Gerard need help. They've developed some really strange abilities after an encounter with the fortune teller machine named Madame Doom and soon find themselves being targeted by an evil organization led by Inspector Cranium that wants to control that power and the danger doesn't stop once they get to Horrorland, where they join the rest of the Very Special Guests and meet a couple of surprising faces from the past.
11	Escape From Horrorland	June 1, 2009	132	0-439-91879-0
Luke and Lizzy Morris have returned to Horrorland, intending to save the Very Special Guests from their mysterious enemy, but even their best efforts cannot keep them from escaping to Panic Park, a strange world where the 16 must confront some old foes from their pasts like Captain Long Ben One Leg, and the Haunted Mask and finally meet the man behind everything - The Menace.
12	The Streets of Panic Park	July 1, 2009	136	0-439-91880-4
Continuing from the previous story, Luke, Lizzy and the other Very Special Guests escaped from Horrorland, but they ended up trapped in the streets of Panic Park instead at the mercy of The Menace. In order to escape the nightmare for good and foil The Menace's evil plans, the 14 Very Special Guests and the Morris siblings must face their fears. With the help of Slappy the Dummy, Captain Long Ben One Leg, Dr. Crawler, Dr. Maniac, The Haunted Mask, Tutten Rha and Inspector Cranium, will the horror finally be at an end?
13	When The Ghost Dog Howls	January 1, 2010	160	0-545-16194-0
12 year old siblings Andy and Marnie had a great week in Horrorland even though they were freaked out by Murder the Clown and a zombie mob. When the park's Chiller House store offers Andy a free souvenir, he doesn't ask any questions despite the shopkeeper saying he'd have to pay "next time you see me" or that the souvenir hound's tooth is said to be haunted. He thinks it's worth the risk to have a dog's tooth that grants wishes, but when he hears howling in the night and Marnie starts behaving oddly, she thinks again about the gift from Horrorland.
14	Little Shop of Hamsters	March 1, 2010	160	0-545-16195-9
Sam Waters is desperate for a pet, but his parents insist he must prove he's responsible. To do so he takes an after school job in the Little Shop of Hamsters, but it turns out that the hamsters have a monstrous side. Could his Horrorland souvenirs have anything to do with this?
15	Heads You Lose!	May 1, 2010	160	0-545-16196-7
Jessica Bowen and Ryan Chang arrive in Jonathan Chiller's shop upon entering the Forever Box in Mondo the Magical's magic shop. They bring along a souvenir: a 2 headed coin which transports them back in time to meet Prince Beaufort, the coin's original owner and were faced with losing their heads unless they can reunite the prince with his head!
16	Weirdo Halloween: Special Edition	July 1, 2010	192	0-545-16197-5
On October 30th, the siblings Chris and Meg Oliver rescue a young child in a costume from a hedge, only to discover the "kid" is really Bim, a smelly alien known as a Weirdo with a lot of disgusting habits who promptly swears allegiance to them. The following day, the Weirdos invade the Earth and the twins find their souvenir from Horrorland may be the only thing that can save or harm them! In the second part of the story, Meg is summoned back to Horrorland by Jonathan Chiller to participate in one of his bizarre games.
17	The Wizard of Ooze	September 1, 2010	160	0-545-16198-3
Marco and Gabriella were fans of The Ooze, a graphic novel series about a mutant made of oil sludge and Jonathan Chiller's shop happens to have a rare edition of The Wizard of Ooze with instructions on how to gain one's own super powers, but when Marco mentions the book at a comic convention, he finds himself pursued by some shady characters.
18	Slappy New Year!	November 1, 2010	160	0-545-16199-1
Ray Gordon loves scaring his wimpy brother Brandon especially with the new dummy Slappy he got from Chiller House in Horrorland. His parents command him to stop or they'll cancel his New Year's Eve party, but the dummy his own ideas too.
19	The Horror At Chiller House	January 1, 2011	160	0-545-16200-9
Jonathan Chiller told 6 of his customers that they could each take a souvenir home and that they would pay him back the next time they saw him. Now the time has come for him to come and now the 6 kids must compete in a scavenger hunt searching all of Horrorland for 6 red chests that can each send 1 kid back to their home, but Chiller has no intention of letting them escape. In the guise of Murder the Clown, Mondo the Magical, Madame Doom, and the Horrors Chef Burr P. Belcher, Winner Taikall, and Symour Winn-Doe, he will be doing his best to block them at every turn and in doing so make sure the horror never ends.
Hall of Horrors
01	Claws!	March 1, 2011	160	0-545-28933-5
The Story-Keeper hears Mickey Coe's story on how he and Amanda have been put in charge of their vacationing neighbors' cat, Bella. But when she escapes from the house and gets hit by a truck, Amanda has an idea to replace the cat with a look-alike from the local pet store Cat Heaven. When the owner refuses to sell them the cat they pick out, they decide to steal it... but unfortunately, the cats at the store are more than what they seem.
02	Night of the Giant Everything	May 1, 2011	160	0-545-28935-1
The Story-Keeper hears 11-year-old Steven Sweeney's story of the time he was tricked into drinking a strange mixture of chemicals, things begin to get strange, as he starts shrinking and must navigate his way through gigantic dust bunnies, enormous birds, and other once seemingly harmless, everyday items to get to his best friend's house for help.
03	The Five Masks of Dr. Screem: Special Edition	July 1, 2011	192	0-545-28936-X
The Story-Keeper hears a Halloween story from Monica Anderson about the time she and her little brother have just gotten involved in a terrifying adventure that pits them against the evil Dr. Screem who wants to obtain five sacred masks with the power to manipulate the world around them.
04	Why I Quit Zombie School	October 1, 2011	160	0-545-28932-7
The Story-Keeper hears Matt Krinsky's story about the time when he was enrolled in a new school where he excels at everything -- because the other students are zombies bent on taking over the city.
05	Don't Scream!	January 1, 2012	160	0-545-28937-8
The Story-Keeper hears Jack Harmon's story about the time he found a cell phone on the bus and gets a call from a girl -- who turns out to be an invisible entity haunting him through electronic devices and looking for a human body.
06	The Birthday Party of No Return	April 1, 2012	132	0-545-28938-6
The Story-Keeper hears Lee Hargrove's story about the time he wished he could be lucky like his friend Cory Duckworth. He even has a crush on Laura Groden. Lee receives a good luck charm in the mail - but it brings nothing of the sort.

== Characters ==
The main protagonists in the HorrorLand series.

List indicators

- (Own Book) indicates the character appeared in their own book with their own experience.
- (HorrorLand) indicates the character was invited or has been to the HorrorLand amusement park.
- (Chiller House) indicates the character was invited to the Chiller House in the HorrorLand amusement park.
- (Hall of Horrors) indicates the character has visited the Hall of Horrors in the HorrorLand amusement park.
- (s) indicates that a different main character was in the same book.
- (A Grey Cell) indicates the character did not appear in their own book, has visited HorrorLand, or was invited to the Chiller House.
- (a) indicates that all the characters above a are in this book.
- (b) indicates that all the characters between a and b are in this book.

Book	Book Number	Character	Goosebumps HorrorLand Series			
Book	Book Number	Character	Own Book	HorrorLand	Chiller House	Hall of Horrors
Revenge of the Living Dummy	#1	Britney Crosby	Main			
Revenge of the Living Dummy	#1 (s)	Molly Molloy	Main			
Creep From the Deep	#2	Billy Deep	Main			
Creep From the Deep	#2 (s)	Sheena Deep	Main			
Monster Blood for Breakfast	#3	Matt Daniels	Main			
Monster Blood for Breakfast	#3 (s)	Livvy Daniels	Main			
Monster Blood for Breakfast	#3 (s)	Bradley Wormser	Main			
The Scream of the Haunted Mask	#4	Carly-Beth Caldwell	Main			
The Scream of the Haunted Mask	#4 (s)	Sabrina Mason	Main			
Dr. Maniac vs. Robby Schwartz	#5	Robby Schwartz	Main			
Who's Your Mummy?	#6	Abby Martin	Main			
Who's Your Mummy?	#6 (s)	Peter Martin	Main			
My Friends Call Me Monster	#7	Michael Munroe	Main			
Say Cheese And Die Screaming	#8	Julie Martin	Main			
Welcome to Camp Slither	#9	Boone Dixon	Main			
Welcome to Camp Slither	#9 (s)	Heather Dixon	Main			
Help! We Have Strange Powers!	#10	Jillian Gerard	Main			
Help! We Have Strange Powers!	#10 (s)	Jackson Gerard	Main			
Escape From HorrorLand	#11	Lizzy Morris		Main		
Escape From HorrorLand	#11 (s)	Luke Morris		Main		
The Streets of Panic Park	#12	(a)	Main			
When the Ghost Dog Howls	#13	Andy Meadows	Main			
When the Ghost Dog Howls	#13 (s)	Marnie Meadows	Main			
Little Shop of Hamsters	#14	Sam Waters	Main			
Heads, You Lose	#15	Jessica Bowen	Main			
Heads, You Lose	#15 (s)	Ryan Chang	Main			
Weirdo Halloween	#16	Meg Oliver	Main			
Weirdo Halloween	#16 (s)	Chris Oliver	Main			
The Wizard of Ooze	#17	Marco Gonzales	Main			
The Wizard of Ooze	#17 (s)	Gabriella Smith	Main			
Slappy New Year	#18	Ray Gordon	Main			
Slappy New Year	#18 (s)	Brandon Gordon	Main			
The Horror at Chiller House	#19	(b)	Main			
Claws!	#20	Mickey Coe	Main			Main
Claws!	#20 (s)	Amanda Underwood	Main			
Night of Giant Everything	#21	Steven Sweeny	Main			Main
Night of Giant Everything	#21	Ava Munroe	Main			
Night of Giant Everything	#21	Courtney Jackson	Main			
The Five Masks of Dr. Screem	#22	Monica Anderson	Main			Main
The Five Masks of Dr. Screem	#22 (s)	Peter Anderson	Main			
Why I Quit Zombie School	#23	Matt Krinsky	Main			Main
Why I Quit Zombie School	#23 (s)	Jamie Krinsky	Main			
Don't Scream	#24	Jack Harmon	Main			Main
Don't Scream	#24 (s)	Eli Grassman	Main			
The Birthday Party of No Return	#25	Lee Hargrove	Main			Main
The Birthday Party of No Return	#25 (s)	Cory Duckworth	Main			
The Birthday Party of No Return	#25 (s)	Laura Groden	Main			

== Companion websites ==
The series is complemented by companion websites.

=== Enter HorrorLand ===
The website EnterHorrorLand.com is a "gameplay experience which immerses fans in HorrorLand itself". It is based around twelve map sections corresponding to each HorrorLand book, each of which includes numerous mini-games. The premise of each map section is that the antagonist of the corresponding book is trying to take over that area of HorrorLand; the minigames tell the story of each antagonist's defeat by the player. Strangely, the player is frequently represented by Mr. Wood, the main antagonist from Night of the Living Dummy. Guidance and help are provided by the automated fortune teller named Madame Doom. The front page features two short animated movies, "What to Expect in HorrorLand" and "An Interview with Slappy", with a blank option suggesting a third to come. The site opened on February 20, 2008. The site was redirected to Scholastic.com/Goosebumps/HorrorLand in November 2009.

=== Escape HorrorLand ===
The website EscapeHorrorLand.com was a "serialized, story-driven, fact-finding experience" hosted by the protagonists of One Day at HorrorLand. It was ostensibly a blog that sought out, posted evidence and information about the HorrorLand theme park, and was written by Luke Morris of One Day at HorrorLand. His sister Lizzy also contributed to the site, largely in the form of extracts from a "Welcome to HorrorLand" guidebook (ultimately printed separately as Welcome to HorrorLand: A Survival Guide). Luke's friend Clay was also mentioned. Luke and Lizzy received HorrorLand correspondence from Madame Doom, the mysterious "MONSTER-X", who tells the Morrises that HorrorLand has changed, and Slappy the Dummy. Several of the correspondence props appear within the HorrorLand books themselves. The site opened on February 14, 2008, and ceased updating its blog on August 22, 2008; the HorrorLand survival guide had only ten of its twelve chapters posted. The site was closed and redirected to Scholastic.com/Goosebumps/HorrorLand in November 2009.

== Video game ==
Scholastic Book Company released a Goosebumps HorrorLand video game on October 28, 2008, to tie into the series, on the Nintendo DS, Wii, and PlayStation 2 platforms. Developed by Gusto Games in Derby, the plot follows a young child and his/her friends trapped in HorrorLand, where they must make their way through challenging levels to escape the evil theme park. Reports indicate the game is similar to the original Goosebumps HorrorLand game Goosebumps: Escape from Horrorland, in which players had to beat the minigames of various levels to reveal who was behind events in the park and get back home. The official website reveals that HorrorLand in the game would have five main areas: Vampire Village (which serves as a hub connecting all the others), Mad Labs, Terror Tombs (an Egyptian-themed area), Fever Swamp, and the Carnival of Screams. Several of these areas are references to classic Goosebumps books or previous depictions of HorrorLand.
