= Goosebumps Series 2000 =

Spin-off of the Goosebumps series by R. L. Stine

Goosebumps Series 2000 is the successor to the original Goosebumps series by R. L. Stine. The cover design of the Series 2000 books was different from the original books, though the cover art was again by the same person, Tim Jacobus. There was no back tagline anymore, and the paragraphs at the back were excerpts from the book rather than a short summary of the story as the original books' back covers had. There was another difference with back covers too, as the "Reader Beware, You're In For A Scare!" of the original series was changed to "2000 Times The Scares!" and "Welcome to the new millennium of fear". Originally there was supposed to be 40 books, but only 25 books were printed because of a dispute that Parachute Press had with Scholastic. A 26th book, called The Incredible Shrinking Fifth Grader was planned and while it was canceled, Stine retooled it into a standalone book called The Adventures of Shrink Man.

The main subject of the covers, the title, and R. L. Stine were printed in raised print, something only Goosebumps HorrorLand has other than Series 2000.

== Sequels to Goosebumps books ==
A few of the Goosebumps Series 2000 books were sequels to original Goosebumps books. Below is a list of those books:

- Bride of the Living Dummy and Slappy's Nightmare (sequels to Night of the Living Dummy 3)
- Return to Horrorland (sequel to One Day At Horrorland)
- Return to Ghost Camp (sequel to Ghost Camp) but by name alone. It does not have anything to do with the original book.

== Episodes in the TV series ==
The first two books, Cry of the Cat and Bride of the Living Dummy, were adapted for the Goosebumps television series, with the former being a two-part episode.

== Books ==
#	Title	Original published date	Pages	ISBN
01	Cry of the Cat	December 1997	119	0-590-39988-8
Allison accidentally kills a vicious cat named Rip who later comes back to life and scratches her. Soon Allison begins acting like a cat -- and learns that Rip was the product of an animal testing experiment gone wrong.
02	Bride of the Living Dummy	January 1998	122	0-590-39990-X
Slappy the Dummy has been found by a young ventriloquist named Jimmy O'James. When Jimmy realizes that his dummy Slappy is evil, he gives it to a girl named Jillian Zinman who is fed up with her young sisters Katie and Amanda's ugly oversized doll Mary Ellen, but when strange accidents start to happen in the house and the words "I want my bride" are found scrawled on her mirror, Jillian and her friend Harrison must find out if it's Slappy back to his old tricks or if there's a new evil.
03	Creature Teacher	February 1998	125	0-590-39989-6
A preteen prankster Paul Perez is sent to a boarding school to straighten out his behavior and must save his friends from being listed on the food chain chart of a teacher with a monstrous appetite for bad kids named Mrs. Maaargh.
04	Invasion of the Body Squeezers Part 1	March 1998	119	0-590-39991-8
Part 1 of 2. UFO enthusiast Jack Archer deals with his creepy neighbor Mr. Fleshman and an alien invasion caused by a meteorite crash.
05	Invasion of the Body Squeezers Part 2	April 1998	120	0-590-39992-6
Conclusion. Jack Archer tries to fight off the Body Squeezers, a race of aliens that possess people by hugging them. He also discovers that Mr. Fleshman is one of them.
06	I Am Your Evil Twin	May 1998	126	0-590-39993-4
Montgomery "Monty" Adams is staying with his scientist uncle in Pittsburgh, Pennsylvania while his mother Mrs. Adams is spending a couple months in the southeastern part of Asia. Luckily for Monty, his cousin Nan is the same age as him and the 2 get along swimmingly until Monty discovers that he's the product of a cloning experiment and an evil clone is out to take over his life.
07	Revenge R Us	June 1998	118	0-590-39994-2
Wade Brill is constantly tortured by her 17-year-old brother Micah. When Micah backs his car over Wade's bike, she decides to go to "Revenge R Us", a strange place where people can pay to get their revenge on others, but soon discovers a flaw in her plans.
08	Fright Camp	July 1998	144	0-590-39995-0
Andrew and his brother Tyler love RB Farraday's scary movies and were invited to spend the summer at a camp based on the director's horror films, but soon discover that the film frights may be based on reality.
09	Are You Terrified Yet?	August 1998	112	0-590-39996-9
A cowardly boy named Craig Morgenstern must maintain his reputation for bravery after allegedly saving a baby from a car accident and moving to a new town, but that proves to be difficult when the local bullies force him to prove that he is not a wimp by sticking his hand in a jar of live spiders and spending the night in the town's mortuary.
10	Headless Halloween	September 1998	114	0-590-76781-X
Brandon Plush, a young boy who lives to terrorize the young and innocent, is planning on trashing a mean teacher's house on Halloween, but when the prank backfires, Brandon finds himself in a strange neighborhood run by a headless ghost who wants Brandon to do 3 good deeds to be able to leave.
11	Attack of the Graveyard Ghouls	October 1998	121	0-590-76783-6
Spencer Levy has an out-of-body experience courtesy of a ghoul who possesses his body as punishment for knocking over his tombstone during a school field trip.
12	Brain Juice	November 1998	144	0-590-76784-4
Nathan and Lindy Nichols, step-siblings known for being the stupidest kids in school drink a brain energizer left behind by 2 aliens in search of intelligent human life for their intergalactic master.
13	Return to HorrorLand	December 1998	120	0-590-18733-3
Lizzy, her brother Luke and their friend Clay from One Day in Horrorland return to the monstrous amusement park as part of a plan to reveal Horrorland's existence on a tabloid news show and soon discover that the reporters they trust aren't who they seem.
14	Jekyll and Heidi	January 1999	117	0-590-68517-1
An orphaned girl named Heidi Davison moves in with her uncle Dr. Jekyll who is being targeted by the townspeople who were accusing him of being behind the late night attacks on their town.
15	Scream School	February 1999	117	0-590-68519-8
Jake Banyon, the son of the Scream School director Emory Banyon sets out to scare his father after being traumatized by a sadistic practical joke on his 13th birthday.
16	The Mummy Walks	March 1999	119	0-590-68520-1
A routine trip to Florida is revealed to be a case of international intrigue and horror as Michael Clarke is sent to the fictitious, war-torn Middle-Eastern country known as Jezekiah, which has been waiting for the day that the prince will return with information on the location of a cursed mummy.
17	The Werewolf in the Living Room	April 1999	116	0-590-68521-X
Aaron Freidus and his father Mr. Freidus were hunters who capture an innocent man named Ben who may be a werewolf who has terrorized the town, but when Aaron begins having nightmares of bloodshed and death, he discovers that he could be the culprit.
18	Horrors of the Black Ring	May 1999	108	0-590-68522-8
When Beth Evans' favorite teacher is arrested for kidnapping Beth's little sister at the school carnival, Beth discovers a ring with a ghoulish face on it and keeps it which brings out the evil in anyone who wears it.
19	Return to Ghost Camp	June 1999	112	0-590-68523-6
While on a bus ride to Camp Spirit Moon, Dustin befriends a boy named Ari who suggests that the 2 switch places, which makes Dustin (as Ari) the most popular kid in the camp until he learns that a boy named Ari has been named the camp's newest sacrifice to a forest monster known as "The Snatcher".
20	Be Afraid – Be Very Afraid!	July 1999	118	0-590-68524-4
Connor Buckley finds a board game at a yard sale that is more than it appears to be.
21	The Haunted Car	August 1999	118	0-590-68529-5
Mitchell's family the Monians just bought a new car which was last driven by a girl who died in an accident from a joyride. The only problem is the girl's spirit still haunts the car and is looking at Mitchell to ride with her into the afterlife.
22	Full Moon Fever	September 1999	121	0-590-68530-9
On Halloween night, Robbie and Alesha succumb to an illness called "Full Moon Fever" which metamorphoses anyone who looks at the full moon into ravenous, unspecified, snarling beasts. Robbie and Alesha go on a journey to find a cure only to discover that their illness is really a curse.
23	Slappy's Nightmare	October 1999	112	0-590-68535-X
After ruining yet another one of his ventriloquist acts, Jimmy O'James decides to get rid of Slappy the Dummy and get a new dummy named Wally, his identical twin brother who was carved from the same coffin. Wally tells Jimmy how to control Slappy's evil by forcing him to do 3 good deeds within a week. Slappy is given to a little girl and must do the deeds or get put to sleep forever.
24	Earth Geeks Must Go!	November 1999	114	0-590-68537-6
Self-proclaimed average boy Jacob Miller finds himself on a planet that seems to be like Earth, but is really a backwards alien planet with the population bent on capturing "Earth geeks."
25	Ghost in the Mirror	December 1999	110	0-439-13535-4
Jason Sloves finally gets new furniture for his room including a mirror that serves as a portal to a dimension of body snatching crab people.
26	The Incredible Shrinking Fifth Grader	Cancelled	N/A	
27	When The Snake Bites	Cancelled	N/A	
