= Tim Jacobus =

American artist (born 1959)

- Jacobus at Dragon Con in 2026
- Born: April 21, 1959 (age 67)
- Occupation: Artist

Tim Jacobus (/dʒəˈkoʊbəs/; born April 21, 1959) is an American artist best known for illustrating the covers for nearly one hundred books in R. L. Stine's Goosebumps series. He has done over three hundred book covers and paintings for various different series, novels and video games. He currently resides in New Jersey, doing most of his art digitally.

Jacobus graduated from Morris Knolls High School, where he played prep football and began taking art classes. He attended the Spectrum Institute for the Advertising Arts in Hillsborough Township, New Jersey.

A lifelong resident of New Jersey, Jacobus lives in the Budd Lake section of Mount Olive Township, having earlier lived in Denville Township and the Lake Hopatcong section of Jefferson Township.

== Works ==
Sources:

- Null-A Three - Book Cover (1985)
- Star Trek: The Promethean Prophecy - Game Cover (1986)
- Star Trek: First Contact - Game Cover (1988)
- Green City in the Sun - Book Covers (1988)
- Strange Devices of the Sun and Moon - Book Cover (1993)
- Goosebumps - All Book Covers except #2 and #12 (1992–1997)
- Goosebumps Series 2000 - All Book Covers (1998–1999)
- Goosebumps Triple Header books, Give Yourself Goosebumps #1, Tales To Give You Goosebumps, Goosebumps Live On Stage: Screams In The Night (1997–1998), (1995), (1994–1997), (1998)
- Deadtime Stories - Various Book Covers (1996)
- Bone Chillers - Various Book Covers (1998)
- Spinetinglers - Various Book Covers (1995–1998)
- Merry Christmas, Teletubbies! - Book Cover (1999)
- Casket Case - Album Cover (2014)
- Ravage - Return of the Spectral Rider - Album Cover (2017)
- Frightland: The Wildman of Shaggy Creek - Book Cover (2021)
