= Goosebumps (comics) =

Comic book series

Goosebumps Graphix
- Author: R. L. Stine, Gabriel Hernandez, Greg Ruth, Scott Morse
- Language: English
- Series: Goosebumps Graphix
- Genre: Horror fiction, Children's literature
- Publisher: Scholastic
- Publication date: September 1, 2006
- Publication place: United States
- Media type: Print (Paperback and Hardcover)
- Pages: 144 (first edition)
- ISBN: 0-439-84124-0
- OCLC: 70582931
- Followed by: Terror Trips

From 2006 to 2019, several comic book adaptations have been printed, based on the Goosebumps books by R. L. Stine. The first was Creepy Creatures, a graphic novel compilation book in the Goosebumps Graphix line. This series began when Stine starting receiving letters from fans asking him to write more Goosebumps books. The comics have been adaptations from 10 original books and new stories from various artists. IDW Publishing would produce Goosebumps comics that were more original stories but contain characters from the books.

== List of Goosebumps comics ==
=== Scholastic Publishing ===
#	Title	Original published date	Pages	ISBN
01	Creepy Creatures	September 1, 2006	144	0-439-84124-0
02	Terror Trips	March 1, 2007	144	0-439-85780-5
03	Scary Summer	July 1, 2007	144	0-439-85782-1
04	Slappy's Tales of Horror	August 25, 2015	176	0-545-83595-X

=== IDW Publishing ===
#	Title	Original published date	Pages	ISBN
01	Monsters at Midnight	October 2017 - February 2018	72	1-684-05155-X
02	Download and Die!	March 2018 - May 2018	72	1-684-05322-6
03	Horrors of the Witch House	March 2019 - May 2019	80	1-684-05539-3
04	Secrets of the Swamp	September 2020 - Early 2021	120	1-684-05813-9

== Scholastic Publishing ==
From 2006 to 2015, Scholastic printed 4 Goosebumps Graphix books. Each book contained multiple classic stories presented as a graphic novel, each by a different artist. 10 stories in total were presented in 4 volumes in paperback and hardcover.

=== Creepy Creatures ===
This book includes the following graphic novel adaptations: The Werewolf of Fever Swamp adapted and illustrated by Gabriel Hernandez, The Scarecrow Walks At Midnight adapted and illustrated by Greg Ruth and The Abominable Snowman of Pasadena adapted and illustrated by Scott Morse. It was released in September 2006.

=== Terror Trips ===
This book includes the following graphic novel adaptations: Deep Trouble adapted and illustrated by Amy Kimberly Ganter, One Day At Horrorland adapted and illustrated by Jill Thompson and A Shocker on Shock Street adapted and illustrated by James Tolagson. It was released in March 2007.

=== Scary Summer ===
This book includes the following graphic novel adaptations: The Horror At Camp Jellyjam adapted and illustrated by Kyle Baker, Ghost Beach adapted and illustrated by Ted Naifeh and Revenge of The Lawn Gnomes adapted and illustrated by Dean Haspiel. It was released in July 2007.

=== Slappy's Tales of Horror ===
This book includes the following graphic novel adaptations: A Shocker on Shock Street adapted and illustrated by James Tolagson, The Werewolf of Fever Swamp adapted and illustrated by Gabriel Hernandez, Ghost Beach adapted and illustrated by Ted Naifeh and Night of The Living Dummy adapted and illustrated by Dave Roman. It was released in August 2015.

== IDW Publishing ==
From 2017 to 2020, IDW Publishing had published 4 original comic series entitled Monsters at Midnight, Download and Die!, Horrors of the Witch House and Secrets of the Swamp. Each contained 3-5 issues and told original stories featuring new and classic Goosebumps characters. Each were later released as a trade paperback.

=== Monsters At Midnight ===
This 3-issue series features an original story by author Jeremy Lambert with a special foreword by author R. L. Stine and illustrations by Chris Fenoglio. Individual issues were released from October 2017-February 2018 with a trade paperback released in April 2018.

=== Download And Die! ===
This 3-issue series features an original story by author Jen Vaughn with a special foreword by author R. L. Stine and illustrations by Michelle Wong. Individual issues were released from March 2018-May 2018 with a trade paperback released in September 2018.

=== Horrors of The Witch House ===
This 3-issue series features an original story by authors Denton J. Tipton and Matthew Dow Smith with illustrations by Chris Fenoglio. Individual issues are planned for release from March 2019-May 2019 with a trade paperback released in November 2019.

=== Secrets of The Swamp ===
This 5-issue series features an original story by Marieke Nijkamp with illustrations by Yasmin Flores Montanez and colors by Rebecca Nalty. Individual issues are planned for release from September 2020-Early 2021 with a trade paperback released in May 2021.
