= Dean Haspiel =

American comics writer/artist

- Haspiel at Dragon Con in 2026
- Born: Dean Edmund Haspiel; May 31, 1967 (age 59) New York City, U.S.
- Areas: Cartoonist, Writer, Illustrator, Playwright
- Pseudonym: Dino
- Notable works: Billy Dogma; The Red Hook; The Quitter; Keyhole
- Awards: Emmy Award, 2010; Ringo Award, 2017

Dean Edmund Haspiel (born May 31, 1967, in New York City) is an American comic book artist, writer, and playwright. He is known for creating Billy Dogma, The Red Hook, and for his collaborations with writer Harvey Pekar on his American Splendor series as well as the graphic novel The Quitter, and for his collaborations with Jonathan Ames on The Alcoholic and HBO's Bored to Death. He has been nominated for numerous Eisner Awards, and won a 2010 Emmy Award for TV design work.

== Early life ==
Haspiel grew up on Manhattan's Upper West Side and attended The High School of Music & Art/Fiorello H. LaGuardia High School, graduating in 1985.

In the mid-1980s, Haspiel worked at Upstart Associates (a shared studio space on West 29th Street in New York City) as an assistant for Howard Chaykin on American Flagg! and for Walter Simonson on Thor; he also worked (at a different studio) as an assistant for Bill Sienkiewicz on New Mutants and Elektra: Assassin. Later, Haspiel attended the State University of New York at Purchase, first majoring in illustration and eventually switching to film.

== Career ==
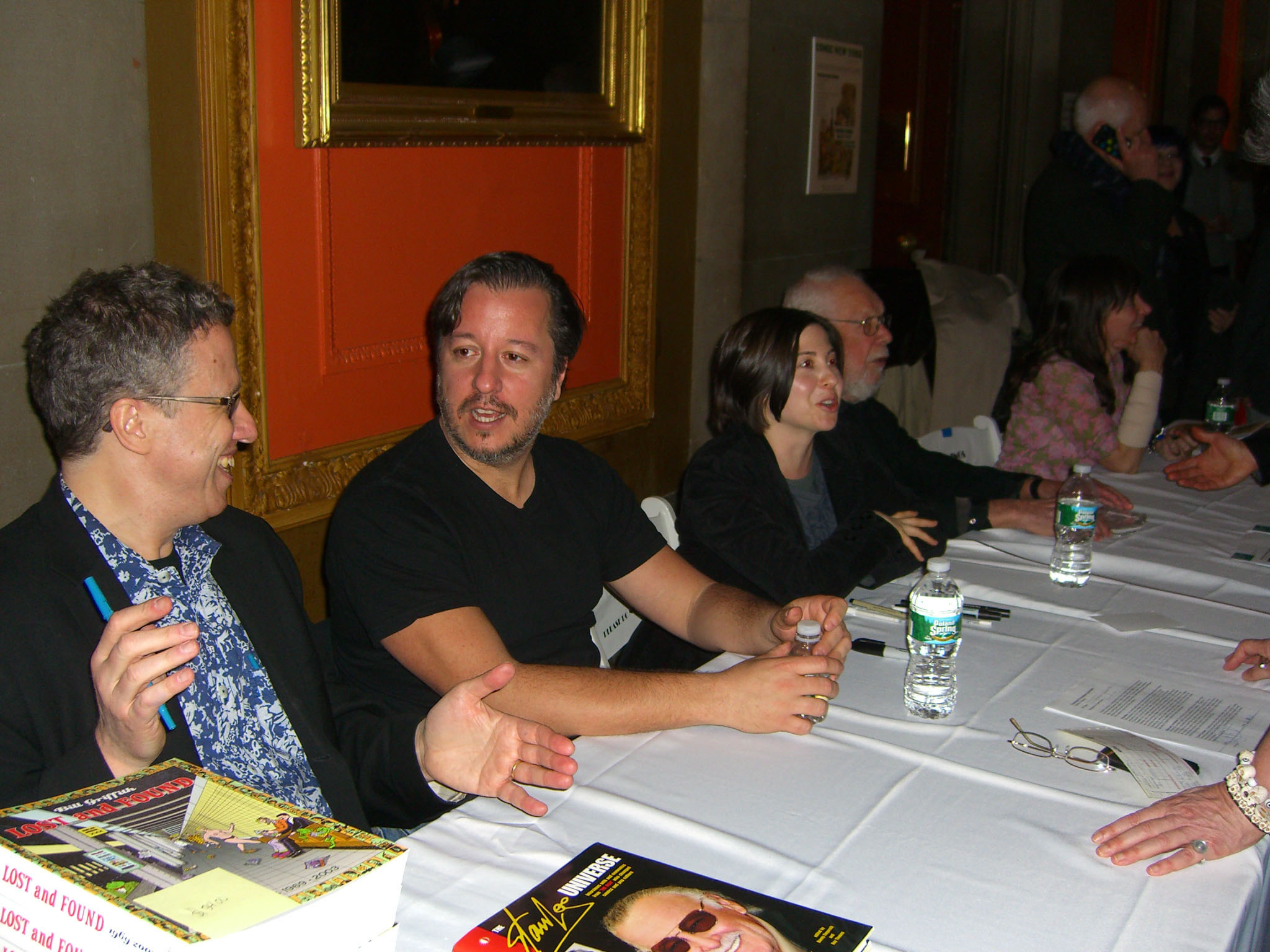
Haspiel at the 2012 Comic New York symposium at Columbia University. Sitting with Haspiel are (left to right) Danny Fingeroth, Miss Lasko-Gross, Al Jaffee, and Tracy White.

In 1987, while still an undergraduate, Haspiel inaugurated his professional comics career when he co-created The Verdict with Martin Powell. Haspiel went on to co-create the two-man comics anthology Keyhole with cartoonist Josh Neufeld (a fellow graduate of LaGuardia High School).

Haspiel's "last romantic anti-hero" Billy Dogma made his comic book debut in Keyhole, and has appeared in a number of comics and graphic novels since then, published by the likes of Top Shelf Productions, Alternative Comics, Z2 Comics, Image Comics, and Hang Dai Editions.

Haspiel was a long-time collaborator with Harvey Pekar on American Splendor. The culmination of their work together was the 104-page nonfiction graphic novel The Quitter, published by Vertigo in 2005.

In 2006 Haspiel spearheaded the foundation of ACT-I-VATE, a webcomics collective which featured the works of founding members Haspiel, Dan Goldman, Nick Bertozzi, Michel Fiffe, Leland Purvis, Nikki Cook, Tim Hamilton, and Josh Neufeld. (In 2009, IDW Publishing published the ACT-I-VATE Primer, which featured an original Haspiel story as well as work by other members of the collective.)

In fall 2008, Vertigo released the original graphic novel The Alcoholic, written by Jonathan Ames and drawn by Haspiel; the book was re-issued in 2018. Also in 2008, Françoise Mouly's Toon Books published Mo and Jo: Fighting Together Forever, written by Jay Lynch and drawn by Haspiel. In 2008, Haspiel serialized Street Code, a webcomic for Zuda Comics, after editing the webcomics anthology Next-Door Neighbor for SMITH Magazine.

In 2010, IDW/Graphic NYC Presents published the monograph Dean Haspiel: The Early Years, by writer Christopher Irving. That same year, Haspiel illustrated Inverna Lockpez's Cuba: My Revolution, published by Vertigo. The book was covered by, among others, NPR's Tell Me More, the New York Post, and Graphic Novel Reporter. Also in 2010, Haspiel won an Emmy Award for outstanding main title design for the HBO show Bored to Death.

In 2011, Haspiel helped spearhead the creation of Trip City, "a Brooklyn-filtered, multimedia, literary arts salon featuring free regular exclusive content created by a fellowship of 21st Century auteurs." For a period, it was the online home of new Haspiel comics and postings. Haspiel's Fear, My Dear: A Billy Dogma Experience was published by Z2 Comics in 2014.

Beginning in 2016, Haspiel wrote and drew the serialized webcomic The Red Hook, about a master thief living in the "New Brooklyn Universe," for Webtoon. The series ran for four seasons before ending in 2021.

In 2019, Haspiel and long-time collaborator Josh Neufeld launched a weekly podcast, Scene by Scene with Josh & Dean, that focused on Harvey Pekar and the American Splendor movie.

== Bibliography ==
=== Comics ===
==== Graphic novels/trade paperbacks ====
- Daydream Lullabies: a Billy Dogma Experience (Top Shelf Productions, 1999)
- Opposable Thumbs (Alternative Comics, 2001)
- (with writer Harvey Pekar) The Quitter (Vertigo, 2005)
- (with writer Jonathan Ames) The Alcoholic (Vertigo, 2008)
- (with writer Jay Lynch) Mo and Jo: Fighting Together Forever (Toon Books, 2008)
- (with writer Inverna Lockpez) Cuba: My Revolution (Vertigo, 2010)
- Fear, My Dear: A Billy Dogma Experience. Z2 Comics. July 1, 2014. ISBN 978-1940878010.
- (with writers Mark Waid and J. M. DeMatteis) The Fox: Freak Magnet (Archie Comics, 2014)
- Beef with Tomato (Alternative Comics, 2015)
- (with writer Mark Waid) The Fox: Fox Hunt (Archie Comics, 2018)
- The Red Hook Volume 1: New Brooklyn (Image Comics, 2018)
- The Red Hook Volume 2: War Cry (Image Comics, 2019)
- (co-editor with Whitney Matheson and contributor) Pandemix: Quarantine Comics in the Age of 'Rona (self-published, 2020)

==== Creator series and one-shots ====
- (with writer Martin Powell) The Verdict, 4-issue limited series (Eternity Comics, 1987)
- (shared with Josh Neufeld) Keyhole (1996–1998)
  - #1–4 (Millennium Publications, 1996–1997)
  - #5–6 (Top Shelf Productions, 1998)
  - #7 ("#25") (Hang Dai Productions, 2021)
- Billy Dogma #1–3 (Millennium Publications, 1997)
- (with writer James Merendino) SLC Punk! (Straight Edge Productions/Lulu Publishing, 1999)
- Boy In My Pocket: The Billy Dogma Experiences (Top Shelf Productions, 2003)
- (with writer Evan Dorkin) The Thing: Night Falls on Yancy Street, 4-issue limited series (Marvel Comics, 2003)
- Aim To Dazzle: a Billy Dogma Experience (Alternative Comics, 2004)
- (shared with Michel Fiffe) Brawl, 3-issue limited series (Image Comics, 2007)
- Dean Haspiel's Psychotronic Comix (Hang Dai Editions, 2013)
- Billy Dogma: Heart-Shaped Hole (Hang Dai Editions, 2015)
- (shared with Josh Neufeld) Because of You (Hang Dai Editions, 2017)
- Covid Cop (self-published, 2023)
- Billy Dogma & Jane Legit (self-published, 2023)
- The Red Hook X Dean Haspiel (self-published, 2024)
- Chest Face (self-published, 2025)

==== Webcomics ====
- Immortal (Act-i-vate, 2006)
- Fear, My Dear (Act-i-vate, 2007)
- Street Code (Zuda Comics, 2008)
- (co-editor and contributor) Next-Door Neighbor anthology (Smith Magazine, 2008)
- (with writer Tim Hall) The Last Mortician (Tor.com, 2011)
- The Red Hook (Line Webtoon, 2016–2021)
  - Season 1: "New Brooklyn" (2016)
  - Season 2: "War Cry" (2017–2018)
  - Season 3: "StarCross" (2019)
  - Season 4: "Blackout & PTSD" (2020–2021)

==== Stories/comics elsewhere ====
- (with writers Lewis Klahr & Steve Piersall) Detective Comics #589, 14-page story titled "Bonus Book #5: For the Love of Ivy" (DC Comics, 1988)
- (with writer David Levin) Justice League International #24, 14-page story titled "Bonus Book #13: Maxwell Lord" (DC Comics, 1989)
- (with writer Martin Powell) Caliber Presents #s 16–21, story titled "The Verdict: The Acolyte" (Caliber Comics, 1990)
- Negative Burn #27, 1-page story titled "Lionel's Lament" (Caliber Comics, 1995)
- (with cartoonist Josh Neufeld) Negative Burn #28, 1-page story titled "Lionel's Lament" (Caliber Comics, 1995)
- Negative Burn #32, 1-page story titled "You're Lying To Me" (Caliber Comics, 1996)
- Negative Burn #33, 2-page story titled "American Dilemma" starring Harvey Pekar (Caliber Comics, 1995)
- (with cartoonist Jessica Abel) SPX '97 anthology, "Lucky Love Limbo" (CBLDF, 1997)
- Minimum Wage #10 anthology, 6-page story titled "Open" (Fantagraphics, 1999)
- SPX '99 anthology, 2-page story titled "Buster Browns" (CBLDF, 1999)
- Day of Judgment: Secret Files, "Dr. Fate" pin-up (DC Comics, 1999)
- (with writer Harvey Pekar) American Splendor: Terminal anthology, 1-page story titled "Violation" (Dark Horse Comics, 1999)
- (with writer Harvey Pekar) American Splendor: Bedtime Stories anthology, 1-page story titled "The Good Times Are Gone" (Dark Horse Comics, 2000)
- (with writer Harvey Pekar) American Splendor: Portrait of the Author In His Declining Years anthology, 5-page story titled "Payback" (Dark Horse Comics, 2001)
- Expo 2001 anthology, 4-page story titled "The Big To Do" (CBLDF, 2001)
- (with writer Sam Henderson) Bizarro Comics anthology, 7-page story titled "Captain Marvel and the Sham Shazam" (DC Comics, 2001)
- 9–11: Emergency Relief anthology, 6-page story titled "91101" (Alternative Comics, 2002)
- (with writer Karl Bollers) Captain America: Red, White & Blue (Marvel Comics, 2002)
- (with writer Karl Bollers) Muties #3 (Marvel Comics, 2002)
- writer for Johnny Bravo in Cartoon Cartoons #12 (DC Comics, 2002)
- JLA-Z, Despero pin-up (DC Comics, 2003)
- (with writer Nick Bertozzi) X-Men Unlimited #40 anthology 12-page story titled "Slam" (Marvel Comics, 2003)
- (with writer Zeb Wells) Spider-Man's Tangled Web #20 (Marvel Comics, 2003)
- Alternative Comics #1, anthology, 4-page story titled "Aim to Dazzle" (Alternative Comics, 2003)
- (with writer Kevin McCarthy) The Amazing Adventures of the Escapist #3 (Dark Horse Comics, 2003)
- (with writers Gabe Soria and Vito Delsante) Batman Adventures #9 (reprinted in Batman Adventures: Shadows & Masks) (DC Comics, 2004)
- (with writer Keith Giffen) Justice League Adventures #32 (DC Comics, 2004)
- (with writer Harvey Pekar) Alternative Comics #2, anthology, 1-page story titled "Identity Crisis" (Alternative Comics, 2004)
- (with writer Harvey Pekar) The Amazing Adventures of the Escapist #8 titled "Escape From the Hospital" (Dark Horse Comics, 2005)
- (co-editor with Scott Morse and Chris Pitzer) Project: Superior anthology (AdHouse Books, 2005)
- Alternative Comics #3, anthology, 1-page story titled "Funny You Should Ask!" (Alternative Comics, 2005)
- (with writer Harvey Pekar) Bizarro World anthology, 5-page story titled "Bizarro Shmizarro" (DC Comics, 2005)
- (with writer Harvey Pekar) SPIN, 2-page story titled "Rock, Roll 'n' Randle" (2005)
- (with writer Harvey Pekar) Playboy, 2-page story titled "The Real Harvey" (2005)
- (with writers will.i.am and Kyle Anderson) SPIN, 1-page story titled "The Black Eyed Peas Storm Sting's Castle" (2005)
- (as writer only) Cartoon Network Block Party! #16 (DC Comics, 2006)
- (with writer Vito Delsante) Beowulf #7 (Fallout, Pt. 1) (Speakeasy Comics, 2006)
- (with writer Harvey Pekar) American Splendor #1 anthology, 20-page story titled "The Day's Highlights" (Vertigo, 2006)
- (with writer Harvey Pekar) American Splendor #2 anthology, 7-page story titled "Today I am a Man" (Vertigo, 2006)
- (with writer Harvey Pekar) American Splendor #3 anthology, 4-page story titled "The Battle of the Vacant Lot" (Vertigo, 2006)
- (with writer Harvey Pekar) American Splendor #4 anthology, 8-page story titled "New York City Signing" (Vertigo, 2007)
- (adaptation of writer R. L. Stine) Goosebumps Graphix #3: Scary Summer, story titled "The Revenge of the Lawn Gnomes" (GRAPHIX, 2007)
- (with writer Brian Wood) Vampirella #8 (Harris Comics, 2008)
- Popgun vol 2. anthology, story titled "Sex Planet" (Image Comics, 2008)
- (with writer Harvey Pekar) American Splendor: Season Two anthology #1, 1-page story titled "Hollywood Bob's Observation" (Vertigo, 2008)
- (with writer Harvey Pekar) American Splendor: Season Two anthology #2, 2-page story titled "Brought Up Short" (Vertigo, 2008)
- (with writer Harvey Pekar) American Splendor: Season Two anthology #3, 9-page story titled "Bop Philosophy" (Vertigo, 2008)
- (with writer Harvey Pekar) American Splendor: Season Two anthology #4, 5-page story titled "Cleopatra" (Vertigo, 2008)
- ACT-I-VATE Primer anthology, story titled "Bring Me the Heart of Billy Dogma" (IDW Publishing, 2009)
- (with writer Lee Black) Cyclops #1, 36-page story titled "The Bicycle Thief or: How Cyclops Got His Groove Back" (Marvel Comics, 2011)
- X-Men: First Class — Class Portraits anthology, story (Marvel Comics, 2011)
- Strange Tales II #2 anthology, story featuring Woodgod (Marvel Comics, 2011)
- The Amazing Spider-Man #692, 8-page story titled "Spider-Man For A Night" (Marvel Comics, 2012)

=== Illustrations ===
Dean Haspiel has contributed illustrations to the following projects:

- Video King, Mummy Monster Sign and The Scuzzbournes and various others for Nickelodeon Magazine
- Thor's Day for Shuttle Sheet magazine
- Pot Monkeys for High Times magazine
- various illustrations and covers for New York Press
- various illustrations and covers for The Austin Statesman American's XLent
- various illustrations and covers for Washington City Paper
- CD single cover for Cowboy Johnny Christ
- CD album cover for Yummy
- pin-up for David Yurkovich's Less Than Heroes graphic novel
- CD cover and 8pp comix foldout for comedian Mitch Fatel's Super Retardo

=== Film ===
- Assistant director for Rockville Pictures' Burnzy's Last Call
- Actor in McCann & Co. Films' Desolation Angels
- Comics for Good Machine's Happiness
- Production assistant for Good Machine's The Ice Storm
- Actor in Next In Line Productions' Moby Presents: Alien Sex Party
- Illustration for Good Machine's American Splendor
- Comics for Red Mountain Film's Jail Bait
- Illustrations for the HBO series Bored to Death

=== Theater ===
As playwright

- Switch to Kill (2014)
- Harakiri Kane (aka Die! Die, Again!) (2017)— featured Stoya
- The Last Bar at the End of the World (2018) — featured Stoya, Seth Gilliam, directed by Phillip Cruise
- The War of Woo (2022) — featured Seth Gilliam and Samantha Simone, directed by Philip Cruise

== Awards ==
- 2010 Emmy Award for outstanding main title design (for Bored to Death)
- 2017 Ringo Award for best webcomic for (The Red Hook)

=== Nominations ===
- 1997 Ignatz Award for Outstanding Comic (for Keyhole)
- 2002 Eisner Award for Talent Deserving of Wider Recognition
- 2003 Ignatz Award for Outstanding Artist (for Aim to Dazzle)
- 2008 Eisner Award for Best Digital Comic (for Billy Dogma: Immortal)
- 2018 Ringo Award for Best Webcomic (for War Cry)
- 2021 Ringo Award for Best Anthology (for Pandemix: Quarantine Comix in the Age of 'Rona)
