= Z2 Comics =

American publisher

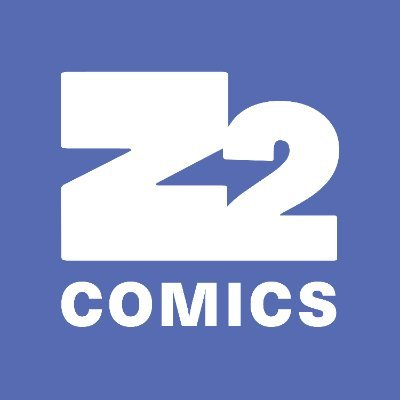
- Predecessor: Zip Comics
- Founded: 2010; 16 years ago
- Founder: Josh Frankel
- Headquarters: (editorial) New York City (distribution) 1812 South Parker Road, Denver, CO, 80231
- Key people: Sridhar Reddy (Publisher); Kevin Meek (CEO); Josh Bernstein (President); Aleksey Zelenberg (Chief technology officer)
- Products: Graphic novels, music, pop culture merchandise
- Number of employees: 30
- Website: z2comics.com

Z2 Comics is an American publisher of graphic novels, comic books, and popular culture merchandise. Known for its music-related projects and partnership with musical acts, the company uses "a data-driven approach to identify acts with strong followings across all musical genres, then recruits ... comics creators to produce the works".

== History ==
=== Zip Comics ===
The company began as Zip Comics, founded in 2010 by Josh Frankel with financing from an investor. The company's first publications were Frankel's own title, The Schizophrenic, illustrated by Toby Cypress; and Harvey Pekar's Cleveland, a nonfiction graphic novel written by Pekar and illustrated by Joseph Remnant; the book was co-published with Top Shelf Productions and released after Pekar's death.

=== Relaunch as Z2 Comics ===
The company was relaunched in 2014 as Z2 Comics, with its first two titles being graphic novel collections from alternative comics creators Dean Haspiel and Paul Pope. In the period 2015–2016, Z2 released a couple of other graphic novels and a selection of comic book limited series.

=== Shift to music ===
In 2016, Z2 Comics "began collaborating with musicians to create graphic novels centered on unique stories and exclusive music". The first two such projects, published by Z2 in 2017, were The Wonderful World of Perfecto: With Paul Oakenfold and Friends, and Murder Ballads, which was accompanied by an original soundtrack by Dan Auerbach and Robert Finley. 2018's Apocrypha: The Legend of Babymetal is one of the company's best-selling books.

Z2's Tori Amos: Little Earthquakes, The Graphic Album was nominated for three 2023 Eisner Awards: Best Short Story for "Silent All These Years" by David W. Mack, Best Anthology, and Best Adaptation from Another Medium.

In the fall of 2022, company founder Josh Frankel left Z2, eventually joining IDW Publishing. By this time, the company had grown from three employees to 30.

== Overview ==
Z2 Comics specializes in authorized partnerships. Musicians with whom Z2 Comics has worked include Gorillaz, Self Defense Family, Dan Auerbach of The Black Keys, DJ Paul Oakenfold, Tori Amos, John Cooper of Skillet, Andy Biersack of Black Veil Brides, Jimmy Eat World, Machine Gun Kelly, Yungblud, Oliver Tree, and BABYMETAL.

Many Z2 Comics graphic novels (or anthologies of stories) are accompanied by an original "soundtrack" by the artist/band in question. Examples include Murder Ballads (Dan Auerbach and Robert Finley, 2017), Genesis 1 (Poppy, 2019), Chasin' the Bird: A Charlie Parker Graphic Novel (2020; the deluxe edition of which was packaged with vinyl recordings of two previously unreleased Parker tracks), This is Where We Fall (Mitski, 2021), and Superstate (Graham Coxon, 2022).

Other projects use classic recordings as springboards for comics anthologies. Examples include Anthrax: Among the Living (2021), The Doors: Morrison Hotel (2021), Machine Gun Kelly's Hotel Diablo (2021), Little Earthquakes, The Graphic Album (Tori Amos, 2022), Blondie: Against the Odds (2022), King Diamond's Abigail (2022), Joan Jett & the Blackhearts 40x40: Bad Reputation / I Love Rock-n-Roll (2022), Jefferson Starship: Blows Against the Empire (Paul Kantner, 2022) (which included a limited edition Blows Against The Empire LP on colored vinyl), and The Illustrated Al: The Songs of "Weird Al" Yankovic (2023).

In addition to distributing its products through the typical book and graphic novel platforms, Z2 also utilizes a robust direct-to-consumer system via its website. Many Z2 Comics projects include standard and deluxe editions.

== Titles published ==
=== Comics series ===
- Josh Frankel (w), Toby Cypress (a). The Schizophrenic, no. 1 (2010).
- Free Comic Book Day:
  - Comics Lab!!! (May 2016). — contributions from Tyler Boss, Jarrett Williams, Ian McGinty, Chris Hunt, Alexis Ziritt, Michael Moreci, Matt Battaglia, Miss Lasko-Gross, and Kevin Colden
  - Gabe Soria (w), Warren Pleece (a). The Ballad of Franklin Bonisteel (May 2017).
- Miss Lasko-Gross and Kevin Colden (w, a). The Sweetness, no. 1-4 (2016).
- Chris Hunt (w, a). Carver: A Paris Story, no. 1-5 (2015–2016).
- Ian McGinty (w, a). Welcome to Showside (2015–2016). — creator-owned series
- Michael Moreci (w), Matt Battaglia (a). Indoctrination, no. 1-5 (2016).
- Samuel Sattin (w), Chris Kohler (a). Legend, no. 1-5 (2016).

=== General graphic novels ===
- Dean Haspiel (w, a). Fear, My Dear: A Billy Dogma Experience, pp. 160 (July 1, 2014). ISBN 978-1940878010
- Miss Lasko-Gross (w, a). Henni, pp. 168 (January 6, 2015). ISBN 978-1940878027
- Harvey Pekar (w), Joseph Remnant (a). Harvey Pekar's Cleveland, pp. 128 (May 1, 2012). ISBN 978-1603090919 — co-published with Top Shelf Productions
- Paul Pope (w, a). Escapo, pp. 160 (July 1, 2014). ISBN 978-1940878003 — reissue of a 1999 self-published work
- Koren Shadmi (w, a). The Abaddon, pp. 240 (November 10, 2015). ISBN 978-1940878058 — originally a webcomic; loosely based on Jean-Paul Sartre’s existential play No Exit
- Will Tracy and Gabe Koplowitz (w), Miguel Porto and Kendra Wells (a). Allen, Son of Hellcock, pp. 136 (November 14, 2017). ISBN 978-1940878089
- Jarrett Williams (w, a). Hyperforce Neo, pp. 144 (2017). ISBN 9781940878126

=== Music-related titles (selected) ===
- Aaron, Jason; Cady, Ryan (2021). Sound and Fury. Z2 Comics. ISBN 978-1-9408-7835-5. — art by Takashi Okazaki, Vasilis Lolos, Rosi Kampe, Rufus Dayglo and Josan González
- Adkins, Jim; Paknadel, Alex (15 June 2021). Jimmy Eat World: 555. Iron Circus Comics. ISBN 9781945820793. — illustrated by Koren Shadmi
- Biersack, Andy (April 19, 2019). Ghost of Ohio. — illustrated by Scott Tuft
- Cady, Ryan (August 3, 2021). Sublime: $5 at the Door. Simon and Schuster. ISBN 978-1940878713. — illustrated by Audrey Mok, Logan Faerber, Hayden Sherman, Alex Diotto, Bill Masuku, Robert Ahmad, and Julianne Griepp
- Chisholm, Dave (November 17, 2020). Chasin' the Bird: A Charlie Parker Graphic Novel. Simon and Schuster. ISBN 978-1940878386. — deluxe edition packaged with vinyl recordings of two previously unreleased Parker tracks
- Cooper, John (September 3, 2019). Eden: A Skillet Graphic Novel. ISBN 978-1940878294. — illustrated by Chris Hunt
- Cooper, John; O'Sullivan, Ryan (September 29, 2020). Eden II: The Aftermath. Z2 Comics. ISBN 978-1940878430. — illustrated by Chris Hunt
- Coxon, Graham; Mullane, Hellen; Pakanadel, Alex (March 22, 2022). Superstate. Simon and Schuster. ISBN 978-1940878553. — 15 stories featuring the work of 15 artists accompanied by an original album soundtrack of 15 new songs from Graham Coxon
- Gorillaz (December 22, 2020). Gorillaz Almanac. Simon and Schuster. ISBN 978-1940878423.
- Hoseley, Rantz, ed. (December 6, 2022). Tori Amos: Little Earthquakes, The Graphic Album. Z2 Comics. ISBN 978-1954928619. — 24 stories inspired by the 12 songs on the album, as well as the 12 B-sides that accompanied the album and its associated singles; contributors include Tori Amos, Neil Gaiman, Margaret Atwood, Marc Andreyko, Annie Zaleski, Derek McCulloch, Leah Moore, Kelly Sue DeConnick, Neil Kleid, Lar DeSouza, Colleen Doran, and David W. Mack
- Kahn, Ben (March 2022). Jefferson Starship: Blows Against the Empire. ISBN 9781940878843. — illustrated by G. Romero-Johnson; deluxe and super deluxe editions include a limited edition Blows Against The Empire LP on colored vinyl.
- Kelly, Machine Gun; Rahal, Eliot; Cady, Ryan (September 28, 2021). Machine Gun Kelly's Hotel Diablo. Simon and Schuster. ISBN 978-1940878508. — illustrated by Martin Morazzo, Victor Ibañez, Nelson Blake II, Amilcar Pinna, Rachel Smart, and Roberta Ingranata
- Kindlon, Patrick (January 1, 2021). Run the Dungeon. Z2 Comics. ISBN 978-1954928671. — collaboration with Self Defense Family, illustrated by Goran Gligovic
- Marraffino, Frank; Snider, Dee (2023). He's Not Gonna Take It. ISBN 9798886560305. — illustrated by Steve Kurth
- Miskiewicz, Chris (July 2020). Grateful Dead Origins. ISBN 978-1940878300. — art by Noah Van Sciver
- Miskiewicz, Chris (April 6, 2021). This is Where We Fall. ISBN 978-1940878515. — sci-fi western graphic novel illustrated by Vincent Kings; comes with a soundtrack by Mitski
- Miskiewicz, Chris (November 30, 2021). Elvis: The Graphic Novel. Z2 Comics. ISBN 978-1940878652. — illustrated by Michael Shelfer
- Moore, Leah, ed. (May 4, 2021). The Doors: Morrison Hotel. Z2 Comics. ISBN 978-1940878362.
- Moore, Leah, ed. (July 5, 2022). Joan Jett & The Blackhearts 40x40: Bad Reputation / I Love Rock-n-Roll. Z2 Comics. ISBN 978-1940878546. — celebrating the 40th anniversaries of Joan Jett's first two albums, Bad Reputation and I Love Rock & Roll, bringing Jett's "songs to life as 20 vivid stories" by female writers and artists
- Oakenfold, Paul (December 19, 2017). The Wonderful World of Perfecto: With Paul Oakenfold and Friends. Z2 Comics. ISBN 978-1940878164. — artwork by Chris Hunt, Tyler Boss, Ian McGinty, and Koren Shadmi
- O'Sullivan, Ryan (October 29, 2019). Yungblud Presents the Twisted Tales of the Ritalin Club. Z2 Comics. ISBN 978-1940878317. — illustrated by Jen Hickman, Goran Gligovic, Ian McGinty, and Derek Jones
- O'Sullivan, Ryan (December 8, 2020). Yungblud Presents: The Twisted Tales of the Ritalin Club 2: Weird Times At Quarry Banks University. Z2 Comics. ISBN 978-1940878478. — illustrated by MinoMiyabi and Derek Jones
- Palmiotti, Jimmy; Conner, Amanda (30 August 2022). Blondie: Against the Odds. Z2 Comics. ISBN 978-1940878768.— contributors include Howard A. Rodman, David Barnett, Richard Kadrey, and J. H. Williams III
- Poppy; Sinclair, Titanic; Cady, Ryan (Oct 7, 2019). Genesis 1. Z2 Comics. ISBN 978-1940878287. — art by Masa Minoura and Ian McGinty; bundled with Poppy's I C U: Music to Read To, an ambient music album meant to be listened to while reading
- Prophet of the Fox God, The (October 30, 2018). Apocrypha: The Legend Of BABYMETAL. Z2 Comics. ISBN 978-1940878218. — illustrated by GMB Chomichuk
- Sattler, Ian, ed. (2021). Anthrax: Among the Living. Simon and Schuster. ISBN 978-1-9408-7859-1. — celebration of Anthrax's 40th anniversary with stories inspired by songs from Among the Living; contributors include Corey Taylor, Grant Morrison, Brian Posehn, Gerard and Mikey Way, Rob Zombie, Brian Azzarello, Jimmy Palmiotti and Rick Remender
- Soria, Gabe (August 8, 2017). Murder Ballads. Z2 Comics. ISBN 978-1940878102. — illustrated by Paul Reinwand and Chris Hunt; accompanied by an original soundtrack by Dan Auerbach and Robert Finley
- Tree, Oliver (July 6, 2021). Oliver Tree vs Little Ricky: ALIEN BOYS. Simon and Schuster. ISBN 978-1940878645. — illustrated by Orpheus Collar
- Watters, Dan (July 5, 2022). Abigail. Z2 Comics. ISBN 978-1940878911. — illustrated by Damien Worm
- Yankovic, Weird Al (January 19, 2023). The Illustrated Al: The Songs of "Weird Al" Yankovic. ISBN 978-1954928640. — takes twenty of "Weird Al" Yankovic's songs and illustrates them in comic form, each by different artists. Contributors include Drew Friedman, Mike & Laura Allred, Emo Philips, Sam Viviano, Danny Hellman, Aaron Augenblick, Peter Bagge, Bill Plympton, Gideon Kendall, Michael Kupperman, Ruben Bolling, Robert Sikoryak, Fred Harper, Bob Fingerman, and Hilary Barta. Yankovic selected artists for the book based on past experience in working with the artists, but short of proofing the final work, was otherwise hands-off for various editorial choices.

== See also ==
- Rock 'N' Roll Comics
