= Hero Happy Hour =

Comic Book

Publication information
- Publisher: GeekPunk
- Genre: Superhero
- Publication date: 2002 – 2016
- No. of issues: 5

Creative team
- Created by: Dan Taylor; Chris Fason
- Written by: Dan Taylor; Lance Karutz; James Denning; Dan Wickline; Neil Kleid; James Patrick; Scott Morse; Jim Keplinger; Jeffery Stevenson; Steve Niles; Jon Hook; C. G. Kirby; Kovalic
- Artist(s): Chris Fason; Jim Mahfood; Scott Morse; Brandon "Ragnar" Johnson; Dave Crosland; Aaron Sowd; Brett Weldele; Neil Vokes; D. J. Coffman; Diego Jourdan; Ben Templesmith; John Schuler; Cal Slayton
- Letterer(s): Kathleen Marinaccio; Jason Hanley; Anthony Schiavino; Jim Keplinger
- Colorist(s): Brandon J. Carr; Michael Russell

Collected editions
- Hero Happy Hour: Heroic Edition: ISBN 0-557-18579-3

Hero Happy Hour is an American comic book co-created by writer Dan Taylor and artist Chris Fason. Like The Tick and, less satirically, Watchmen, it takes place in a universe of vaguely familiar costumed crime fighters. All stories unfold in First City at The Hideout Bar & Grill (Drink Specials For All Heroes) and usually feature genre savvy humor.

== Publication history ==
The series was originally released as Super Hero Happy Hour in 2002 but the "Super" had to be dropped over trademark concerns about the use of the term super hero, as explained by Dan Taylor:

The decision to change the title was brought upon by the fact that we received a letter from the trademark counsel to 'the two big comic book companies' claiming that they are the joint owners of the trademark 'SUPER HEROES' and variations thereof.

A Hero Happy Hour Super Special was published in 2004 and IDW Publishing released Super Deluxe Hero Happy Hour "The Lost Episode" in 2006.

== Characters ==
- The Bartender — retired superhero. Always quick with a free round if things are getting tense.
- The Guardian (AKA "Joe", "Goody Two-Shoes") - when he's not swapping arch-nemesises he's optioning his movie rights.
- Night Ranger (AKA "Nick", "Sister Christian") - he had the name before that silly hair-band and he'll be damned if he's going to change it.
- Scout (AKA "Kip") - Night Ranger's impetuous young ward.
- Psiren - it's not a boob-job but good tailoring.
- Galaxy Girl - not really a "girl" any more but she liked the alliteration and the perfect adjective for "woman" was already taken.

== Collected editions ==
Some of the series has been collected into a trade paperback:

- Hero Happy Hour: Heroic Edition (collects Hero Happy Hour #1-5, 150 pages, Lulu.com, December 2009, ISBN 0-557-18579-3)

== Awards ==
In Wizard's Best of 2003 the series was named "Concept We Wish We’d Thought Of."
