= House of Twelve =

American comic book publisher

House of Twelve is an independent anthology comic book publisher based out of the New York metro area and run by artist Cheese Hasselberger. Also known as Ho12, it sponsors a monthly comic art collective held the first Friday of every month at Jack Demsey's Pub on 33rd Street in New York City, New York. They have been running since August 2001.

== Origin ==
House of Twelve was formed by Cheese Hasselberger, Chris Prynoski, Goat Reinecker and Jody Scheaffer in the fall of 2000. The four had been a part of a loose art collective at The School of Visual Arts in the early 1990s. After working for years on various projects, most notably Downtown (an animated series on MTV), they came together once more to do the first issue of the comic.

On the House of Twelve website, Cheese describes the origins of the group:

Way back in the early '90s me (Cheese) and some college buddies had a loosely knit art collective that helped each other out on various school assignments. We called ourselves the House of Twelve (there were 12 of us then). Years later, some of us regrouped to do the first issue of the comic, the name stuck. Since then the group has evolved and grown to the beast she is today. Sometimes there are less then [sic] 12, often more.

== Publications ==
=== House of Twelve #1 ===
Ho12 #1 Cover, Art by Chris Prynoski

House of Twelve #1 contains four stories featuring characters trying to get to the much heralded House of Twelve, a thinly veiled metaphor for heaven. The four stories were mostly experiments in violent masturbation jokes.

Ho12 #1 was scheduled to debut at the Small Press Expo of 2001, but the event was canceled on account of the September 11th, 2001 attacks only three days prior. The release was delayed until SPX 2002 where it was released to little fanfare.

=== Mauled! #1 ===
Mauled!#1, Art by Danny Hellman

Mauled! #1 is an anthology comic book with each story being a fictionalized account of actual animal attacks at zoos.

Manual Comics publisher Brian Musikoff and Cheese Hasselberger had been friends for years when Brian approached Hasselberger about publishing Mauled!. They eventually decided on co-publishing the book to make use of Brian's research and Cheese's artist contacts.

=== House of Twelve #2 ===
Ho12 #2, Art by Jody Scheaffer and Cheese Hasselberger

House of Twelve Ver. 2.0 was a relaunch of the book. Featuring an extended line-up of artists and a more mainstream theme, science fiction, the book came out to varied reviews and decent sales. It debuted at the Small Press Expo in the fall of 2003. The book featured the work of House of Twelve staple artists such as Brian Musikoff, Miss Lasko-Gross, Kevin Colden, Dave McKenna, Jenny Gonzalez and Evan Forsch as well as many others.

=== House of Twelve #3 ===
Ho12#3, Art by Miss Lasko-Gross

'House of Twelve #3's theme is obscenity. It is over 100 pages and contains stories ranging from divine masturbation to child abuse. Created as a knee jerk reaction to the gentrification of American media, its over the top content garnered excellent reviews. Along with the regular contributors it also features the work of David Paleo, Victor Cayro (credited as The Beard), Jay Marcy, Nick Jeffrey and Ryan Snook.

The book debuted at the Small Press Expo in 2004. Initial sales were greater than expected, so much so it got the attention of Diamond Comic Distribution and in January 2005 was distributed nationally. Sales slumped after the launch, placing the future of Ho12 in jeopardy.

=== House of Twelve #4 ===
After a three-year hiatus, Ho12's flagship title returned with the 68 page House of Twelve Goes to War. It features many of the same contributors along with fan favorites Mike Dawson and Chris Radtke. It was released at the 2007 Small Press Expo.

=== House of Twelve #5: Touching Children's Stories ===
The next issue was published in 2009 as an all ages comic, a series first. Contributors include: Kevin Colden, Miss Lasko-Gross, Jenny Gonzalez-Blitz, K. Thor Jensen, Dave McKenna, Kate Lacour, FuFu Frauenwhal, Chris Garrison, Frank Reynoso, Evan Forsch, Darryl Ayo, Cheese Hasselberger, Nick Jeffrey, Hugo, Brian Musikoff& Rodá.

=== House of Twelve Presents ===
Ho12 Presents is a series of movie parody comics produced annually. A variation of the 24-hour comic concept, the books are created in an afternoon (usually over Memorial Day Weekend) by the collective during the Ho12 Barbecue. The artists are broken up into four randomly generated teams and work together to create separate four-page stories, a connecting story is then created to string the stories together. They are then published as mini-comics and given away as promotional books at conventions and appearances.

==== Rashomon ====
The first of the Ho12 mini's, is based on the classic Japanese story "Rashomon". Its resemblance is fairly loose, keeping the basic story of three people going into the woods and only two coming out, a trial, and it leaves the reader wondering what actually happened. For consistency the characters were culled from images found on The Live Journal Random Image Generator, an internet script that pulls the last 30 images posted on Livejournal.com. It also introduces the character of Billy Kramer, a long-haired, heavy metal guitar player who has become an unofficial mascot of sorts. The book was nominated for an Ignatz Award for best debut comic at the 2005 Small Press Expo.

==== Heavy Metal ====
A parody of the 1980s animated feature Heavy Metal (originally based on the comic art magazine of the same name), the mini comic is a sequel to the movie featuring the return of the Loc-Nar and it again telling tales of its corruptive powers. The book again featured four stories and a surrounding story, but the characters were created extemporaneously instead of based on real people. It was again nominated for an Ignatz Award for the best debut comic at the 2006 Small Press Expo.

==== The Breakfast Club ====
Another parody of a 1980s classic film, The Breakfast Club. The book tells the stories of why the characters were sent to the detention that the movie is based around. It was created on May 28, 2007, and was scheduled for release in autumn 2007.

=== House of Twelve Monthly digital comics ===
In the spring of 2010 House of Twelve began releasing digital comics for Comixology's Comics app for iPods, iPhones and (eventually) iPads. Despite the title, the book came out quarterly the first year. The first issue features Miss Lasko-Gross, Sam Henderson, K. Thor Jensen and Darryl Ayo. The second issue was slated to have underground cartoonist Bald Eagles (a.k.a. Victor Cayro). Apple censored the comics, forcing the publisher to reformat the book, the final issue featured comics by: Dave McKenna, Kate lacour, Fred Noland, David Paleo and Cheese Hasselberger. The third issue was released in December 2010 with more stories by Miss Lasko-Gross, Sam Henderson, Darryl Ayo and Xeric winner Nick Jeffrey.

== The Ho12 Comic Jams ==
Started in August 2001 as an excuse to meet new people after a bad break up, Cheese Hasselberger drunkenly posted on The Comics Journal message boards about starting a cartooning group. A date was set and a bunch of cartoonists got together at the New York bar Max Fish. It was decided at the meeting that the group become a regular gathering. While at the bar founding member K. Thor Jensen said, "We need a name, some kind of art movement!" and Cheese replied, "More like a bowel movement." and the Bowery Bowel Movement Jams were born.

They stayed at that location meeting the first Wednesday night of every month through 2002 and early 2003. Eventually they outgrew Max Fish and moved the event to McCarthy's Bar and Grill on Second Avenue because it offered more space and a private room. They also changed the name to the Ho12 Comic Jams seeing they were no longer in The Bowery (which was something of a misnomer itself but had been retained due to its aura of chic). The group stayed there until it closed its doors in April 2007 when they resettled at Jack Demsey's Pub, which also offers a private room and a more accessible location.

The format of the comics created has stayed the same since its inception. Each participant brings a sketchbook or note pad and draws a starting panel then passes the book to who ever is available to continue the story. Each story goes on until the either it reaches a logical conclusion or runs out of steam. All are welcome and the group has grown and shrunk over the years, from a lowest attendance of five to a peak of 24 attendees. Currently they average twelve to fifteen attendees a month.

The Ho12 Comic Jams still take place the first Friday of every month starting at 7 pm and running until at least 11 pm, often later.
