= Keyhole (comics) =

Comic book series

- Keyhole #1, art by Dean Haspiel.

Publication information
- Publisher: Millennium Publications, Top Shelf Productions
- Schedule: irregular
- Format: Ongoing series
- Genre: Alternative comics
- Publication date: June 1996–December 1998; Fall 2021
- No. of issues: 7
- Main character(s): Josh & Sari; Billy Dogma; Titans of Finance; Lionel

Creative team
- Created by: Dean Haspiel and Josh Neufeld

Keyhole is a black-and-white alternative comic book published from 1996 to 1998. A two-man anthology by cartoonists Dean Haspiel and Josh Neufeld, Keyhole was published by two different publishers, starting with Millennium Publications and ending up at Top Shelf Productions. In 2021, Haspiel and Neufeld released a 25th-anniversary issue of Keyhole, with new material from both creators.

== Publication history ==
Keyhole began as a self-published mini-comic by the long-time friends Haspiel and Neufeld. Keyhole Mini-Comics ran for four issues in 1995. Reviewed in Factsheet Five, Comics Buyer's Guide, and elsewhere, it was then picked up by Millennium, which published the first full-sized issue in June 1996. With its fourth issue, Keyhole was released under Millennium's new imprint, Modern Comics. Top Shelf picked up the comic for its fifth and sixth issues.

In 2002, Haspiel, Neufeld, and Alternative Comics announced plans to publish Keyhole vol. II, but the comic never appeared, and the two cartoonists moved on to other projects.

In the fall of 2021, Haspiel and Neufeld self-published a seventh issue of Keyhole ("Keyhole 25"), a 36-page full-color flip comic with new material from both creators, as well as a center-spread article about the history of the comic, written by Whitney Matheson.

== Form and content ==
Equally inspired by Harvey Pekar's American Splendor and Los Bros Hernandez' Love and Rockets, a typical issue of Keyhole featured an autobiographical travel story by Neufeld, a Billy Dogma story by Haspiel, and short recurring features such as R. Walker and Neufeld's "Titans of Finance", Neufeld's one-page "Travel Tips" and the Haspiel/Neufeld collaborative feature "Lionel's Lament". Other stories appearing in Keyhole included short autobiographical pieces by Haspiel, and assorted collaborations with other writers (including one memorable piece with The Duplex Planet's David Greenberger).

== Reception and legacy ==
Wizard magazine characterized Keyhole as featuring "such a wide range of short stories, from travel strips based on Neufeld's journey through Asia to Haspiel’s wonky superhero 'Billy Dogma,' that every issue feels like an anthology," finishing its review with the assessment, "Haspiel’s stylized black-find-while art contrasts nicely with Neufeld’s earthy cartooning to make for a consistently good-looking comic." Similarly, The Comics Journal reviewed Keyhole this way: "Brought together in a single, independent magazine, these artists' strong, disparate talents create a broad reading experience, and a blending of artistic intentions and personal expression like very few others available today in American comix".

Although Keyhole originally only ran six issues, it was a critically acclaimed project that proved to be a launching pad for both Haspiel and Neufeld's careers. Haspiel debuted his existential antihero, Billy Dogma, in Keyhole, a character whose adventures have since been published by Modern Comics, Top Shelf, Alternative Comics, Z2 Comics, and Image Comics. In addition, Haspiel collected many of the autobiographical stories from Keyhole in Opposable Thumbs (2001), published by Alternative Comics, and used those stories as a jumping-off point for the Street Code stories he later told on DC Comics' webcomics imprint Zuda Comics. Neufeld, in turn, collected the "Titans of Finance" stories in a self-titled comic published by Alternative in 2001. In 2004, he collected his Keyhole travel stories (as well as subsequent ones) in the Xeric Award-winning graphic novel A Few Perfect Hours.

In addition, both cartoonists became regular illustrators for Harvey Pekar and his American Splendor projects.
