= Cuba: My Revolution =

Graphic novel written by Inverna Lockpez

- Cover to graphic novel
- Date: September 2010
- Page count: 144 pages
- Publisher: Vertigo

Creative team
- Writers: Inverna Lockpez
- Artists: Dean Haspiel
- Colourists: Jose Villarubia

Original publication
- Published in: September 14, 2010
- ISBN: 1-4012-1097-X

Cuba: My Revolution is a semiautobiographical graphic novel written by Inverna Lockpez with art by Dean Haspiel and colours by Jose Villarubia. It was published by DC Comics imprint Vertigo.

== Plot ==
The story is set in Cuba in 1959, when 17-year old medical student Sonya dreams of becoming a painter. Encouraged by the ideals of the Cuban Revolution she joins the militia and is sent to the Bay of Pigs, where she's imprisoned and tortured by her own comrades. She returns home, but discovers her opinions are not in line with Fidel Castro's regime.

== Reception ==
Cuba: My Revolution was covered by, among others, NPR's Tell Me More, the New York Post, and Graphic Novel Reporter.
