= Dan Taylor (writer) =

- Born: December 19, 1967 (age 58) Orange, California
- Areas: Writer, Editor, Publisher, Letterer
- Notable works: Hero Happy Hour; Armarauders: The Last Battalion; Donald of the Dead

Dan Taylor (born December 19, 1967, in Orange, California) is a published writer, editor, and independent publisher.

== Early life ==
Dan Taylor was born in Orange, California. He attended Huntington Beach High School. He studied Radio/Television/Film at California State University, Long Beach.

== Career ==
Dan Taylor began writing and creating comic books in 2001 with the independently published Super Hero Happy Hour through his own publishing company GeekPunk. The parody superhero comic spawned three additional issues, as well as a collected trade paperback, and an anthology, before dropping the "Super" from the title due to a trademark concerns with the term "super hero." Taylor and Hero Happy Hour co-creator Chris Fason have also published the all-color graphic novel Hero Happy Hour: On The Rocks and Hero Happy Hour Vs. The Supreme Leader.

In April 2005, Taylor joined IDW Publishing as editor to work on The Transformers (IDW Publishing), as well as other IDW published titles. He left IDW in 2008 to pursue more writing.

== Personal life ==
Dan Taylor resides in Costa Mesa, California, with his wife Katie West-Taylor, daughter Jean Louise Taylor, dogs Scioscia and Scully, and cat Quint.

== Bibliography ==
- Super Hero Happy Hour #1 (writer/co-creator, with art by Chris Fason, GeekPunk, December 2002)
- Super Hero Happy Hour #2 (writer/letterer/co-creator, with art by Chris Fason, GeekPunk, March 2003)
- Super Hero Happy Hour #3 (writer/letterer/co-creator, with art by Chris Fason, GeekPunk, June 2003)
- Super Hero Happy Hour #4 (writer/letterer/co-creator, with art by Chris Fason, GeekPunk, September 2003)
- Super Hero Happy Hour: Volume 1 (TPB) (writer/letterer/co-creator, with art by Chris Fason, GeekPunk, December 2003)
