= Goosebumps HorrorLand (video game) =

- The universal artwork for Goosebumps HorrorLand
- Developer: Gusto Games
- Publisher: Elastic
- Composer: Nathan McCree
- Series: Goosebumps
- Platforms: Nintendo DS, PlayStation 2, Wii
- Release: NA: 28 October 2008; EU: 16 October 2009
- Genre: Adventure
- Modes: Single-player, multiplayer

Goosebumps HorrorLand is a 2008 horror-themed adventure game based on R. L. Stine's series of novellas with the same name, and inspired by the 1994 novella One Day at HorrorLand. The game follows a child who is invited to HorrorLand, a horror-themed amusement park, who has to escape by visiting all the park's attractions and finding all the missing pieces to their ticket. The game also features various references to the Goosebumps series through its minigames and collectible items. Published by Scholastic the game was released on the Nintendo DS, PlayStation 2, and Wii on 28 October 2008 in the United States, and 16 October 2009 in Europe.

The game was created to be a visual tie-in to the Goosebumps HorrorLand horror novella series for children, a spin-off series to the original Goosebumps books. Upon release, Goosebumps HorrorLand received mixed reviews from critics, and generally negative reviews for the Nintendo Wii release of the game. The Nintendo DS and PlayStation 2 versions were met with more positive reviews, with praise towards its concept, dark humor, storyline, and addictive minigames overall, but criticism towards the camera angles, muffled sounds, and outdated mechanics.

== Gameplay ==
The player controls a child character who wanders the park of HorrorLand after receiving an invitation. To progress onwards to other areas of the park, the player must ride and score a certain amount of points on the park attractions, referred to as "Frights." Each minigame has a threshold of points that need to be earned in order to gain the lowest-tier of Frights, the lowest being Bronze, and the highest being Gold. There are a total of 30 minigames across the HorrorLand theme park, which include rides similar to bumper cars, mini golf, and roller coasters. Once a minigame is successfully completed, the player can re-play the minigame on the main menu.

The game features an open-world amusement park, where the player can talk to characters and earn rewards, interact with HorrorLand employees, and talk to attendants in order to ride an attraction. When the players interact with GiGi, the players also have the option to sneak up on Horrors and "pinch" them, which causes the creatures to deflate. HorrorLand also has five areas, each named based on its own theme: Carnival of Screams, Vampire Village, Fever Swamp, Mad Labs, and Terror Tombs.

== Plot ==
The game opens with a child who has been invited to HorrorLand under mysterious circumstances, alongside their friend Nate. Once they arrive at the park, they become aware that they are trapped and cannot escape unless they progress through the entirety of HorrorLand. It is revealed by the park owner Horrifico that a creature known as the "Great Gargantua" has escaped and is loose in the park, and warns the player of the creature. The player, after having ridden the Roller Ghoster in Vampire Village, meets a young girl name GiGi, who reveals that she can locate the player's missing ticket pieces that will let them leave the park. After Horrifico reveals that he will not let the child leave the park, the player, GiGi, and Nate break for an escape on the final ride, where it is revealed that GiGi was the Great Gargantua the whole time, in a human disguise. She thanks the player for freeing her, claiming that she will now make the whole world her personalized "own HorrorLand."

== Development ==
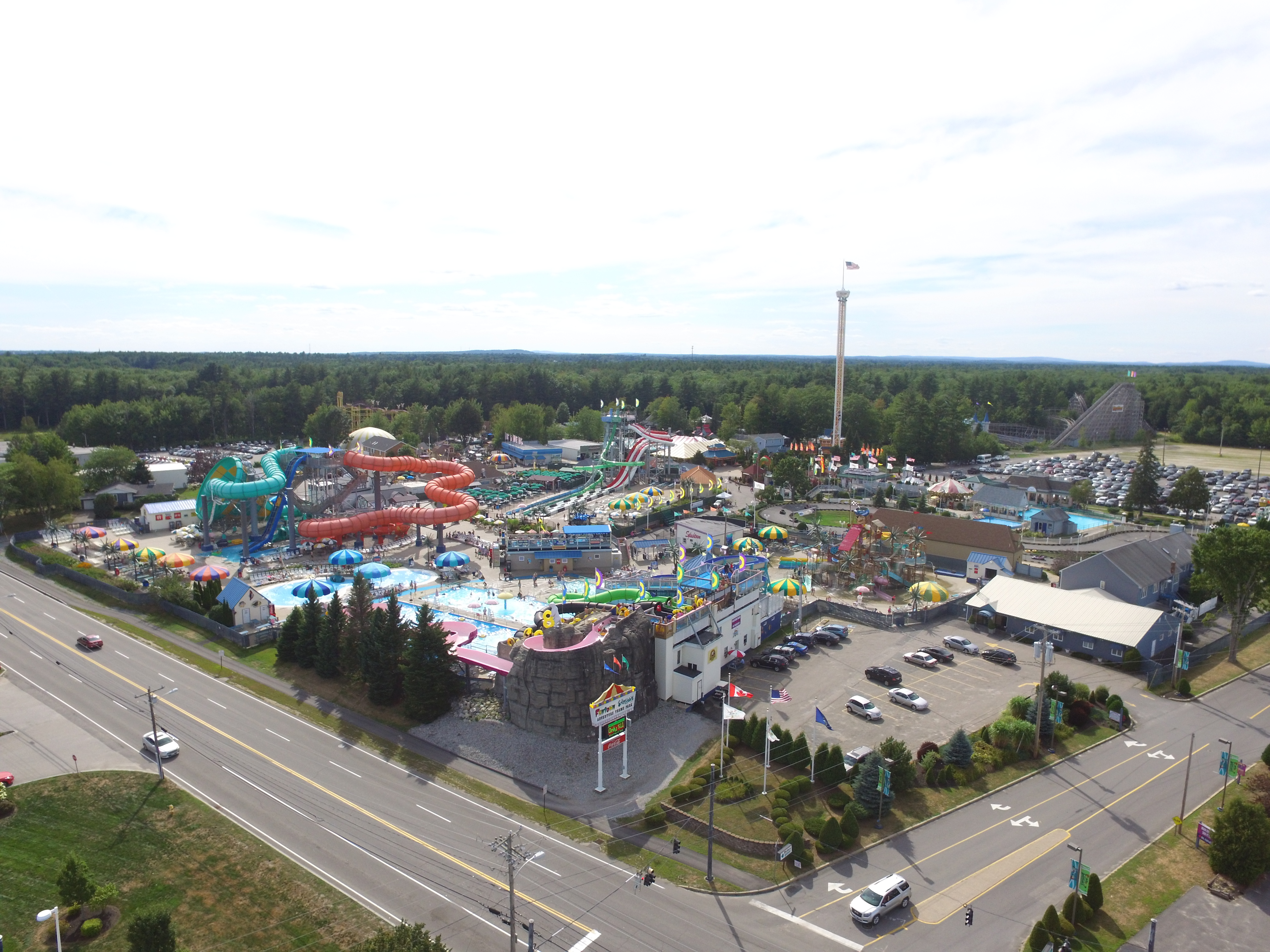
Amusement parks were the inspirations behind Goosebumps HorrorLand (Funtown Splashtown USA - pictured)

Goosebumps HorrorLand was developed to be a tie-in with R. L. Stine's revived Goosebumps series, sharing the same name with the video game. Unlike previous books in the series, each novella in the HorrorLand sub-series takes place in primarily the same location, with several of its releases crossing over events from the previous books. Much like the books, the Goosebumps HorrorLand video game features several references to past Goosebumps books, with some of the park attractions being named after them.

Goosebumps HorrorLand is primarily inspired by the 1994 children's book from the original Goosebumps series, One Day at HorrorLand. The game utilizes the concepts from the original novella, including the location of HorrorLand, the creatures known as "Horrors," and some of the park's attractions mentioned in the book. The concept of dressing as Horrors, which was utilized midway through the main game's storyline, first appeared in Stine's 1999 novel, Return to HorrorLand. The location of HorrorLand is primarily inspired by American amusement parks, with Goosebumps HorrorLand featuring several bumper car, mini golf, roller coaster, water ride, and arcade game-styled attractions based on these locations.

=== Release ===
Goosebumps HorrorLand was announced in the summer of 2008, and was released on 28 October of that same year for the Nintendo DS, Wii, and PlayStation 2 in the United States. European versions of the game were delayed, and released the following year on 16 October 2009.

== Reception ==
Reception

Aggregate score
Aggregator	Score
Metacritic	Wii: 37/100; DS: 68/100

Review scores
Publication	Score
GameSpot	Wii: 3.5/10
Nintendo Life	Wii: 3/10

Goosebumps HorrorLand was met with mixed reviews on the Nintendo DS and PlayStation 2 releases, and generally negative reviews on the Wii. The game holds a 37% for the Wii version, and a 68% for the DS release, according to review aggregator Metacritic.

The Wii version of Goosebumps HorrorLand was panned by video game journalists. Carolyn Petit for GameSpot praised the atmosphere and aesthetics of the game, but heavily criticized the golf-themed minigames, camera angles, and mechanics—stating that the controls were broken for most of the minigames. Zach Kaplan for Nintendo Life also criticized the Wii version of the game, writing: "Despite a few fun excursions, the scariest thing about HorrorLand is its overwhelming mediocrity. It's a carnival-themed mini-game collection dressed up in a Halloween costume, and while its rare story elements and sense of humour amusingly echo the tone of the book series, its frequent control and camera issues add up to an experience that makes the taunts of the resident Horrors that 'you'll never leave' all the more frightening." In a more positive retrospective review, Nicholas Owen for GameRant called Goosebumps HorrorLand a "spooky" and "nice adaptation" of Goosebumps, writing: "Goosebumps: Horrorland is a peculiar entry in the series, mainly because it's the only non-adventure game in the franchise. This is a minigame collection set in the HorrorLand theme park, which has served as a location for many Goosebumps books. While the minigames themselves are average at best, the fact that the game allows players to freely roam around HorrorLand is enough to make this a must-play for every Goosebumps fan."

Chris Meyer for Game Vortex gave a positive review for the Nintendo DS version of the game, scoring it a 70%, stating that "The graphics alone might turn away many players, but those who enjoy a variety of games in one package should find amusement in this theme park-themed game. As for needing to be a Goosebumps fan, that is definitely not the case. While fans will get a little extra out of it (especially those who are fans of the Goosebumps: HorrorLand books), it isn't required reading."

== Legacy ==
The PlayStation 2 version of Goosebumps HorrorLand, which was bundled with the 1996 Goosebumps book Calling All Creeps, has become a collectible among video game enthusiasts. According to a 2019 report, used copies were valued at more than US$250, while sealed copies could command prices of approximately US$600.
