= Jarrett Williams =

American comic book creator

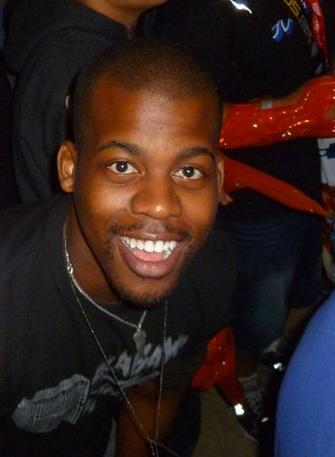
- Williams in 2012
- Occupation: Comic book artist
- Years active: 2003–present
- Known for: Super Pro K.O.! Rick and Morty: Worlds Apart
- Website: http://superproko.com

Jarrett Brandon Williams is an American comic book creator. Williams currently wrote and illustrated the Super Pro K.O.! graphic novel series through comic publisher Oni Press, later co-illustrating the 2021 graphic novel Rick and Morty: Worlds Apart with Tony Fleecs.

== Early life and education ==
Williams was raised in New Orleans, Louisiana. His first exposure to comics came from The Times-Picayune newspaper comic strip section. As a child, Williams was fairly introverted and loved drawing, reading, Legos, and playing video games. He frequented the Crescent City Comic Shop in New Orleans where he was first exposed to comics.

Williams attended the New Orleans Center for Creative Arts where he graduated in the school's Visual Arts Program. In 2002, he enrolled into the Savannah College of Art and Design where he received his Bachelor of Fine Arts in Sequential Art in 2006 and his Master of Fine Arts in Sequential Art in 2010.

== Career ==
Williams worked primarily on his first web-comic, Lunar Boy Land, while in college from 2003 to 2007. He updated the comic every Monday and Wednesday. He eventually collected Lunar Boy into two graphic novel collections.

Super Pro K.O.!

In 2008, Williams stopped working on Lunar Boy, in order to develop a pro-wrestling comic called Super Pro K.O.!. A pro-wrestling fan from childhood, the comic was a way to challenge if he could draw anything besides Lunar Boy and all-ages types of stories. He wanted to develop a comic devoted to pro-wrestling that also drew upon his own experiences in the comic industry. S.P.K.O. was originally planned to be a web-comic but Williams began to stretch out the concept even further into a graphic novel series. Williams began bringing mini-comics of Super Pro K.O.! to comic conventions on the east and west coasts throughout 2008 and 2009 which eventually got into the hands of Oni Press editors. With Tony Fleecs, Williams co-illustrated all five issues of the Rick and Morty limited series Rick and Morty: Worlds Apart, written by Josh Trujillo and published from February to May 2021.

== Style and influences ==
Williams' style is a hybrid of classic American-based comic storytelling and manga which influenced him during his teenage years.

Williams was hugely influenced by comic books such as Teenage Mutant Ninja Turtles. Williams also sites numerous newspaper comic strips such as Curtis, Peanuts, and Calvin and Hobbes as influences. Manga such as Ranma ½, Sailor Moon, and Dragon Ball also influenced him. Williams also draws inspiration from numerous video games.

== Published works ==
Graphic novels

- Super Pro K.O.! volume 1 (August 2010)
- Super Pro K.O.! volume 2: Chaos in the Cage! (November 2011)
- Super Pro K.O.! volume 3: Gold for Glory! (2013)
- Williams, Jarrett (2017). Hyperforce Neo. Z2 Comics. p. 144. ISBN 9781940878126.
- Rick and Morty: Worlds Apart (February–May 2021; illustrator, with Tony Fleecs)

Anthologies

- Yo Gabba Gabba Comic Book Time (vol. 1) (8 page pencils, inks, and letters for a story called "FIND" written by Frank Pittarese and colored by Rico Renzi)
- Yo Gabba Gabba Free Comic Book Time (Free Comic Book Day 2012)

Self Published

- The Lunar Boy vol. 1
- The Lunar Boy vol. 2
