= Koren Shadmi =

Israeli-American illustrator and cartoonist

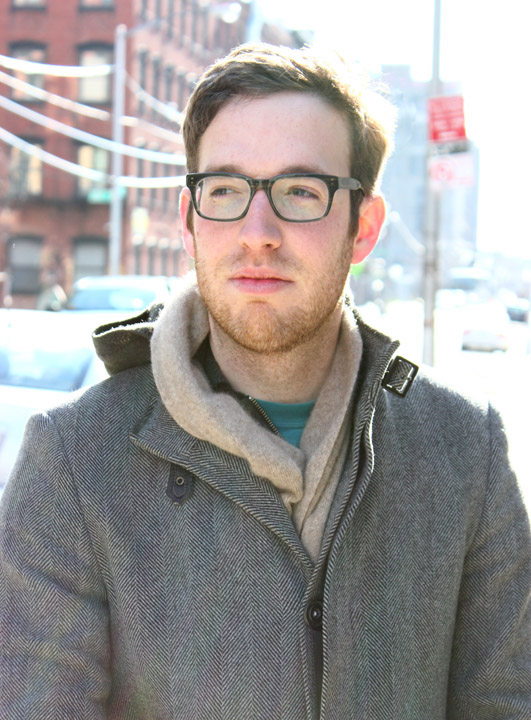
- Born: February 22, 1981 (age 45)
- Education: School Of Visual Arts
- Notable work: Highwayman, Bionic, The Twilight Man: Rod Serling and The Birth Of Television

Koren Shadmi (Born 1981) an Illustrator and Cartoonist known for his surreal, psychological and highly stylized editorial work, which often highlights the absurdities and contradictions of modern life. Beyond his editorial work, Shadmi is an acclaimed graphic novelist, specializing in two distinct mediums: Non-fiction biographies and Science fiction.

== Career ==
In 1998, at age 17, Shadmi released his first graphic novel, Profile 107, a collaboration with mentor cartoonist Uri Fink. In 2002 Shadmi began his studies in School of Visual Arts, where he now teaches illustration.

Shadmi's first english book, In The Flesh, - a collection of comics dealing with relationships - was published by Random House in 2009. His short story "Antoinette" was selected for the Best American Comics 2009 anthology edited by Charles Burns.

His following book, The Abaddon, was loosely based on Jean-Paul Sartre’s existential play No Exit. The Abaddon was published in book form by Z2 Comics in 2015 to critical acclaim.

In 2015 Shadmi illustrated the book Mike's Place: A True Story of Love, Blues, and Terror in Tel Aviv published by First Second Books.

In 2016, Shadmi’s semi-autobiographical comic Love Addict: Confessions of a Serial Dater was published by Top Shelf. The book deals with the perils of online dating.

In 2017 Shadmi began collaborating with author David Kushner. Their first book was Rise of the Dungeon Master, a graphic novel based on a Wired (magazine) article written by the award-winning Kushner, profiling Gary Gygax, the founder of the tabletop role-playing game Dungeons & Dragons. Kushner and Shadmi collaborated again in 2020 on A for Anonymous which tracks the origins of the hacktivist group. And once more in 2022 on Easy to Learn, Difficult to Master chronicling the stories of Ralph H. Baer and Nolan Bushnell and their groundbreaking work during the early days of video games.

In 2019 Shadmi wrote and drew The Twilight Man: Rod Serling and the Birth of Television published by Humanoids. The book visualizes the life story of TV maverick Rod Serling. The book garnered positive reviews including features in The New York Review of Books and The Hollywood Reporter.

In 2021 Humanoids released a follow-up book by Shadmi about the horror legend Bela Lugosi - Lugosi: The Rise and Fall of Hollywood's Dracula - which won the Rondo Hatton Classic Horror Award for Best Graphic Novel, and was nominated for the Eisner Awards in 2022. Shadmi's next book with Humanoids - 'All Tomorrow's Parties: The Velvet Underground Story' was a graphic biography of The Velvet Underground. The book, which came out in 2023, focused on the tumultuous relationship between the band's founding members - Lou Reed and John Cale.

Shadmi's illustration clients include: The New York Times, The Wall Street Journal, Mother Jones, Playboy, BusinessWeek, The Village Voice, The Washington Post, The Boston Globe, Wired, Spin, ESPN the Magazine, Popular Mechanics, Random House, W.W Norton, The New Yorker, and many others.

== Personal life ==
Shadmi currently lives and works in Queens, New York.

== Awards ==
- Albert Dorne Award, Society of Illustrators (2006)
- Gran Guinigi Award, Lucca Comics and Games Festival, Italy (2008)
- "Antoinette" (short story) was selected for the anthology Best American Comics 2009, edited by Charles Burns (2009)
- Gold Medal in the 'Uncommissioned' category, Society of Illustrators (2011)
- National Endowment Of The Arts 'Our Town' Grant with Ideas X Lab (2015)
- Rudolph Dirks Award in the 'Mature/Erotic' category, German Comic Con (2016)
- Ignatz Award: nominated in two categories (Outstanding Artist and Outstanding Graphic Novel) for Highwayman, 2019
- Rondo Hatton Classic Horror Awards Best Graphic Novel (2022)
- Eisner Awards: Nominated 'Best Reality-Based Work' (2022)
