= Billy Dogma =

- Billy Dogma and his partner, Jane Legit.

Publication information
- Publisher: Millennium Publications / Modern Comics; Top Shelf Productions; Alternative Comics; Image Comics; IDW Publishing; Hang Dai Editions
- First appearance: The New York Hangover (1995 comic strip)
- Created by: Dean Haspiel

In-story information
- Place of origin: Trip City
- Team affiliations: Jane Legit
- Abilities: Surreal durability and regeneration; use of the Berserk Gun

Billy Dogma is a fictional comic book character created by Dean Haspiel. Described by Haspiel as "the last romantic antihero," the character debuted in 1995 and has since appeared in comic books, graphic novels, webcomics, and anthology projects published by Millennium Publications/Modern Comics, Top Shelf Productions, Alternative Comics, Z2 Comics, Image Comics, and other publishers.

An "existential superhero," Billy's adventures juxtapose high-stakes action with the character's emotional vulnerability. Haspiel has described Billy Dogma as his "umbrella character," operating as a parody of superhero tropes while infusing philosophical undertones that explore the ironies of everyday urban life, reflecting Haspiel's experiences as a New York native. Billy Dogma is generally regarded as Haspiel's signature character and a central figure of the creator's personal mythology.

== Publication history ==
Billy Dogma's original character design, featuring the costume used prior to his 2014 redesign.

Billy Dogma first appeared in 1995, in a series of comic strips published in The New York Hangover, an alternative weekly. His first true comic book appearance was in Keyhole, the two-man anthology created by Haspiel and cartoonist Josh Neufeld. Following the character's debut in Keyhole, Haspiel produced a three-issue Billy Dogma series through Millennium Publications.

In the late 1990s/early 2000s, Billy appeared in short adventures alongside other creators' characters, including Jessica Abel's Artbabe, Nick Bertozzi's Viva Muerte, Pete Sickman-Garner's Hey, Mister, and Maze's Lovely Prudence.

Additional stories appeared in a succession of '"Billy Dogma Experience" collections and graphic novels, including Daydream Lullabies (Top Shelf Productions, 1999), Boy In My Pocket (Top Shelf, 2003), and Aim To Dazzle (Alternative Comics, 2004).

In 2006, Haspiel became a founding member of the ACT-I-VATE webcomics collective, where new Billy Dogma stories such as Immortal and Fear, My Dear were serialized online. Immortal was nominated for a 2008 Eisner Award for Best Digital Comic. The storyline was collected in the two-man anthology Brawl (Image Comics, 2007). (Immortal and Fear, My Dear were both reworked and collected in the hardcover graphic novel Fear, My Dear, published by Z2 in 2014.)

The Billy Dogma story "Sex Planet," originally published in Popgun vol. 2 (2008), was adapted into a motion comic in 2010 by Haspiel and animator Daniel Kramer.

During the 2010s and 2020s, the character continued to appear in print collections and new stories, including Fear, My Dear (2014), Billy Dogma: Heart-Shaped Hole (2015), and Billy Dogma & Jane Legit (2023). Billy Dogma was also featured as a recurring component of Image Comics' Image! 30th Anniversary Anthology (2022-2023).

== Development ==
Haspiel conceived the Billy Dogma character in 1995 as a romantic antihero navigating a surreal urban landscape known as Trip City, drawing inspiration from E. C. Segar's Popeye, Frank Miller's Sin City, Ben Grimm (a.k.a. the Thing), the tough-guy persona of Golden Age actor Spencer Tracy — and as an avatar for himself.

Billy was preceded by an earlier character, Tommy Rocket, a motorcycle-riding misanthropic vigilante who appeared in Haspiel's pre-professional and early independent comics work. As Haspiel has stated,

Billy Dogma also came from a screenplay that I had written called Once and For All. I took scenes from that defunct screenplay and turned them into small comix strips. But, when all is said and done, Billy Dogma is a pumped-up version of myself, thrown into an array of impossible conflicts.

In Fear, My Dear (originally published in 2008), Haspiel substantially expanded Billy Dogma's mythology. The story reveals that Billy's father is indeed Tommy Rocket (real name Wolfgang Dogma), and that Billy forged his "Berserk Gun" from Tommy Rocket's weapons. The story also links Billy to several of Haspiel's earlier creator-owned characters, creating a shared mythology spanning works produced across more than two decades.

In Fear, My Dear, the character also underwent a significant visual redesign. In his early appearances, Billy was depicted as clean-shaven and wore a distinctive costume featuring a striped jersey with a broad collar, banded sleeves and shoulders, a chest insignia depicting a spiral within a radiating sunburst, and lace-up trousers reminiscent of early football uniforms. Beginning with Fear, My Dear, Haspiel redesigned the character with longer hair, a scruffy beard, and a frequently shirtless appearance. The redesign coincided with a shift in the series toward more mythological and symbolic storytelling.

== Characterization ==
Billy Dogma is a physically imposing but emotionally vulnerable adventurer whose turbulent relationship with Jane Legit forms the foundation of many stories. Haspiel has characterized the series as a blend of romance, fantasy, noir, and surrealism, describing Billy Dogma as a "psychedelic romance gone galactic between a dumb-luck bruiser and his knock-em-dead dame." The Washington Post describes Billy as a "tough guy with tear ducts."

Billy is noted for his particular manner of speech, and critics have frequently commented on the series' distinctive dialogue and colorful expressions — examples include "the war of woo," "Knock me some sugar," and "You don't get to love when you love like you love." Michael Cavna describes Haspiel's writing as "part hard-boiled slang, part beat poetry," while Rob Clough cites its roots in Stan Lee-style comic-book bombast.

The original incarnation of Billy carried a Berserk Gun that "shot everything but bullets," a recurring element of the series' surreal humor and mythology. Resisting consumer culture, Billy fought absurd villains such as the Human Barcode and the Undercolor Cop, all while trying to hold down a job and pay the rent on his humble apartment.

Billy's longtime romantic partner, Jane Legit, serves as both his principal companion and emotional counterweight. Jane is an anchoring force amid the chaos of Trip City; their turbulent relationship forms the central conflict of many stories.

== Powers and abilities ==
Although originally conceived as a street-level antihero, Billy Dogma possesses a variety of surreal and often inconsistent abilities. Throughout the series he demonstrates extraordinary durability, surviving injuries that would normally be fatal, including the loss of his heart and the temporary removal of his own head. He has also displayed energy-based attacks and other reality-defying abilities.

Billy's signature weapon is the Berserk Gun, a firearm said to shoot "everything but bullets." The weapon's abilities vary throughout the series and frequently reflect the surreal and symbolic nature of the stories themselves.

== Themes and mythology ==
Although Billy Dogma originated as a superhero-inspired character, the series frequently departs from conventional superhero narratives. Critics have described the work as a blend of romance, fantasy, autobiography, and superhero fiction. Reviewing Fear, My Dear, Ben Herman identified visual and thematic echoes of Jack Kirby and Steve Ditko, comparing Billy to Kirby characters such as the Thing while emphasizing the series' mixture of romance, fantasy, and cosmic imagery.

Recurring themes include romantic obsession, identity, desire, masculinity, and self-discovery. Beginning with Fear, My Dear and continuing in later works such as Heart-Shaped Hole, Haspiel expanded the mythology surrounding Billy Dogma by linking the character to earlier creations and by portraying Billy and Jane's relationship as a force capable of influencing the fate of Trip City itself.

Later Billy Dogma stories increasingly foreground sexuality and romantic desire as central themes. Works such as "Sex Planet," "Heart-Shaped Hole," "Bring Me the Heart of Billy Dogma," and "I Will Break You But I Won't Kill You Because I Need You" place greater emphasis on the physical dimensions of Billy's relationship with Jane Legit, and the blending of eroticism, romance, and surreal fantasy.

== Relationship to Haspiel's autobiographical work ==
Critics and commentators have frequently discussed Billy Dogma in relation to Dean Haspiel's autobiographical work. Although Billy Dogma stories often feature surreal situations, fantastical imagery, and superhero-inspired elements, critics have noted their recurring focus on personal relationships, emotional conflict, identity, and self-examination. As a result, the series has frequently been situated at the intersection of autobiographical comics, romance comics, and fantasy.

Billy Dogma has been used as part of Haspiel's broader practice of "semi-autobiographical" storytelling that blends personal experience with fictional invention.

== Bibliography ==
=== Stories ===
- "Situation Dichotomy," in Keyhole #1 (Millennium Publications, June 1996)
- "Billy Dogma Versus the Human Bar-Code," in Keyhole #2 (Millennium Publications, Oct. 1996)
- "Daydream Lullabies 1: Heartbreak Boulevard," in Keyhole #3 (Millennium Publications, Jan. 1997)
- "Daydream Lullabies 2: Unlawful Carnal Knowledge," in Keyhole #3 (Millennium Publications, Jan. 1997)
- "Daydream Lullabies 3: Impossible Odds," in Keyhole #3 (Millennium Publications, Jan. 1997)
- "Daydream Lullabies 4: Like We Always Do," in Keyhole #3 (Millennium Publications, Jan. 1997)
- "Daydream Lullabies 5: Perfect For Any Occasion," in Keyhole #3 (Millennium Publications, Jan. 1997)
- (with Maze) "Valentine's Day Mascara," in Keyhole #4 (Millennium Publications/Modern Comics, Aug. 1997)
- (with Jessica Abel) "Lucky Love Limbo," in SPX '97 (Small Press Expo, Sept. 1997)
- (with Nick Bertozzi) "Corner Pocket," in SPX '98 (Small Press Expo, 1998)
- (with Pete Sickman-Garner) "Billy Karma," in Hey, Mister: The Fall Collection (Top Shelf Productions, 2002)
- (with Jim Rugg) "Go Get a Late Pass!," in Street Angel #1 - The Princess of Poverty (Slave Labor Graphics, June 2005)
- Immortal (Act-i-vate, 2007) — reworked for print in Brawl #1–3 (Image Comics, 2007)
- Fear, My Dear (Act-i-vate, 2008)
- "Sex Planet," in Popgun #2 (Image Comics, July 2008)
- "Bring Me the Heart of Billy Dogma," in the ACT-I-VATE Primer anthology (IDW Publishing, 2009)
- "The Angel" (Overflow #6, 2010)
- "Wet Dreams," in Grindhouse: Drive In, Bleed Out #3 (Dark Horse Comics, March 2015)
- "I Will Break You But I Won't Kill You Because I Need You" parts 1–12, in Image! 30th Anniversary Anthology #1-12 (Image Comics, Apr. 2022-Apr. 2023)
- "Tough Crowd" (with Chest Face), Antimatter #1 (self-published, May 2026)

=== Solo tiles, collections, and graphic novels ===
- Billy Dogma #1–3 (Millennium Publications, 1997)
- Daydream Lullabies: a Billy Dogma Experience (Top Shelf Productions, 1999)
- Boy In My Pocket: The Billy Dogma Experiences (Top Shelf Productions, 2003)
- Aim To Dazzle: a Billy Dogma Experience (Alternative Comics, 2004)
- Dean Haspiel's The Last Romantic Antihero (self-published, 2012)
- Fear, My Dear: A Billy Dogma Experience. Z2 Comics. July 1, 2014. ISBN 978-1940878010.
- Billy Dogma: Heart-Shaped Hole (Hang Dai Editions, 2015)
- Billy Dogma & Jane Legit (self-published, 2023)
