= Ian McGinty =

American comic book writer (1985–2023)

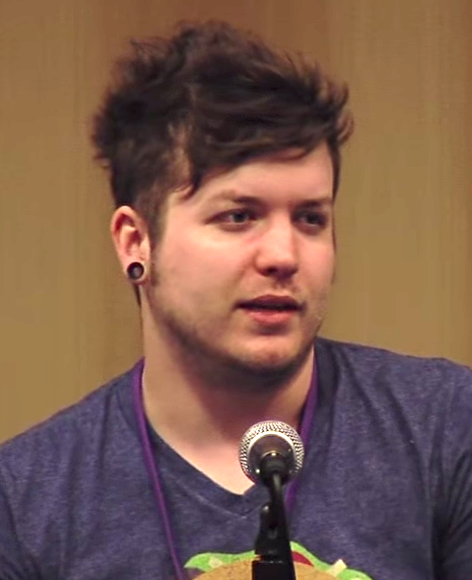
- McGinty at the 2015 Small Press Expo
- Born: Ian McGinty; May 6, 1985 Annapolis, Maryland
- Died: June 8, 2023 (aged 38) Annapolis, Maryland
- Areas: Cartoonist, Writer, Artist
- Notable works: Adventure Time; Bee and PuppyCat; Welcome to Showside

James Ian McGinty (May 6, 1985 – June 8, 2023) was an American comic book writer and artist. He was best known for his creator-owned comic Welcome to Showside, as well as for his work on Adventure Time and Bee and PuppyCat.

== Career ==
In 2015, Z2 Comics produced an animated pilot based on McGinty's creator-owned comic series Welcome to Showside.

McGinty lived in Los Angeles, California. He died on June 8, 2023, at the age of 38.

== Bibliography ==
=== Nickelodeon Studios ===
- Invader Zim #15 (W) Eric Trueheart, Danielle Koenig, KC Green, Ian McGinty, Jamie Smart (A) Warren Wucinich, KC Green, Ian McGinty with Fred C. Stresing and Meg Casey.

=== Boom! Studios ===
- Adventure Time #54, Story by Christopher Hastings. Art by Ian McGinty. Colors by Maarta Laiho. Letters by Steve Wands. Cover by Jackie Forrentino, Veronica Fish.
- Adventure Time: Candy Capers by Yuko Ota, Ananth Panagariya, Ian McGinty (Illustrations)
- Bee and Puppycat #3, created with Madeleine Flores, Ian McGinty, Anissa Espinosa, and Tait Howard.
- Munchkin #3 Writer(s): Tom Siddell, Jim Zub Artist(s): Ian McGinty
- Bravest Warriors #21-36 By Kate Leth & Ian McGinty

=== Other publishers ===
- Welcome to Showside (Z2 Comics, 2015–2016) — story and art by McGinty
