= Dan Wickline =

American novelist

- Born: April 29, 1970 (age 56) Norwalk, California
- Areas: Writer, photographer
- Notable works: 30 Days of Night: Dead Space; 30 Days of Night: Spreading the Disease

Dan Wickline (born April 29, 1970 in Norwalk, California) is a published writer and photographer.

== Early life ==
Dan Wickline was born in Norwalk, California.

== Career ==
He has written for Image Comics, IDW Publishing, Humanoids Publishing, Zenescope Entertainment, Avatar Press, Cellar Door Publishing and Moonstone Books.

His photography was collected in 2005 by Goliath Books/ Mix-of-pics and published under the title Private Skin. His current writing work includes 1001 Arabian Nights: The Adventures of Sinbad and Grimm Fairy Tales for Zenescope, and a prose piece for an upcoming “Avenger” novel for Moonstone.

== Personal life ==
Wickline resides in Los Angeles.

== Bibliography ==
- Creepers (writer/colors/letters, with art by Jeff Crumpler, Hardline Studios, May 1996)
- Bloodlust (2 Issues; writer/colors/letters, with art by BREED, Hardline Studios, August 99 to November 99)
- Force (writer/colors/letters, with art by Brent Evans, Hardline Studios, January 2000)
- Anomaly #3: Lapse (writer/inks/letters, with art by Mikel Whelan, Brass Ring Productions, July 2001)
- "loodlust"(writer, with art by Mikel Whelan, in Digital Webbing Presents #2, Digital Webbing Presents, March 2002)
- "Dragon of the Northern Pass" (writer, with art by Scott Benefiel, in Metal Hurlant magazine #8, Humanoids Publishing, September 2003)
- "Shelter Me" (writer, with art by Mark Vigouroux, in Metal Hurlant #9, Humanoids Publishing, November 2003)
- The Conversation (writer/letters, with art by David Hedgecock, Red Eye Press, January 2004)
- Razor X: Requiem (Postscript; writer, Avatar Press, May 2004)
- Hero Happy Hour Super Special - Busting Out (writer, with art by Brett Weldele, Geek Punk, July 2004)
- Blood-Stained Sword (writer, with art by Ben Templesmith, 48 page one-shot, IDW Publishing, January 2005)
- "Forbidden Valley" (writer, with art by Bobby Breed, in Western Tales of Terror #3, Hoarse & Buggy Productions, March 2005)
- "Lorne: Vanishing Herd" (writer, with art by Kody Chamberlain, in Event Horizon, Mam Tor Publishing, May 2005)
- "Lorne: The Eagle and the Serpent" (writer, with art by Szymon Kudranski, in Event Horison, Mam Tor Publishing, October 2005)
- 30 Days of Night: Dead Space (with co-writer Steve Niles, art by Milx, 3-issue mini-series, IDW Publishing, January - March 2006)
- I Am Spartacus (writer, with art by Illka Lesonen, Cellar Door Publishing, April 2006)
- Monkey in a Wagon VS Lemur on a Big Wheel - In Space No One Can Hear a Squeaky Wheel (writer with art by Mark Dos Santos, Silent Devil Productions, August 2006)
- 30 Days of Night: Spreading the Disease (writer with art by Alex Sanchez, 5-issue mini-series, IDW Publishing, December 2006 - April 2007)
- The Unusual Suspects (writer, with art by Nat Jones/Ben Templesmith/Tone Rodriguez/Chris Moreno/Etc., original graphic novel, Top Cow Productions, March 2007)
- Steve Niles' Strange Cases (writer, with art by David Hartman, 4-issue mini-series, Image Comics, August 2007 - June 2008)
- The Phantom Chronicles - Reflection of the Ghost (writer, Moonstone Books, October 2007)
- 1001 Arabian Nights: The Adventures of Sinbad (writer, with art by Gus Vasquez, Paolo Pantalena, Tone Rodriguez, Etc., Zenescope Entertainment, March 2008 - ongoing)
- The Avenger Chronicles - The Girl Who Saw Death (writer, Moonstone Books, July 2008)
- Savage (writer, with art by Mike Mayhew, Image/Shadowline, October 2008 - January 2009)
- Grimm Fairy Tales #27: Three Blind Mice (writer, with art by Dean Juliette, Zenescope Entertainment, May 2008)
- Grimm Fairy Tales #33: Three Snake Leaves (writer, with art by Jordan Gunderson, Zenescope Entertainment, December 2008)
- Grimm Fairy Tales #34: Puss In Boots (writer, with art by Unknown, Zenescope Entertainment, January 2008)
- Grimm Fairy Tales #35: Dorian Gray (writer, with art by Unknown, Zenescope Entertainment, February 2008)
