= Abigail (album) =

Studio album by King Diamond
- Released: 29 May 1987
- Recorded: December 1986 – February 1987
- Studios: Sound Track Studio, Copenhagen, Denmark
- Genre: Heavy metal
- Length: 40:16
- Label: Roadrunner
- Producer: King Diamond

King Diamond chronology
Fatal Portrait (1986)	Abigail (1987)	"Them" (1988)

Abigail is the second album by Danish heavy metal band King Diamond, and the band's first concept album. It was released on 29 May 1987 through Roadrunner Records. There were several re-releases, first in 1997 with four bonus tracks, and then a 25th anniversary edition in 2005 with a bonus DVD. Abigail is the last album to feature guitarist Michael Denner and bassist Timi Hansen.

== Plot ==
Abigail tells the story of a young couple, Miriam Natias and Jonathan La'Fey, who move into an old mansion that La'Fey inherited. It takes place in the summer of 1845. Upon their arrival they are warned by seven horsemen not to move into the house because if they do, "18 will become 9" ("Arrival"). They do not heed the warning and proceed to move into the mansion ("A Mansion in Darkness"). During their first night, Jonathan meets with Count de La'Fey, the Family Ghost, who is a deceased relative. The ghost shows him a casket in which the corpse of a stillborn child, Abigail, rests. The ghost informs him that Miriam is carrying the spirit of Abigail, and that the child will soon be reborn. He insists that Jonathan must kill Miriam at once to prevent the rebirth ("The Family Ghost").

The narration then relates the story of what happened to the Count and his wife: on 7 July 1777, the Count discovered his wife had been unfaithful to him, and that she was pregnant with an illegitimate child. Enraged, he pushed the Countess down the stairs, breaking her neck and causing the child to be stillborn. The Count had the body of the Countess cremated, and the stillborn fetus he named Abigail and had mummified and laid to rest in a sarcophagus, the Count having an inexplicable urge to preserve Abigail for the future ("The 7th Day of July 1777").

The narration then returns to the summer of 1845, during which Jonathan and Miriam are beset by a range of omens; the church bell rings despite nobody being inside to ring it, flowers die, unwholesome stenches fill the house, and they discover that the dining room table is set for three. In another incident, an empty cradle is discovered swaying through the air, when neither Jonathan nor Miriam brought a cradle with them ("Omens"). The next day, Miriam is clearly pregnant and the fetus develops quickly; Jonathan realizes that the family ghost was speaking the truth ("The Possession").

The fatal crisis begins when Jonathan accuses Abigail of possessing Miriam, and Abigail (through Miriam) admits it. Jonathan is terrified, and considers getting a priest to exorcise Miriam. Miriam, however -- exercising a moment of control -- urges him to cast her down the stairs and kill her, just as the Count slew the Countess and Abigail in 1777. Thinking quickly, Jonathan pretends to give in to Abigail's demands. He suggests that she come down to the family crypt, so she can be reborn where she died ("Abigail").

However, as Jonathan and Miriam stand at the top of the stairs, the possessed Miriam pushes Jonathan to his death. Miriam gives birth to Abigail, but dies shortly afterwards. Her last sight is of Abigail's "yellow eyes." Forever after, her ghost can be heard screaming on the stairs in the month of July. The seven horsemen arrive at the mansion, and discover baby Abigail in the sarcophagus. She is eating something too horrifying for the narrator to mention, although it's likely that Abigail is eating her own previous body. Appalled, they take her away to bury her in a hidden chapel in the forest ("Black Horsemen"), with seven silver spikes driven through her body (the burial is heard at the beginning of the album), in the hope that this will prevent a future resurrection ("Funeral").

== Critical reception ==
Professional ratings
Review scores
Source	Rating
AllMusic	4.5/5 stars
Collector's Guide to Heavy Metal	8/10
Metal.de	10/10
Ultimate Guitar	10/10

AllMusic's Eduardo Rivadavia wrote that Abigail is "widely recognized as King Diamond's solo masterpiece" and "is also unquestionably one of heavy metal's greatest concept albums". Canadian journalist Martin Popoff remarked the "metallic excellence" of the album, but was negatively taken aback by the "creepy package" and the lyrics.

Metal.de dubbed it "not only one of the most legendary albums in the entire history of heavy metal but also a blueprint for all concept albums within the genre. "Abigail" functions as a perfect, self-contained horror soundtrack—forty minutes of sustained tension, both musically and narratively."

It was King Diamond first album to enter the Billboard 200 at number 123 and their highest charting album in Sweden peaking at number 19. As of 2021, the album has sold 175,000+ copies in the US.

Guitarist Andy LaRocque said it is his favourite King Diamond album as the "good atmosphere we had as a band at that time is captured in the album."

== Legacy ==
Capcom made a homage to this album in its 1989 video game Final Fight, naming the (male) boss of its fifth stage as Abigail. This boss also has a face very similar to King Diamond's.

There is also a tribute to Diamond's father in the liner notes, "the bravest and noblest man" he claims to have ever known.

The video for "The Family Ghost" was featured in the Beavis and Butt-head episode "Bungholio: Lord of the Harvest", where it was ridiculed by the duo.

In 2011, the album was inducted into the Decibel Hall of Fame. The publication added that "This is the album that solidified Diamond’s legend as not only one of the great metal vocalists of all time, but a great horror storyteller (and songwriter) with a flair for the dramatic. This was the first of King Diamond’s epic concept albums, and its success most certainly paved the way for the subsequent 10—including Abigail II—that followed."

During King Diamonds 2015, US headlining tour they played Abigail in its entirety.

In 2025, Consequence ranked Abigail at number 40 on their list of the "75 Best Metal Albums of All Time".

== Track listing ==
All tracks are written by King Diamond, except where indicated.

No.	Title	Writer(s)	Length
1.	"Funeral"		1:30
2.	"Arrival"		5:26
3.	"A Mansion in Darkness"	Diamond, Andy LaRocque	4:34
4.	"The Family Ghost"		4:06
5.	"The 7th Day of July 1777"	Diamond, LaRocque	4:50
6.	"Omens"		3:56
7.	"The Possession"	Diamond, Michael Denner	3:26
8.	"Abigail"		4:50
9.	"Black Horsemen"		7:40

=== Remaster bonus tracks ===
No.	Title	Writer(s)	Length
10.	"Shrine"	Diamond, LaRocque	4:24
11.	"A Mansion in Darkness (Rough Mix)"	Diamond, LaRocque	4:36
12.	"The Family Ghost (Rough Mix)"		4:10
13.	"The Possession (Rough Mix)"	Diamond, Denner	3:31

=== DVD tracks (live in Sweden) ===
No.	Title	Length
1.	"Funeral"
2.	"Arrival"
3.	"Come to the Sabbath"
4.	"The Portrait"
5.	"The Family Ghost"
6.	"The 7th Day of July 1777"
7.	"Halloween"

== Personnel ==
=== King Diamond ===
- King Diamond – vocals
- Andy LaRocque – guitars
- Michael Denner – guitars
- Timi Hansen – bass guitar
- Mikkey Dee – drums

=== Production ===
- King Diamond – production
- Michael Denner – assistant production
- Mikkey Dee – assistant production
- Roberto Falcao – engineering, keyboards

== Charts ==
Chart (1987)	Peak position
Dutch Albums (Album Top 100)	68
Swedish Albums (Sverigetopplistan)	19
Billboard 200	123
