= Neil Kleid =

American cartoonist (born 1975)

- Born: 1975 (age 50–51) Michigan, United States
- Areas: Writer, Artist
- Notable works: Brownsville
- Awards: Xeric Award, 2003

Neil Kleid (born 1975) is an American cartoonist who received a 2003 Xeric Award grant for his graphic novella Ninety Candles (2004). Raised in Oak Park, Michigan, he lives in New Jersey

Kleid wrote Brownsville, a graphic novel about Murder, Inc., with Jake Allen; The Big Kahn, a graphic novel about family, faith, and con men, with Nicolas Cinquegrani, for NBM Publishing; and Ursa Minors!, an action/comedy mini-series for Slave Labor Graphics. He has written for Puffin Graphics, Marvel Comics, DC Comics, Image Comics, and Dark Horse Comics, and has created minicomics and cartoons for anthologies and magazines.

Kleid adapted Spider-Man: Kraven's Last Hunt to prose in 2014, the popular Marvel Comics storyline by J. M. DeMatteis and Mike Zeck, which was published by Marvel Press and Titan Books. In 2016, he co-plotted and wrote Powers: The Secret History of Deena Pilgrim, an original novel based on the popular comic book by Brian Michael Bendis and Michael Avon Oeming for MacMillan Books.

In 2020, Dark Horse Comics published Savor, Kleid's culinary adventure graphic novel with artists John Broglia and Frank Reynoso.

Outside of comic books, Kleid penned columns for now defunct online writer resource Scryptic Studios, and various online websites including PopCultureShock.com, PopImage.com, Newsarama.com, and SequentialTart.com. He was a founder and active member of the webcomic collective The Chemistry Set.

While writing/drawing various projects, Kleid spends his days as a UX/UI product designer, having helped co-found a series of mobile collecting apps for the Topps Company in New York, including Topps Pennant, Topps BUNT, Topps HUDDLE, and their popular Star Wars Card Trader app. Kleid has worked on marketing campaigns for Comedy Central and Miramax Films, has been employed as a designer by McCann, Girl Scouts and his work has appeared in Variety and The New York Times.

A Modern Orthodox Jew, Kleid has been a resident of Teaneck, New Jersey.

== Bibliography ==
=== Prose ===
- Return to the Motherfreaking Fun Factory an original horror novel. Published by Blackstone Publishing (2026).
- The Phoenix Chase an X-Men original novel. Published by Aconyte Books (2023).
- Kid Omega Faces The Music an X-Men prose short story appearing in School of X. Published by Aconyte Books (2021). Nominated for a 2022 Scribe Award.
- Spider-Man: Kraven's Last Hunt prose adaptation of the original Marvel Comics storyline by J. M. DeMatteis and Mike Zeck. Published by Marvel Comics (2014)
- Powers: The Secret History of Deena Pilgrim based on the comic book by Brian Michael Bendis and Michael Avon Oeming. Published by MacMillan Books (2016)

=== Comics and graphic novels ===
- Stable Rods mixed media minicomic, Self-Published
- Pilgrimage mixed media minicomic, Self-Published
- Rant Comics #1-3 serialized minicomics, Self-Published
- Late Night Block #1-3 serialized minicomics with Jamesmith, Max Riffner, Vanessa Satone, and cover artists Lea Hernandez, Carla Speed McNeil, and Michael Avon Oeming. Stories originally appeared at www.opi8.com
- "Letters From a Broken Apple" 10 page story in 9-11: Emergency Relief with Insight Studios. Published by Alternative Comics (2002)
- Ninety Candles, Self-Published with the help of the Xeric Foundation (2004)
- The Intimidators #1-4, created by Jim Valentino with artists Miguel Montenegro and CAFU. Published by Image Comics/Shadowline (2006)
- Brownsville OGN with artist Jake Allen. Published by NBM Publishing (2006)
- Call of the Wild written by Jack London, co-adapted with artist Alex Nino. Published by Puffin Graphics (2006)
- Ursa Minors #1-4 with co-writer Paul Cote and artist Fernando Pinto. Published by Slave Labor Graphics (2006)
- The Big Kahn OGN with artist Nicolas Cinquegrani. Published by NBM Publishing (2009)
- Savor OGN with artists John Broglia and Frank Reynoso. Published by Dark Horse Comics (2021)
- The Panic OGN with Andrea Mutti. Published by Comixology Originals and Dark Horse Comics (2022)
- Judas Priest: Screaming for Vengeance OGN with Rantz Hoseley and Chris Mitten. Published by Z2 Comics (2023)
- Nice Jewish Boys OGN with John Broglia and Ellie Wright. Published by Comixology Originals (2024)
- Medieval OGN with Alex Cormack. Published by Comixology Originals (2025)

=== Short comics ===
- 9-11: Emergency Relief, "Letters From a Broken Apple" with artists from Insight Studios (2001)
- House of Twelve #2.0, "I Was a Teenage Sci-Fi Writer" (2002)
- True Porn Vol. 1, "Shomer Negiah" (2003)
- Hero Happy Hour Super Special, "Secret Origin" with artist Neil Vokes (2004)
- X-Men Unlimited #14, "How To Be An Artist" with artist Michael Avon Oeming. Published by Marvel Comics (2006)
- Postcards, "Intersection" with artist Jake Allen. Published by Random House/Villard (2007)
- Comic Book Tattoo, "The Beekeeper" with artist Chris Mitten. Published by Image Comics (2008)
- Tales From the Crypt #2, "The Tenant" with artist Steve Mannion. Published by Papercutz (2008)
- Tales From the Crypt #4, "Extra Life" with artist Chris Noeth. Published by Papercutz (2008)
- Creepy Comics #1, "All The Help You Need" with artist Brian Churilla. Published by Dark Horse Comics (2009)
- Fractured Fables, "The House That Jack Built" with artist Fernando Pinto. Published by Image Comics/Shadowline (2010)
- Fraggle Rock Vol #1, #2, "The Convincing of Convincing John" with artist Fernando Pinto. Published by Archaia Studios (2010)
- Superman 2011 80 Page Giant, "Old Men Talking in Bars" with artist Dean Haspiel. Published by DC Comics (2011)
- Ghosts, "A Bowl of Red" with artist John McCrea. Published by DC Comics/Vertigo (2012)
- Mars Attacks Classic Obliterated, "This Island, Earth" with artist Carlos Valenzuela. Published by IDW Publishing (2013)
- Little Earthquakes, "Crucify Me" with artist Andy Macdonald. Published by Z2 Comics (2022)

=== Webcomics ===
- Todt Hill serialized webcomic with artist Kevin Colden, formerly hosted at The Chemistry Set
- Action, Ohio serialized webcomic with artist Paul Salvi, formerly hosted at Shadowline
- Kings and Canvas serialized digital comics with artists Jake Allen and Frank Reynoso, available at Comixology

== Awards ==
- Xeric Award grant for Ninety Candles, September 2003
