= The Werewolf of Fever Swamp =

14th Goosebumps novella

- First edition cover
- Author: R. L. Stine
- Cover artist: Tim Jacobus
- Language: English
- Series: Goosebumps
- Genre: Horror fiction children's literature
- Publisher: Scholastic
- Publication date: December 1993
- Publication place: United States
- Media type: Print (paperback)
- Pages: 123 (first edition)
- ISBN: 0-590-49449-X
- OCLC: 29391346
- LC Class: MLC R CP01334
- Preceded by: Piano Lessons Can Be Murder
- Followed by: You Can't Scare Me!

The Werewolf of Fever Swamp is the fourteenth book in the original Goosebumps, the series of children's horror fiction novellas created and authored by R. L. Stine. The story follows Grady Tucker, who moves into a new house next to the Fever Swamp with his family. After a swamp deer is killed, his father believes Grady's dog is responsible, but Grady is convinced a werewolf is the culprit.

The book was well received by critics, and was featured on the USA Today and Publishers Weekly bestseller list. In the mid-1990s, it was adapted for television, and was later released on both VHS and DVD. In 2006, the book was adapted into a comic book story in the volume Creepy Creatures.

== Plot ==
Grady and his family, the Tuckers, have moved from Burlington, Vermont to Florida into a house next to Fever Swamp because his father Mr. Tucker, a scientist, wants to determine if swamp deer from South America can survive in Florida. Grady's father keeps the deer in a pen but plans on releasing them in the swamp. Grady and his sister Emily get lost while exploring the swamp and meet a swamp hermit who lives in a shack. As the hermit chases after them, they run away ultimately making their way back home. A few days later, as Grady is going outside to meet Will Blake, one of his new friends, a big stray dog jumps onto Grady. Grady thinks the dog resembles more a wolf than a dog and decides to call the dog Wolf. One morning, Will tells him that a neighbor, Ed Warner, went missing after hunting in the swamp. Cassie O'Rourke, a girl who lives in the neighborhood, suggests that a werewolf is the reason for Mr. Warner's disappearance.

After going out to investigate some howling, Grady finds a hole that had been ripped from the deer pen and a slain deer laying on one side. Mr. Tucker sees paw prints around the pen and blames Wolf for the killing. He plans on taking Wolf to the pound, but Grady is convinced that a werewolf killed the deer and other animals in town, and he helps the dog flee before Mr. Tucker can capture Wolf. That night, Grady hears howling and observes Wolf slowly moving towards the swamp shortly afterward. As Grady follows the dog he runs into Will, who says he heard the howls and decided to investigate them. While they are following Wolf, Grady gets separated from both the dog and Will.

Eventually, Grady comes across the swamp hermit's shack and begins to hear loud howling coming from nearby. Worried that the swamp hermit is a werewolf, he starts to flee before he is suddenly attacked by the werewolf, who is revealed to be Will. During the struggle, Will bites into Grady's shoulder, causing Grady to become a werewolf. Wolf reappears and fights off Will before Grady passes out. When Grady regains consciousness, he learns from his mother that the swamp hermit found him and carried him home. His parents also let Grady keep Wolf after discovering that the dog saved his life. When Mr. Tucker goes to check on Will, he finds his house completely abandoned. A month passes by, and Grady continues to explore the swamp with Cassie and Wolf. During the next full moon, Grady (now a werewolf) and his dog go out to hunt.

== Release and reception ==
The Werewolf of Fever Swamp was first published in December 1993 by Scholastic, and reissued in October 2009 under the Classic Goosebumps rename. The book was featured in USA Today's Top 150 Best-Selling Books database for 73 weeks, attaining a peak position of 24. In 2001, it was listed as the 209th bestselling children's paperback book of all time by Publishers Weekly, having sold 1,577,808 copies.

Gary Westfahl, writing in Science Fiction, Children's Literature, and Popular Culture: Coming of Age in Fantasyland, described the book as a story of victimization. Nathan Reese from Complex.com, who listed it as his fifth favorite book in the Goosebumps series, called it a story of alienation and transformation. Writer Brian J. Frost felt The Werewolf of Fever Swamp was one of the best werewolf novels in the series, stating it "heightens the suspense by concealing the identity of the werewolf until the very end."

== Television adaptation and home media ==
In the 1990s, The Werewolf of Fever Swamp was adapted into a television special, which first aired on May 17, 1996 on the Fox Network. The special was later split into two parts and denoted as the 18th and 19th episodes of the Goosebumps television series' first season. The special starred Brendan Fletcher as Grady Tucker, Maria Ricossa as Grady's mother, Mairon Bennett as Emily, Geoffrey Bowes as Grady's father, Michael Barry as Will, and Don Francks as the swamp hermit. Neal Shusterman wrote the special, while Steve Levitan served as producer, and William Fruet served as director. Kimberly M. Hutmacher from Kaboose described it as "a suspenseful well-crafted mystery."

The Werewolf of Fever Swamp was released on VHS in 1997. Billboard listed the video as the 19th best-selling children's video in 1997, the only Goosebumps video on the list. In 2004, the TV special was also released on DVD.

== Comic book story ==
Gabriel Hernandez adapted the book into a comic book story in Creepy Creatures, published on September 1, 2006, as the first book in the Goosebumps Graphix series. Kat Kan, writing for Booklist, stated that Hernandez "uses sketchy but expressive art to convey the spooky atmosphere" in the story, and the ""gotcha" ending of the tale is particularly well done." The comic book story reappeared along with three other Goosebumps book adaptations in the Goosebumps Graphix book Slappy's Tales of Horror, published August 25, 2015.
