= Inverna Lockpez =

Cuban-American painter

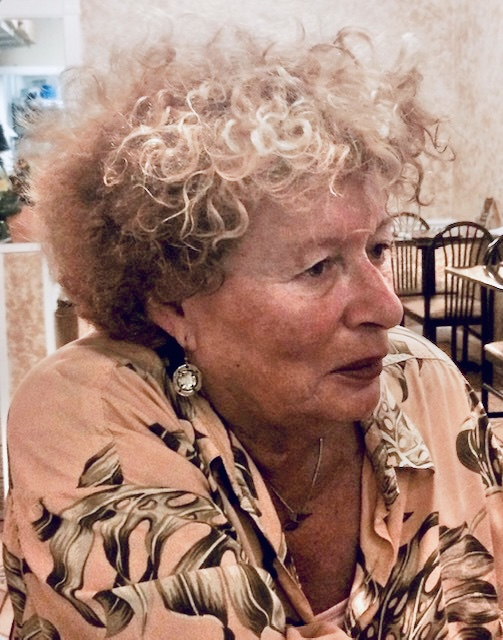
- Inverna Lockpez
- Born: November 21, 1941 (age 84); Havana, Cuba
- Education: University of Havana; National Academy of San Alejandro; Taller de Grabado; School of Social Work at Columbia University; School of Visual Arts
- Known for: Painter, Sculptor
- Website: InvernaLockpez.com

Inverna Lockpez (born November 21, 1941) is a Cuban American painter, sculptor, and activist, that participated in the second wave of America's feminist movement. She is known for her graphic novel Cuba: My Revolution (illustrated by Dean Haspiel), a fictionalized memoir of her life prior to coming to the United States.

== Biography ==
Inverna Lockpez was born in Havana, Cuba. Growing up, Lockpez yearned to be an artist although her mother wanted her to follow in her father’s footsteps and be a doctor. However, in 1959, after Fidel Castro overthrew Cuban President Fulgencio Batista, Lockpez decided to set aside art and pursue a career in medical studies. During the 1961 Bay of Pigs Invasion, Lockpez was a volunteer doctor and went to the front-lines to help. There, Lockpez helped an injured prisoner and was arrested for conspiracy. While in prison, Lockpez was tortured repeatedly by her own comrades. After three months, Lockpez was found by her father in prison where he paid for her release. Later she began to focus on art again, and in September 1965, Lockpez had an art exhibition at the Czechoslovak Embassy. On opening day riots formed outside the embassy against her work because she defied Castro's approved artistic categories. Lockpez’s artwork was confiscated and she had to go into hiding. After receiving her travel visa, Lockpez left Cuba in September 1966, and moved to the United States.

After settling in New York, Lockpez joined the NYC Women Artists in Revolution, an organization that protested against museums and galleries who did not present female artists. She exhibited in the first all-female art exhibition X12 in 1970. During the 1970s, Lockpez primarily focused on sculptures, and in 1972, her 25-foot sculpture Walking Pineapples won an outdoor competition promoted by The Municipal Art Society. However, her artwork was met with much controversy because New York at the time was dominated by minimalist and conceptual art. In the late 70's, she was commissioned by The Bronx Council on the Arts to paint indoor murals at a community center and a day care center. In 1978, she became the director of INTAR Gallery, New York City, which focused on exhibiting the work of Latino, Black, Asian and Native American artists. She attended the School of Visual Arts in Manhattan and studied film, video, and computer graphics. Her art reflected themes of ecology and the welfare of the environment. Since 1985, her work has been in more than 80 exhibits across the United States. She was commissioned to paint several indoor murals. Her graphic design posters were published by the John F. Kennedy Center in Washington, D.C.; book covers by Theater Communications Group in New York City; and she designed sets and costumes for various theaters. She moved to a converted Mill on the East Branch of the Delaware River in upstate New York in 1985, and began her series Markings of the Land. Her art was mainly black and white and full of mountains and animal iconography. From the early 80's to the middle 90's she curated more than sixty exhibitions, lectured around the country, and was a consultant and panelist for more than 15 non-profit arts organizations. In 1988 Lockpez became the president of the National Association of Artists' Organizations (NAAO.) In 2001, she became the Director of the Catskill Center’s Erpf Gallery in Arkville, and the Platte Clove Artist-in-Residency Program.

In 2008, The Noble Barn was published. It's a collection of 32 color images of Lockpez' paintings of icons of rural America life done in an expressionistic technique that suggests a way of regarding the relationship between the natural landscape and the work of human hands.

In 2010, Cuba: My Revolution was published by DC Comics/Vertigo, documenting her struggles from her time during the Cuban Revolution until her eventual coming to America.

Currently, Lockpez lives in Florida and is working on her new series of works, entitled Avian Impressions and The Boat Run. Her work is represented by Arts on Douglas Gallery in New Smyrna Beach and The Other Half Gallery in Vero, both of Florida.

== Education ==
Lockpez attended medical school at the University of Havana, then she studied painting and sculpture at the National Academy of San Alejandro. Afterwards, she studied printmaking at Taller de Grabado. Lockpez attended the School of Social Work at Columbia University once she came to the United States and later in the 1980s, she attended the School of Visual Arts in Manhattan.

== Awards ==
- CINTAS Foundation Visual Arts Fellowship (1970 and 1971)
- CAPS – Creative Artists Public Service, sculpture (1973 and 1978)
- National Endowment for the Arts for sculpture (1977)
- Vogelstein Foundation for painting (1977)
- CETA – Comprehensive Training and Employment Act (1978 and 1979)
- New York State Council on the Arts (1998 and 2000) Roxbury Arts Group

== Selected exhibitions ==
- X12 (1970), the first all-female at MUSEUM, A Project for Living Artists, New York, NY
- The Flag Show (1970) Judson Memorial Church, New York, NY
- Women Choose Women (1973) Department of Cultural Affairs, New York, NY
- Contemporary Reflections (1975) Aldrich Museum, Ridgefield, CT
- Three New York Artists (1976) Artist’s Space, New York, NY
- Places (1978) 55 Mercer St. Gallery, New York, NY
- Hispanic Artists in New York (1981) City Gallery, New York, NY and Rutgers University, New Jersey
- Oceania (1981) Cayman Gallery, New York, NY
- Mares (1983) Hamilton College, Clinton, NY
- Works of the Americas (1984) Kenkeleba Gallery, New York, NY
- North of the Border (1985) Nexus Gallery, Philadelphia, PA
- Adios Columbus (1992) Hillwood Art Museum, Long Island University, Long Island, NY
- Intimate Lives (1993) Women and Their Work, Austin, TX; (1994) El Paso Museum, El Paso, TX
- Water Should (August, 1999) Erpf Gallery, Arkville, NY
- Natural Elements (October, 2000) Upstate Art, NY
- The Noble Barn (August, 2002) The Walt Meade Gallery, Roxbury, NY
- The Last Barn (October, 2004) The Hunting Tavern Museum, Andes, NY
- Journeys (June, 2006) Chance-Randall Gallery, Andes, NY
- Covered Bridges (October, 2008) Chance-Randall Gallery, Andes, NY
- Avian Impressions (2012) Chase-Randall Gallery, Andes, NY
- Passages (2020) Arts on Douglas, FL

== Selected Curatorial Exhibits ==
- Lydia Cabrera: An Intimate Portrait (1984) the first retrospective on the leading authority on Afro-Cuban culture accompanied by a three-part Afro-Cuban music series and lectures
- W.A.R.M. Show, first New York show of the Women's Art Resources of Minnesota, New York, NY
- Women of the Southwest (1983) the first time exhibition in New York City of fifteen women artists from the Southwest
- Posters of the Spanish Civil War,1937–38
- Chicano Expressions: A New View in American Art (1986–87) the first comprehensive exhibition in the Northeast of over 50 artists
- Outside Cuba (1986–87) traveling exhibition of six generations of Cuban visual artists, the first in the United States, and co-curated with Ricardo Riviera and Ricardo Paul-Llosa
- Two Worlds/Two Rooms (1989) James Luna's first exhibition in New York City, synthesizes and balances the dualities imposed on Native Americans, INTAR Gallery, New York, NY
- Another Face of the Diamond: Pathway Through the Black Atlantic South (1989) traveling exhibition of eleven outsider artists first exhibited in New York City
- Heresies (1993) black and white photography portfolio, New York, NY
- Engaged Cultures, Gallery Association of New York (1993–95) traveling exhibition of ten contemporary Latin-American artist
- Ponder These Things (1994) New York State Museum, Albany, NY
- Rejoining the Spiritual: The Land in Contemporary Latin American Art (1994) eight large installations made by artists around the country at the Maryland Institute College of Art

== Publications ==
- Chicano expressions: a new view in American art (1986)
- Another Face of the Diamond: pathways through the Black Atlantic South (1988) co-author
- Mira!: the Canadian Club Hispanic art Tour III (1988) co-author
- Chicano Expressions: A New View in American Art (1986)
- Grotto of the Virgins (1987) co-author
- The Migrations of Meaning (1992) co-author
- Rejoining the Spiritual: the Land in Contemporary Latin American Art (1994) co-author
- The Noble Barn (2008) For years Lockpez's paintings have been paying tribute to the Catskills landscape and more specifically to symbols of farm culture. The Noble Barn book includes more than forty pieces of work representing Delaware County barns and essays by prominent scholars. This painting series was sold out.
- Cuba: My Revolution (2010) Ms. Lockpez wrote a graphic novel inspired by her coming of age experiences in Cuba in the 1950s and '60s. Published by DC Comics/Vertigo, and illustrated by Emmy Award winner Dean Haspiel, and colored by Jose Villarubia. The Kentler International Drawing Space in Brooklyn, New York, displayed Ms. Lockpez’s original pencil drawings from the 1960s that were incorporated into the book, as well as Haspiel's original sketches and layouts of the graphic novel. The following year the exhibition was also displayed at the Miami Book Fair, Florida.

== Bibliography ==
- American Historical Review. Dec. 2018, Vol. 123 Issue 5, p1602-1603. 2p.
- Fuentes-Pérez, Ileana, Graciella Cruz-Taura, and Ricardo Pau-Llosa. Outside Cuba: Contemporary Cuban Visual Artists. New Brunswick: Office of Hispanic Arts, Mason Gross School of the Arts, Rutgers, the State University of New Jersey, 1989. Print
- Glueck, Grace. "Art Notes." The New York Times, 7 Jan. 1973.
- Heresies. 1993, Vol. 7 Issue 27, p87. 1p. 1 Black and White Photograph.
- Johnston, Laurie. "Women Activism Turns To Alternatives in Arts." The New York Times, 21 Mar. 1973.
- Keyes, Allison. "Graphic Novel Tells Grim Story Of Cuban Revolution." NPR, NPR, 24 Nov. 2010.
- Lockpez, Inverna, and Judith McWillie. Another Face of the Diamond: Pathways Through the Black Atlantic South, January 23-March 3, 1989. New York, N.Y: INTAR, Hispanic Arts Center, 1988. Print.
- Lockpez, Inverna. Chicano Expressions: A New View in American Art. New York, N.Y: Intar Latin American Gallery, 1986. Print.
- Heresies. 1993, Vol. 7 Issue 27, p87. 1p. 1 Black and White Photograph.
- Modern & Contemporary Art. New York: Bonhams, 2011. Print.
- Rosati, Lauren, and Mary A. Staniszewski. Alternative Histories: New York Art Spaces, 1960 to 2010, 2012. Print.
- Schenker, Brett. "Review - Cuba: My Revolution." Graphic Policy, 27 Nov. 2010.
- Torruella, Leval S, Ricardo Pau-Llosa, and Inverna Lockpez. Míra!: The Canadian Club Hispanic Art Tour Iii, 1988-1989. Farmington Hills, MI?: Hiram Walker, Inc.?, 1988. Print.
