= Creepy Creatures =

2006 novel

- Author: R. L. Stine, Gabriel Hernandez, Greg Ruth, Scott Morse
- Language: English
- Series: Goosebumps Graphix
- Genre: Horror fiction, Children's literature
- Published: September 1, 2006 Scholastic
- Publisher: Scholastic Graphix
- Publication place: United States
- Media type: Print (Paperback and Hardcover)
- Pages: 144 (first edition)
- ISBN: 0-439-84124-0
- OCLC: 70582931
- Followed by: Terror Trips

Creepy Creatures is the first book in R. L. Stine's Goosebumps Graphix series. It is a comic book that contains three stories: The Werewolf of Fever Swamp adapted by Gabriel Hernandez, The Scarecrow Walks At Midnight adapted by Greg Ruth and The Abominable Snowman of Pasadena adapted by Scott Morse, all based on the Goosebumps books by R. L. Stine. The book was first published on September 1, 2006 by Scholastic in the United States.

== Plot summary ==
=== The Werewolf of Fever Swamp ===
Grady and his family the Tuckers move into a house next to Fever Swamp in Florida. Grady finds and convinces his parents to let him keep a large wolf-like stray dog for a pet which he names Wolf, but when something has broken into the deer pen in Grady's yard and killed one of the animals, his father Mr. Tucker decides that the stray had to be taken to the pound. Grady helps the dog flee before his dad can capture it. That night, Grady hears the howling again and explores Fever Swamp to get to the bottom of things. He encounters Will Blake, one of his friends, who is slowly turning into a werewolf under the full moon. The newly changed werewolf bites Grady, but the assault is cut short when Wolf attacks and chases away Will. On the night of the next full moon, Grady transforms into a werewolf and joins Wolf in hunting.

=== The Scarecrow Walks At Midnight ===
While visiting their grandparents, Curtis and Miriam, Mark and Jodie notice strange movements at night: the scarecrows are moving, and their grandparents are acting differently. Jodie concludes that Sticks, the groundskeeper Stanley's son, made the scarecrows move. Jodie dresses Mark up as a scarecrow for revenge on Sticks. However, after a scarecrow tries to hurt Jodie, Sticks explains to her that Stanley brought the scarecrows to life last time he visited the farm. Curtis and Miriam had been trying to keep Stanley happy so that he will keep the scarecrows asleep. After scaring Stanley with the scarecrow costume, the scarecrows begin walking towards them. Sticks uses torches to burn all the scarecrows, and they all fall to the ground. The next afternoon, Jodie notices a stuffed bear move a little.

This comic has a significant use of figurative language. For example, one instance is when Jodie hugs her grandpa and he asks if she got her hair from a store. She replies with, "You're right, Grandpa. It's a wig." The author uses verbal irony to exemplify how close the two are with their humor. The author also uses ambiguity with the word choice to create tension. Stanley states, "The corn has ears." This statement is both true literally, but it also brings suspense to the story with a suggestion that there is something supernatural in the field. Onomatopoeia is used with the repeated word "scrape" to bring a more heightened sense of fear and intensity during the nightmare scene.

=== The Abominable Snowman of Pasadena ===
Jordan and Nicole Blake decide to join their father on a trip to Alaska to try to locate a snow creature known as the Abominable Snowman. There, they eventually see the Snowman frozen in ice. Their father decides to take him back to Pasadena, California, where they live. Before doing so, Luis sneaks some snowballs in the trunk in which the Snowman would be taken home.

After showing their neighbor Lauren Sax the Snowman, Ana throws a snowball from the trunk at her, but it misses and hits the tree. This causes the snow to expand and covers their yard in snow. Lauren grabs some of the snow and throws it at Ana, and she becomes covered in ice. After the heat from the furnace and oven does not defrost her, Luis gets the Snowman to break out of the ice. The Snowman defrosts her and escapes.

== Reception ==
Melissa T. Jenvey from the School Library Journal stated that this book was "a great option for younger readers interested in graphic novels, and the nostalgia is there for the older set". George Galuschak from Kliatt stated that this book is too intense for younger children, but too boring for older ones. Kat Kan from Booklist commented "the “gotcha” ending of ["The Werewolf of Fever Swamp"] is particularly well done" and that the book "graphic-novel format is sure to attract its own following". R.J. Carter from The Trades stated that the book "will certainly be welcomed by little boys and ghouls who are already fans of the Goosebumps novels", but stated that "The Abominable Snowman of Pasadena" adapted by Scott Morse was an easy skip.
