= Miss Lasko-Gross =

American comics artist

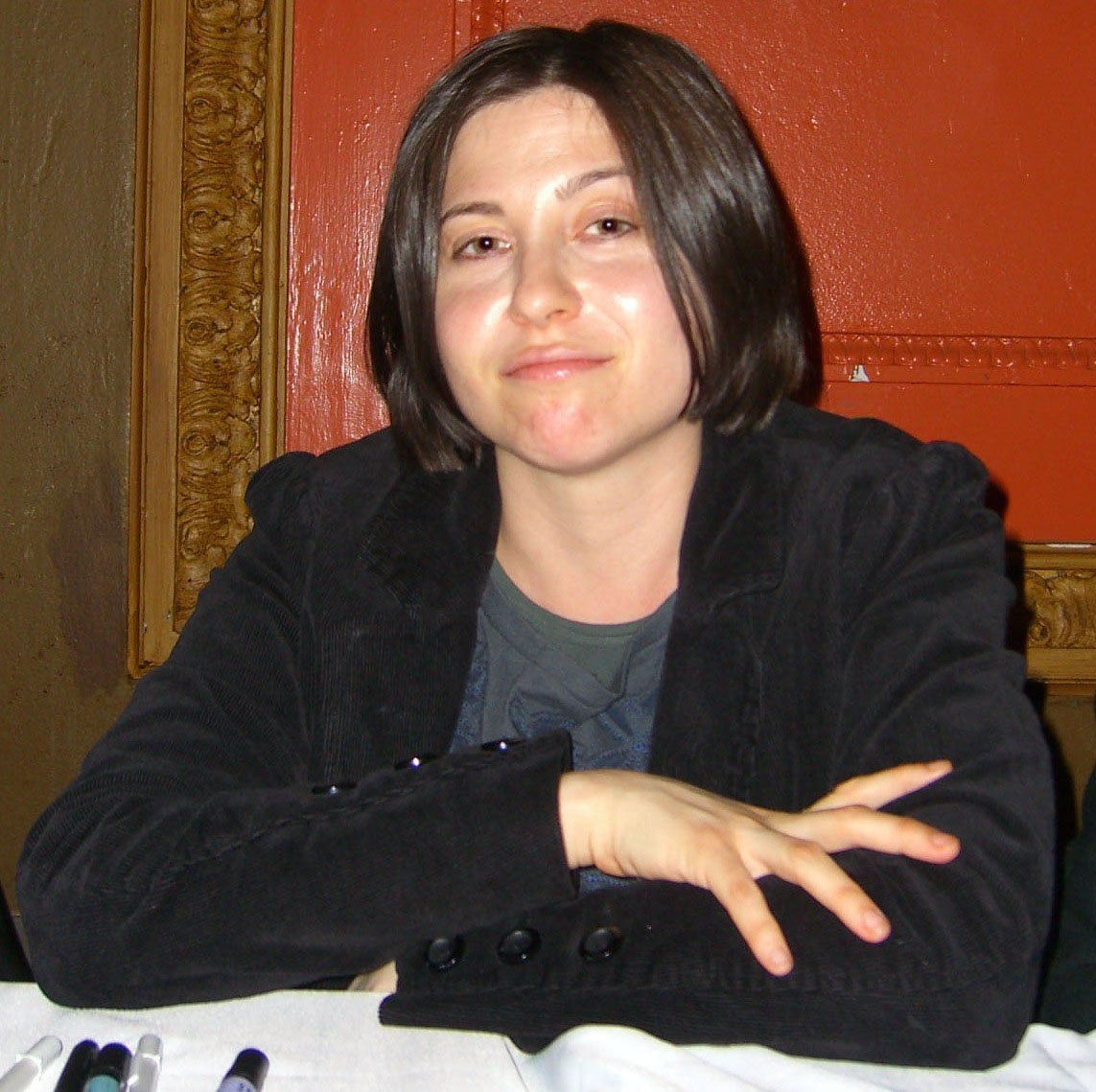
- Lasko-Gross at the Comic New York symposium at Columbia University's Low Memorial Library on March 24, 2012.
- Born: Melissa Lasko; 1977 (age 48–49) Boston, Massachusetts
- Areas: Writer, Artist, Publisher
- Notable works: Henni, Escape from Special; A Mess of Everything
- Awards: YALSA's 2008 Great Graphic Novels nominee Graphic novel named one of Booklist's Top 10 Graphic Novels of 2010

Melissa Lasko-Gross (known professionally as Miss Lasko-Gross) is an American comics creator, known for her semi-autobiographical graphic novels Escape from "Special" and A Mess of Everything.

== Early life ==
Melissa Lasko was born in Boston, Massachusetts, in 1977. She grew up reading comics, with her favorite ones ranging from Fantastic Four to Love and Rockets.

== Career ==
In high school, Lasko-Gross began to create her own self-published comic series, Aim, which she promoted by doing consignments with local comic book stores. It was at this point that she became a member of the comic book community. She said she found more kinship with comic creators than with comic fans, as they could bond over the process of producing a comic.

Lasko-Gross' first two graphic novels were Escape from "Special" and A Mess of Everything, both published by Fantagraphics. The first, based loosely on the author's life growing up as a Jewish girl in the suburbs, was published in 2008 and earned her a nomination for YALSA's 2008 Great Graphic Novel award. A Mess of Everything, a sequel of sorts to her first book, was also well received, as it was named one of Booklist's top 10 graphic novels of the year in 2010.

Lasko-Gross' graphic novel Henni, about "cute animals and religious fundamentalism in a horrible, twisted marriage", was published by Z2 Comics in 2015. She is working on a long-term novel project that chronicles the experience of a burn victim of an explosion.

== Bibliography ==
- (with Kevin Colden) The Sweetness (4 issues, Z2 Comics, 2016)
- Henni. Z2 Comics. January 6, 2015. ISBN 978-1940878027.
- A Mess of Everything (Fantagraphics, 2009)
- Escape from "Special" (Fantagraphics, 2006)
- Aim (self-published, 1993–2001)
