= Kevin Colden =

American comic book writer and artist

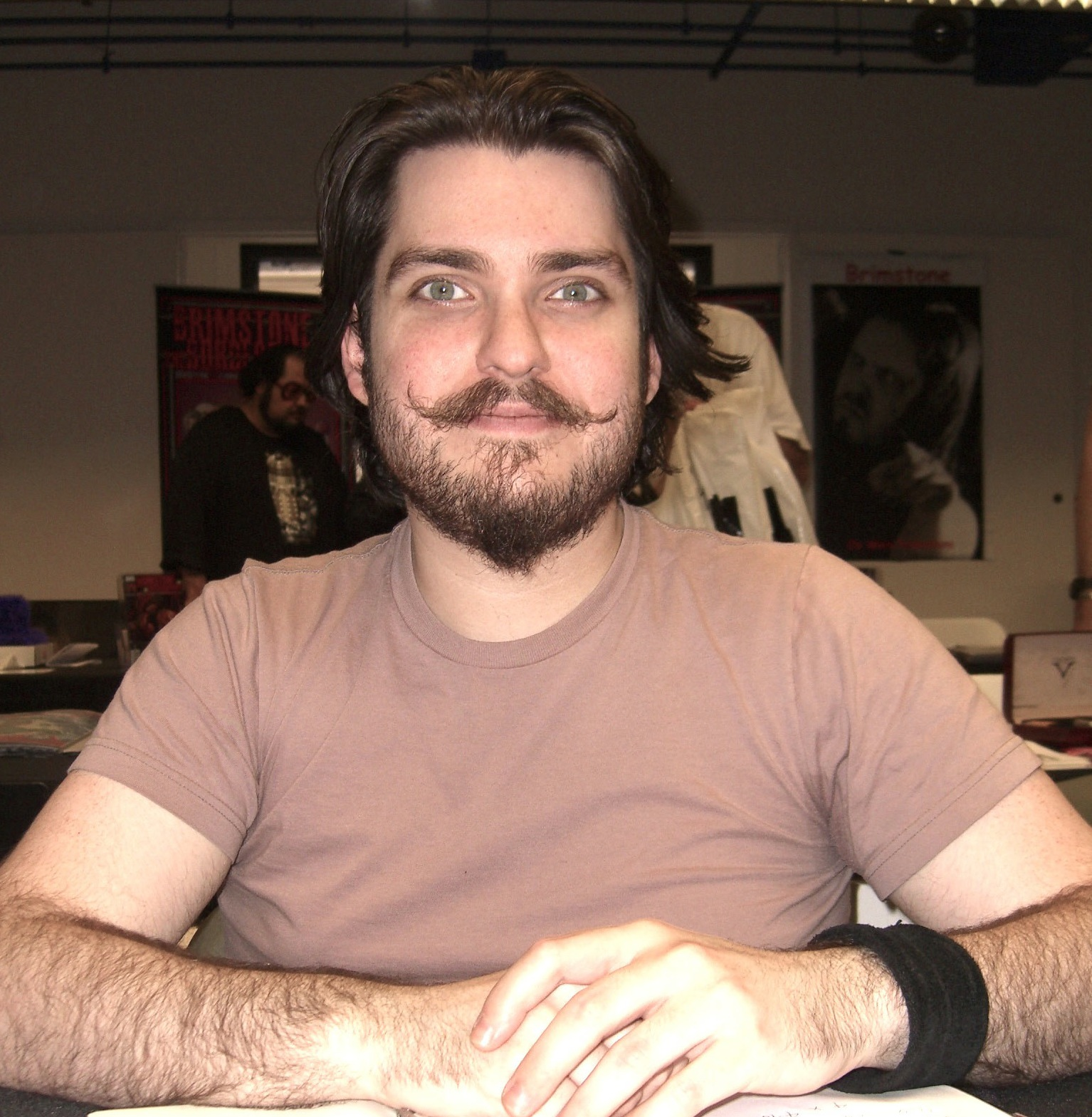
- Colden at the Big Apple Convention, May 21, 2011.
- Born: Kevin Colden Upper Darby, Pennsylvania

Kevin Colden is an American comic book writer and artist, as well as a webcomic artist. His work has been published in print by Zuda Comics, IDW Publishing, Image Comics, Alternative Comics, and Top Shelf Productions.

In 2007 Colden received a Xeric Grant to complete his graphic novel Fishtown (2008); the book was nominated for an Eisner Award in 2009.

== Early life ==
Colden graduated in 2001 from the Joe Kubert School of Cartoon and Graphic Art.

== Career ==
Colden's career began in 2003, writing and illustrating short horror/humor stories for House of Twelve, Asylum Press and Media-Blasters. In 2006, he co-founded The Chemistry Set webcomic collective, where he created the horror comic Todt Hill with writer Neil Kleid. That year, he began illustrating covers for Sequart Research & Literacy Organization's non-fiction books. In 2007, Colden's graphic novel Fishtown, based on the Murder of Jason Sweeney, was awarded a Xeric Grant, but he declined the money in order to serialize the book with the ACT-I-VATE webcomics collective. It was published in print by IDW Publishing in Fall 2008 and was nominated for a 2009 Eisner Award in the category of Best Reality-Based Work. In December 2008, his webcomic I Rule the Night began on Zuda Comics. It was moved to the DC Comics digital app in 2010.

In 2012, Colden teamed with novelist and screenwriter John Shirley to create the first new comic book update of James O'Barr's The Crow in thirteen years, entitled The Crow: Death and Rebirth.

== Bibliography ==
- Joe Palooka miniseries cover artist at IDW Publishing 2013
- The Crow: Death and Rebirth miniseries with writer John Shirley at IDW Publishing 2012
- Baby With a Mohawk webcomic at Trip City, 2012–Present
- Tartaros, short story, written by David Gallaher in Immortals: Gods and Heroes, Archaia Studios Press 2011
- Grimm's Fairy Tales v2 Illustrated edition of classic fairy tales IDW Publishing, 2011
- DC Retroactive colors for Wonder Woman and Flash 1970's and 1980s, DC Comics, 2011
- The Postmodern Prometheus short story in Strange Adventures #1 Vertigo, 2011
- Yours Truly, Jack the Ripper miniseries, written by Joe R. Lansdale, IDW Publishing, 2010
- Grimm's Fairy Tales v1 Illustrated edition of classic fairy tales IDW Publishing, 2010
- I Rule the Night webcomic at Zuda Comics
- Fishtown serialized on ACT-I-VATE 2007-2008, IDW Publishing, 2008; reprinted in the March 2014 collection Mean Streets
- Todt Hill webcomic at The Chemistry Set with Neil Kleid
- RED one-shot with Elizabeth Genco, self-published
- Awesome 2: Awesomer anthology story "Good As New" with Elizabeth Genco, Top Shelf Productions
- This Is A Souvenir anthology story "A Bench in a Park" with Tony Lee, Image Comics
- House of Twelve: Touching Children's Stories Front and back cover art House of Twelve
- STRANGLE/SWITCH short story webcomic at Zuda Comics

== Awards ==
- 2007: Xeric Grant, Fishtown
- 2009: Eisner Award Nomination, Fishtown, Best Reality-Based Work
