= Scott Morse =

American animator

- Areas: Writer, Penciller, Inker, Letterer, Colourist
- Pseudonyms: C. Scott Morse; C. S. Morse
- Notable works: Soulwind

Scott Morse (sometimes known as C. Scott Morse or C. S. Morse) is an American animator, filmmaker, and comic book artist/writer.

Much of Morse's published work consists of stand-alone graphic novels, although he is perhaps best known for his 1997 epic series Soulwind, a story serialised in a sequence of graphic novels, which was nominated for both the Eisner and Ignatz awards.

== Biography ==
Scott Morse was trained at the California Institute of the Arts (commonly known as CalArts), where he majored in Character Animation. In his sophomore year he was hired out to work at Chuck Jones' Film Productions.

His comic book work includes work as illustrator and/or author on the series' Southpaw, Magic Pickle, Plastic Man (DC Comics), the mini-series Elektra: Glimpse & Echo (Marvel), and a three-comic story arc for Catwoman. Morse also illustrated the first six issues of Case Files: Sam & Twitch, a spin-off of the Spawn comic book series. He has contributed to the graphic novels Cut My Hair (Oni Press) and Hellboy: Weird Tales vol.2 (Dark Horse) among others.

Morse's own graphic novels have been released through a variety of publishing houses, including Oni Press, Dark Horse, Top Shelf Productions and Image Comics. He also adapted the R.L. Stine Goosebumps story The Abominable Snowman of Pasadena —one of three tales included in the volume Creepy Creatures— for Scholastic Press's graphic novel imprint, Graphix. While some of his graphic novels are intended for younger readers, Morse's work typically finds a much larger audience.

In the field of animation, he has worked as a character designer, storyboard artist, and art director for companies such as Disney, Universal, and Cartoon Network. Morse played a large part in the Pixar short film Your Friend the Rat, which accompanies the 2007 film Ratatouille on DVD. This short film marked Pixar's first real 2-D animation project on a short-film scale.

== Bibliography ==
=== Graphic novels ===
- Spaghetti Western (2004, Oni Press)
- The Barefoot Serpent (2003, Top Shelf Prod.)
- The Complete Soulwind (2003, Oni Press)
- Ancient Joe (2002, Dark Horse)
- Smack Dab (2000, Crazy Fish/MJ-12)
- Volcanic Revolver (2000, Oni Press)
- Visitations (1998, Oni Press)
- Littlegreyman (1997, Image Comics)

NOTE: Soulwind was first published as a comic book series by Image Comics, then as a series of graphic novels by Oni Press, before being released in the single volume listed above.

=== Other publications ===
- Le Sketch #08 (2009, Le Sketch) – mini-comic with sketches
- Scrap Mettle (2008, Image Comics) – sketchbook and other artwork collection
- Noble Boy (2006, Adhouse Books) – large format board book
- Little Book Of Horror: Frankenstein (2005, IDW Publishing) – with Steve Niles, hardcover
- Grendel: Devil's Blessing art & lettering

=== Magic Pickle series ===
- Magic Pickle – graphic novel (May 2008)
- Magic Pickle and the Planet of the Grapes (March 2008)
- Magic Pickle Vs. the Egg Poacher (March 2008)
- Magic Pickle and the Roots of Doom - graphic novel (August 2024)
