= Joaquim de Almeida =

Portuguese actor (born 1957)

Joaquim de Almeida CvIH
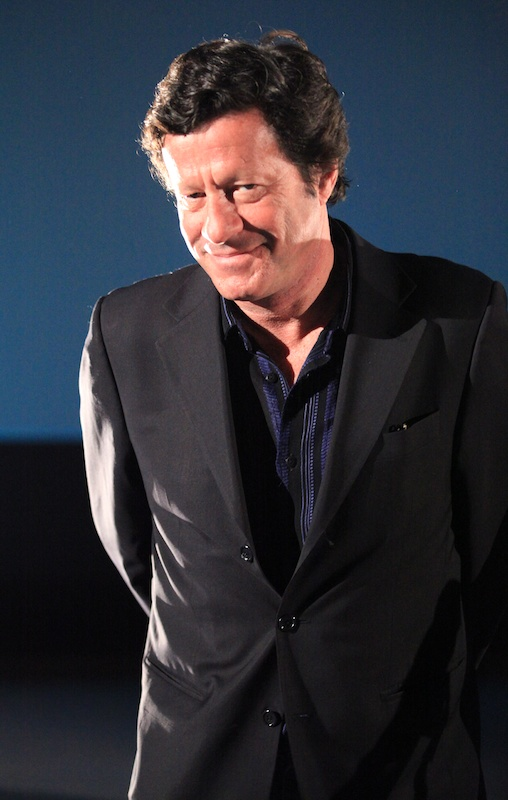
- De Almeida at the 2011 Festival International du Film d'Amour de Mons
- Born: 15 March 1957 (age 69); Lisbon, Portugal
- Citizenship: Portugal; United States (2005–present)
- Occupation: Actor
- Years active: 1982–present
- Spouses: Andrea Nemetz (m. 1976, divorced) Anne Rogoshan (m. 1979, divorced) Maria Cecília Gonçalves (m. 1992, divorced)
- Children: 2

Joaquim António Portugal Baptista de Almeida CvIH (European Portuguese pronunciation: [ʒwaˈkĩ ɐ̃ˈtɔni.u puɾtuˈɣal βaˈtiʃtɐ ðɨ alˈmɐjðɐ, - ɐ̃ˈtɔnju -]; born 15 March 1957) is a Portuguese actor. He began his film career playing a role in the 1982 action film The Soldier, and later achieved recognition for playing Andrea Bonanno in the 1987 Italian film Good Morning, Babylon. He achieved international fame with his portrayals of Félix Cortez in the 1994 thriller Clear and Present Danger and Bucho in the 1995 action thriller Desperado. Several years later, he became popular for playing Ramon Salazar on the Fox thriller drama series 24, between 2003 and 2004, and Hernan Reyes in the 2011 film Fast Five, a role he reprised in 2023's Fast X.

Fluent in several languages, de Almeida has worked in several countries in Europe and the Americas, in many film and stage productions, winning some international awards in films like Retrato de Família, Adão e Eva and O Xangô de Baker Street. His other well-known films include The Honorary Consul (1983), Only You (1994), La Cucaracha (1998), One Man's Hero (1999), Behind Enemy Lines (2001), Whore (2004), The Death and Life of Bobby Z (2007), Che: Part Two (2008), The Burning Plain (2008), and The Gilded Cage (2013).

== Early life and education ==
Joaquim António Portugal Baptista de Almeida was born in Lisbon, Portugal, as the son of João Baptista de Almeida and Maria Sara Portugal. At the age of 18, after attending a theater course at the Lisbon Conservatory (School of Theatre and Cinema) for two years, he left Portugal to continue his studies after the Conservatory was temporarily closed following the 1974 democratic revolution. He spent a year in Vienna, moving again in 1976 to New York City, where he studied at the Lee Strasberg Theatre and Film Institute, a school for the performing arts.

== Career ==
=== 1980s ===
After his early work in theater, de Almeida started his film career in 1982 appearing in The Soldier. His first significant role came in a 1983 film, The Honorary Consul. He made appearances in television series such as Miami Vice, and made his breakthrough four years later when he appeared in Good Morning, Babylon, a film directed by Paolo and Vittorio Taviani that opened the Cannes Film Festival in 1987. Being fluent in six languages, de Almeida continued his acting career in several countries such as Portugal, England, Spain, France, Italy, Brazil, Argentina, and Germany, working in numerous films.

=== 1990s ===
In 1994, de Almeida played Félix Cortez, a former colonel of Cuban military intelligence in the Tom Clancy thriller, Clear and Present Danger, co-starring Harrison Ford, Willem Dafoe and Anne Archer. The film debuted at number one in the box office, earning a reported $20.5 million on its opening weekend in the United States, and over $122 million in total box office revenue.

Later in 1994, de Almeida starred in the romantic comedy Only You, in which he played a suave Italian businessman named Giovanni. According to The New York Times, the film director and producer Norman Jewison said: "I interviewed many actors for the role.... There was one Italian actor, fairly prominent, that I met in L.A. and again in New York and in Rome. And I wanted to meet several other Italian actors in Italy." When the production moved from Pittsburgh to Italy last fall, however, none of the country's actors seemed right for what Jewison called "the clichéd Italian gigolo, the guy that women from the Midwest always meet." After the interview with de Almeida, Jewison recalled: "Howard Feuer, the casting director, said, 'Joaquim's not that tall. He's not that handsome. He's no Rossano Brazzi here.' I said, 'But listen to his voice.' There's a machoness. Especially when he lowers it, whispers, leans across the table and pours you another glass of wine. He can be extremely intimate with his voice."

In 1995, de Almeida appeared with Antonio Banderas and Salma Hayek in the Robert Rodriguez's action thriller Desperado. This film is the sequel to Rodriguez's independent film El Mariachi and the second entry in the Mexico Trilogy. Joaquim de Almeida portrays the main villain Bucho, a wealthy but casually bloodthirsty drug kingpin, who rules a seedy Mexican border town. De Almeida replaced Raúl Juliá as Bucho, following Juliá's death in 1994. Desperado was screened out of competition at the 1995 Cannes Film Festival. He won a Portuguese Golden Globe for Best Actor in his next film, the 1995 Portuguese drama Adão e Eva (Adam and Eve), where he played the main female character career rival Francisco.

In 1997 he appeared in the miniseries Nostromo and starred in the Luís Galvão Teles' drama Elles (Women). The following year, he co-starred with Eric Roberts in the Jack Perez thriller La Cucaracha (1998). The film premiered at the Austin Film Festival where it won the Feature Film Award.

=== 2000s ===
In 2001, de Almeida starred in the Brazilian comedy O Xangô de Baker Street, where he plays the legendary British detective Sherlock Holmes. The film is based on a book written in 1995 by celebrated Brazilian author/actor/entrepreneur Jô Soares about a case involving Sherlock Holmes and his loyal friend Doctor Watson, who are invited to Brazil by its Emperor, Pedro II, to find the thief of a priceless Stradivarius owned by his lover. De Almeida's outstanding portrayal of the iconic fictional character earned him another Portuguese Golden Globe for best actor, his third, and was nominated for Cinema Brazil Grand Prize award for best actor. In 2001, he had a supporting role in the war film Behind Enemy Lines as Admiral Juan Miguel Piquet, the commander of NATO's naval forces, starring alongside Owen Wilson and Gene Hackman. The film, based on the shootdown of Scott O'Grady, is centered on the story of an American naval flight officer, played by Owen Wilson, who was shot down over Bosnia, who ends up uncovering a massacre during the Bosnian War.

In 2004, he starred with Daryl Hannah and Denise Richards in Yo Puta, a gritty docu-style prostitution tale — in which interviews with real-life prostitutes are interspersed – that is based on a bestselling book by Spaniard Isabel Pisano that tracks the slow descent of a girl into the sex business.

That same year, he joined the cast of 24 as Ramon Salazar, the ruthless leader of a drug cartel who is put into—and later broken out of—prison by Jack Bauer. In 2007, Joaquim de Almeida limns a brutal foreman named Baxter, in the Antonio Cuadri's El corazón de la tierra, a heady romance with a social conscience.

Later in 2004, de Almeida portrayed a Spanish-born photo journalist named Michael in the romantic drama La Cucina, a film about several mostly separated storylines in which couples, friends and associates meet for a night of cooking and befriending.

In 2008, he starred in Che: Part Two, a biographical film about the Argentine doctor-turned-international revolutionary Ernesto Guevara. De Almeida played President René Barrientos, a former Bolivian politician who served as his country's Vice President in 1964 and as its President from 1964 to 1969.

Later that year, de Almeida appeared in The Burning Plain as local man named Nick Martinez, starring alongside Charlize Theron and Kim Basinger. He also provided his voice for the animated show The Batman as the voice of the villain Bane, and reprised his role in all of his appearances in the show except one in which Ron Perlman voices the character for one line.

=== 2010s ===
On 16 July 2010, de Almeida was confirmed for the role of main antagonist Hernan Reyes in the 2011 action film Fast Five directed by Justin Lin and co-starring Vin Diesel, Paul Walker and Dwayne Johnson. The film took $3.8 million in receipts during launch midnight showings marking the best ever opening for a Universal title and Fast & Furious franchise. Fast Five became the highest-grossing film of 2011 for 15 days before being replaced on 30 May 2011.

Between 2013 and 2020, de Almeida starred in The Gilded Cage, Our Brand is Crisis, The Hitman's Bodyguard, and Downsizing.

Beginning in 2016, de Almeida starred for two seasons as the drug kingpin Don Epifanio Vargas in the USA Network crime drama Queen of the South, opposite Alice Braga. He garnered Imagen Awards nominations as Best Actor in both 2017 and 2018 for his portrayal of Don Epifanio, and after the character was killed by Braga's character in the last episode of Season Two, Almeida also appeared during Season Three. The show wrapped up its 5th season in 2021.

== Selected filmography ==
=== Films ===
Year	Title	Role	Notes
1983	The Honorary Consul	Leon	Movie nominated for two BAFTA Film Awards.
1987	Good Morning, Babylon	Andrea Bonanno	Movie presented in 1987 Cannes Film Festival.
1990	Sandino	Augusto César Sandino	
1994	Clear and Present Danger	Col. Felix Cortez	Movie nominated for two Academy Awards.
1994	Only You	Giovanni	
1995	Desperado	Cesar "Bucho"	Movie presented in 1995 Cannes Film Festival.
1995	Sostiene Pereira	Manuel	
1998	Dollar for the Dead	Friar Ramon	
2001	La voz de su amo	Oliveira	
2001	O Xangô de Baker Street	Sherlock Holmes	
2001	Behind Enemy Lines	Admiral Juan Miguel Piquet	
2003	Il Fuggiasco	Lolo	
2006	The Celestine Prophecy	Father Sanchez	
2008	The Burning Plain	Nick Martinez	
2008	Che	René Barrientos	
2011	Fast Five	Hernan Reyes	
2013	The Gilded Cage	José Ribeiro	"People's Choice Award" at the 26th European Film Awards.
2014	Of Mind and Music	Dr. Alvaro Cruz	
2015	Our Brand is Crisis	Pedro Castillo	
2016	A Date with Miss Fortune	Jose	
2017	The Hitman's Bodyguard	Jean Foucher	
2020	Fatima	Father Ferreira	
2018	Downsizing	Dr. Oswaldo Pereira	
2023	Missing	Javi	
2023	Fast X	Hernan Reyes	Cameo appearance
2023	The Palace	Dr. Lima	
2024	Road House	The Sheriff	
2026	Hungry †	Walker	
TBA	O Último Animal	Ciro	Post-production

=== Television series ===
Year	Title	Role	Notes
1985	Miami Vice	Nico Arroyo	Episode: "Bought and Paid For"
1996–1997	Nostromo	Col. Sotillo	
1999	Camino de Santiago	Gonzalo Leyva	
2003–2004	24	Ramon Salazar	
2004	The West Wing	Carlos Carrio	S5: Ep12 "Slow News Day"
2004	The Batman	Bane	Voice; Episode: Traction
2005	Wanted	Captain Manuel Valenza	
2012	Archer	Roman Calzado	S3: Ep5 "El Contador"
2012	The Mentalist	Gabriel Porchetto	
2013	Bones	Raphael Valenza	S9 Ep7 "The Nazi on the Honeymoon"
2016–2018	Queen of the South	Don Epifanio Vargas	
2017	Training Day	Menjivar	
2020–2022	Warrior Nun	Cardinal Duretti	
2021	Aruanas	Robert Johnson	
2022	Now and Then	Bernie	
2023	Ganglands	Bucho	Season 2, 6 episodes (French title: Braqueurs)
2024	Shōgun	Father Domingo	

== Awards and nominations ==
Year	Ceremony	Award	Film/TV Show	Result
1994	Cairo International Film Festival	Cairo International Film Festival Award for Best Actor	Retrato de Família	Won
1995	Portuguese Golden Globes	Golden Globe for Best Actor	Adão e Eva	Won
1997	Portuguese Golden Globes	Golden Globe for Best Actor	Sostiene Pereira	Nominated
1998	Portuguese Golden Globes	Golden Globe for Best Actor	Tentação	Won
2000	Portuguese Golden Globes	Golden Globe for Best Actor	Inferno	Nominated
2002	Cinema Brazil Grand Prize	Cinema Brazil Grand Prize for Best Actor	O Xangô de Baker Street	Nominated
2002	Portuguese Golden Globes	Golden Globe for Best Actor	O Xangô de Baker Street	Won
2004	Festival Cinema de Badajoz	Career Award	–	Won
2005	Screen Actors Guild Awards	Outstanding Performance by an Ensemble in a Drama Series	24	Nominated
2006	Portuguese Golden Globes	Golden Globe for Best Actor	Um Tiro no Escuro	Nominated
2008	Avanca Film Festival	Avanca Film Festival Award for Best Actor	Óscar. Una pasión surrealista	Won
2009	Festival de Cine Iberoamericano de Huelva	Prize of the City of Huelva	–	Won
