= Royal Portuguese Cabinet of Reading =

Central library in Rio de Janeiro, Brazil

Real Gabinete Português de Leitura
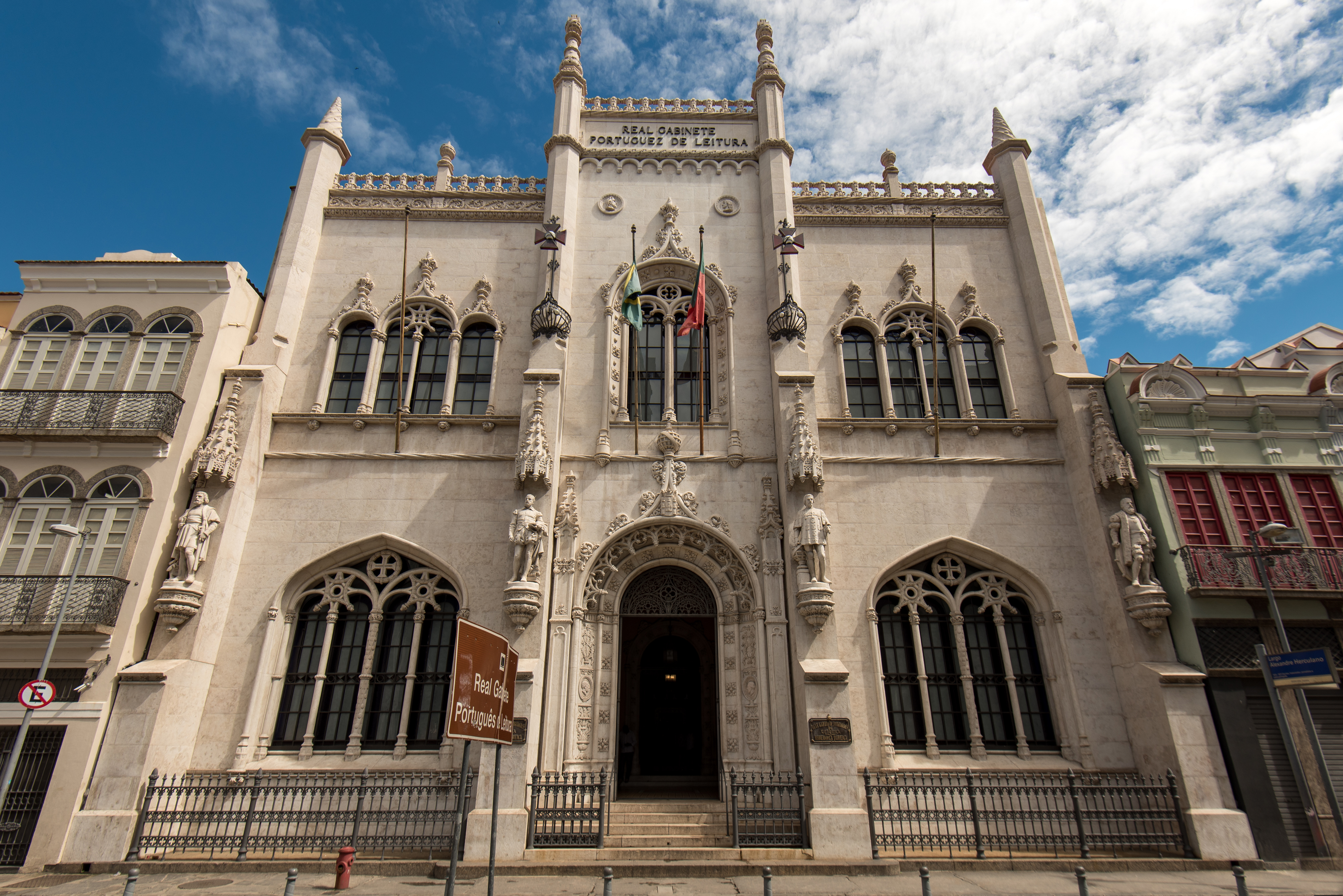
- Royal Cabinet's façade
- 22.9053°S 43.1822°W
- Location: Rio de Janeiro, Brazil
- Established: 14 May 1837; 189 years ago

Collection
- Size: 350,000 Items

Access and use
- Population served: open to the public

Other information
- Director: Antonio Gomes da Costa

The Royal Portuguese Cabinet of Reading (Portuguese: Real Gabinete Português de Leitura) is a library and lusophone cultural institution, is located in Luís de Camões Street, number 30, in the center of the city of Rio de Janeiro, Brazil. It is listed by the State Institute of Cultural Heritage. Elected the fourth most beautiful library in the world by Time magazine, the Cabinet has the largest collection of Portuguese literature outside Portugal.

== History ==
The institution was founded in 1837 by a group of forty-three Portuguese immigrants, political refugees, to promote culture among the Portuguese community in the then capital of the Empire of Brazil. It was the first association of this community in the city.

The building of the current headquarters, designed by the Portuguese architect Rafael da Silva e Castro, was erected between 1880 and 1887 in Neo-Manueline style. This architectural style evokes the exuberant Gothic-Renaissance style in force at the time of the Portuguese discoveries, named Manueline in Portugal for having coincided with the reign of King Manuel (1495–1521).

The Emperor Pedro II (1831–1889) laid the cornerstone of the building on 10 June 1880, and his daughter, Isabel, Princess Imperial of Brazil, together with her husband, the Prince Gaston, Count of Eu, inaugurated it on 10 September 1887.

=== Architecture ===
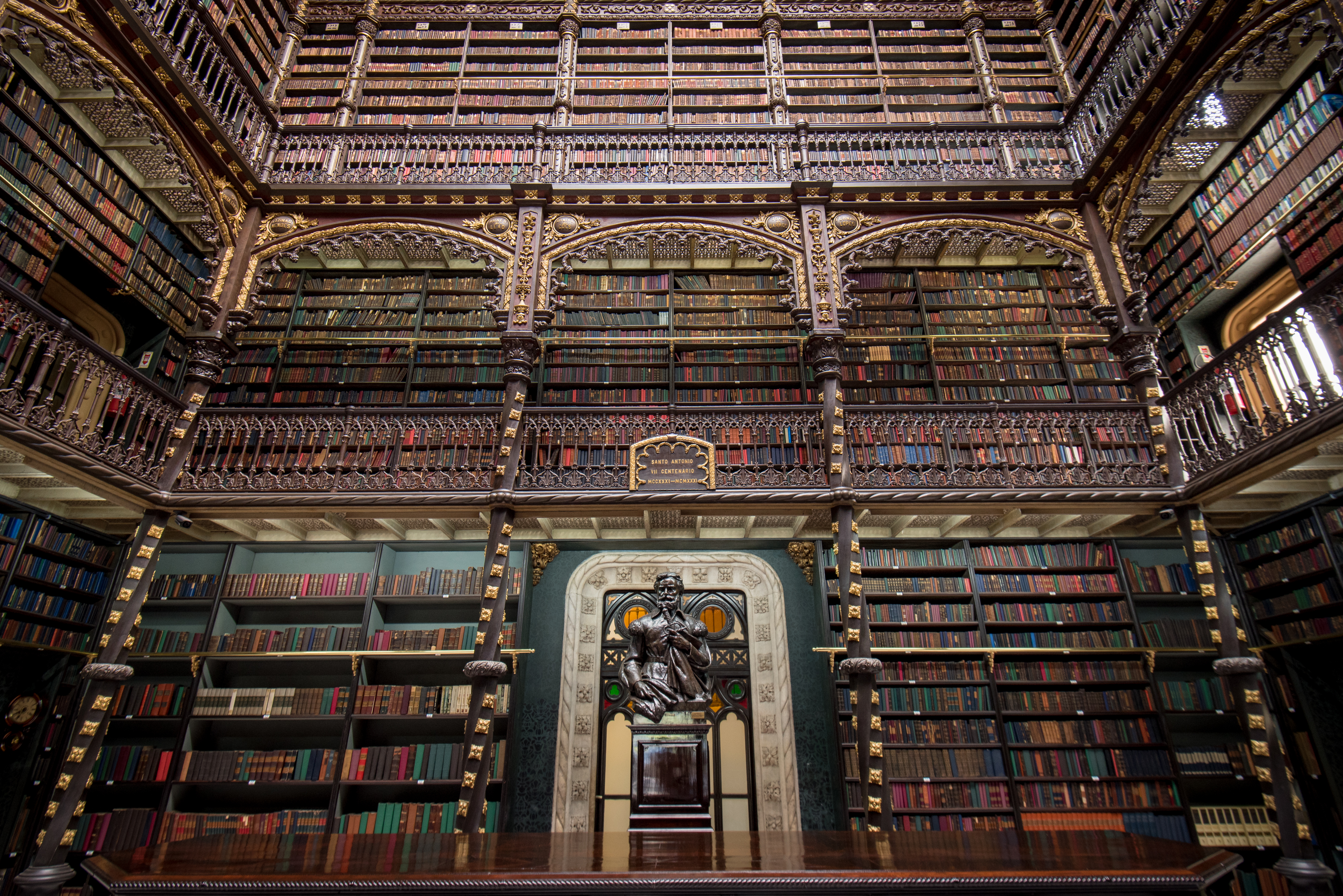
Reading room

The façade, inspired by the Jerónimos Monastery in Lisbon, was worked by Germano José Salle in lisbon stone in Lisbon and brought by ship to Rio. The four statues that adorn it portray respectively Pedro Álvares Cabral, Luís de Camões, Infante D. Henrique and Vasco da Gama. The medallions of the facade portray, respectively, the writers Fernão Lopes, Gil Vicente, Alexandre Herculano and Almeida Garrett.

The interior also follows the Neo-Manueliene style on the covers, wooden bookcases for books and memorials. The ceiling of the Reading Room has a beautiful chandelier and a skylight in iron structure, the first example of this type of architecture in Brazil. The hall also has a beautiful monument of silver, ivory and marble (the Altar of the Homeland), of 1.7 meters of height, that celebrates the time of the discoveries, realized in the Casa Reis & Filhos in Porto by the goldsmith António Maria Ribeiro, and acquired in 1923 by the Royal Cabinet.

=== Public and works ===
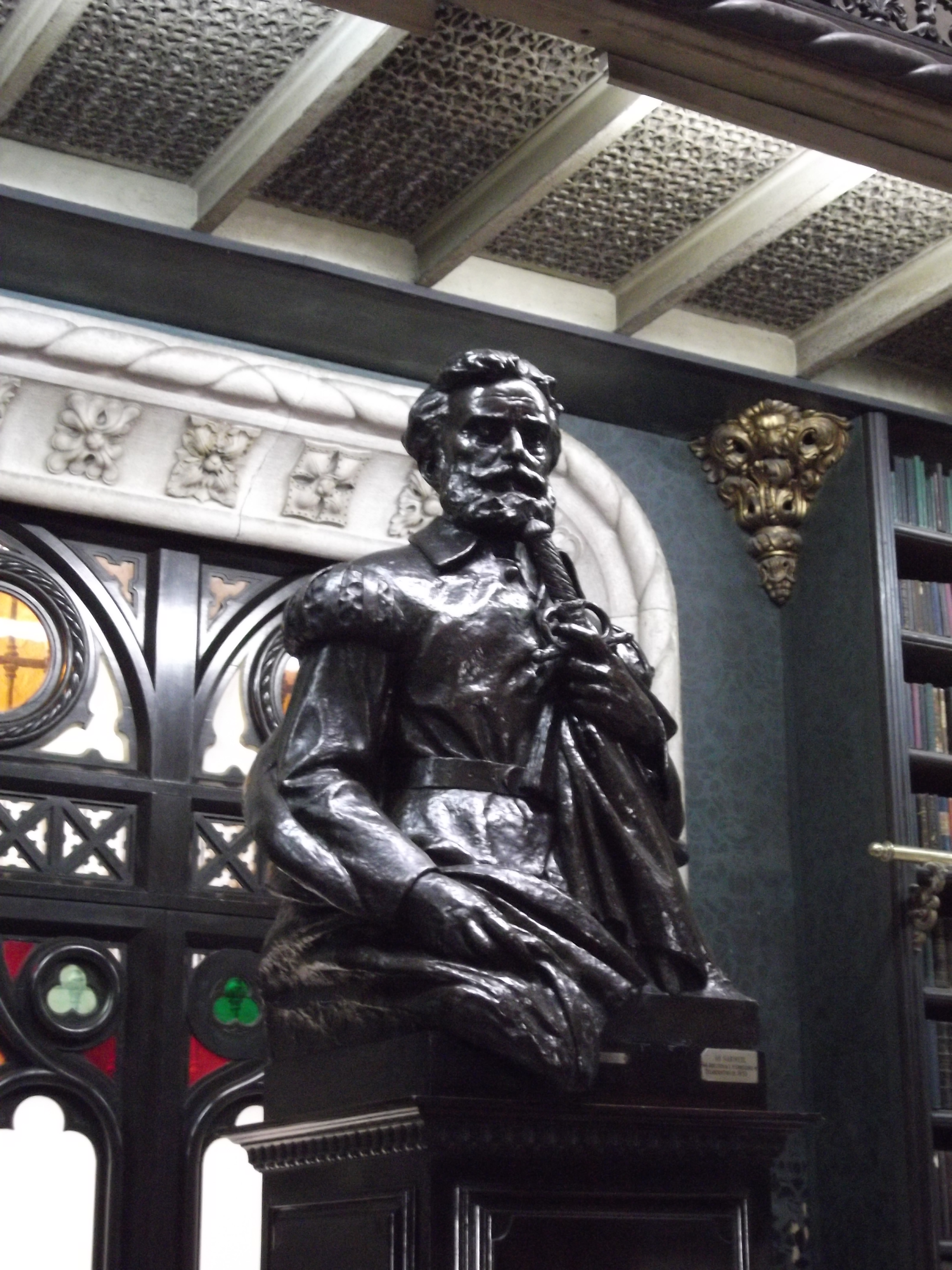
Pedro Álvares Cabral's statue

Open to the public since 1900, the library of the Royal Cabinet has the largest collection of Portuguese works outside Portugal. Among the 350,000 volumes, both national and foreign, are rare works such as a copy of the "princeps" edition of Os Lusíadas of Camões (1572), the Ordinations of D. Manuel (1521), the Capitolos de Cortes and Leys (1539), Verdadeira informaçam das terras do Preste Joam, segundo vio e escreveo ho padre Francisco Alvarez (1540), a manuscript of the comedy "Tu, só tu, puro amor" by Machado de Assis, and many others. Every year, it receives about six thousand titles from Portugal. There is also an important collection of paintings by José Malhoa, Carlos Reis, Oswaldo Teixeira, Eduardo Malta and Henrique Medina. Every day, it receives, on average, one hundred and fifty visitors. Among its illustrious visitors, from the past, are the names of Machado de Assis, Olavo Bilac and João do Rio.

The Royal Cabinet publishes the magazine Convergência Lusíada (semester) and promotes courses on Literature, Portuguese Language, History, Anthropology and Arts, destined mainly for university students.

The history of the Brazilian Academy of Letters is linked to that of the Royal Cabinet, since the first five solemn sessions of the academy, under the presidency of Machado de Assis, were held here.

=== Titles and honors ===
On 5 July 1946 it was made an Officer of the Military Order of Christ. On 19 August 1947, it was made Commander of the Order of Benemerence, on 9 April 1981 it was elevated to Honorary Member of the Military Order of Christ and on 13 July 1990 was made Honorary Member of the Military Order of Saint James of the Sword.

In July 2014 the library was listed in 4th place among the 20 most beautiful libraries in the world according to Time magazine. The publication highlighted its history, architecture and rich collection of lusophone works.

== Gallery ==
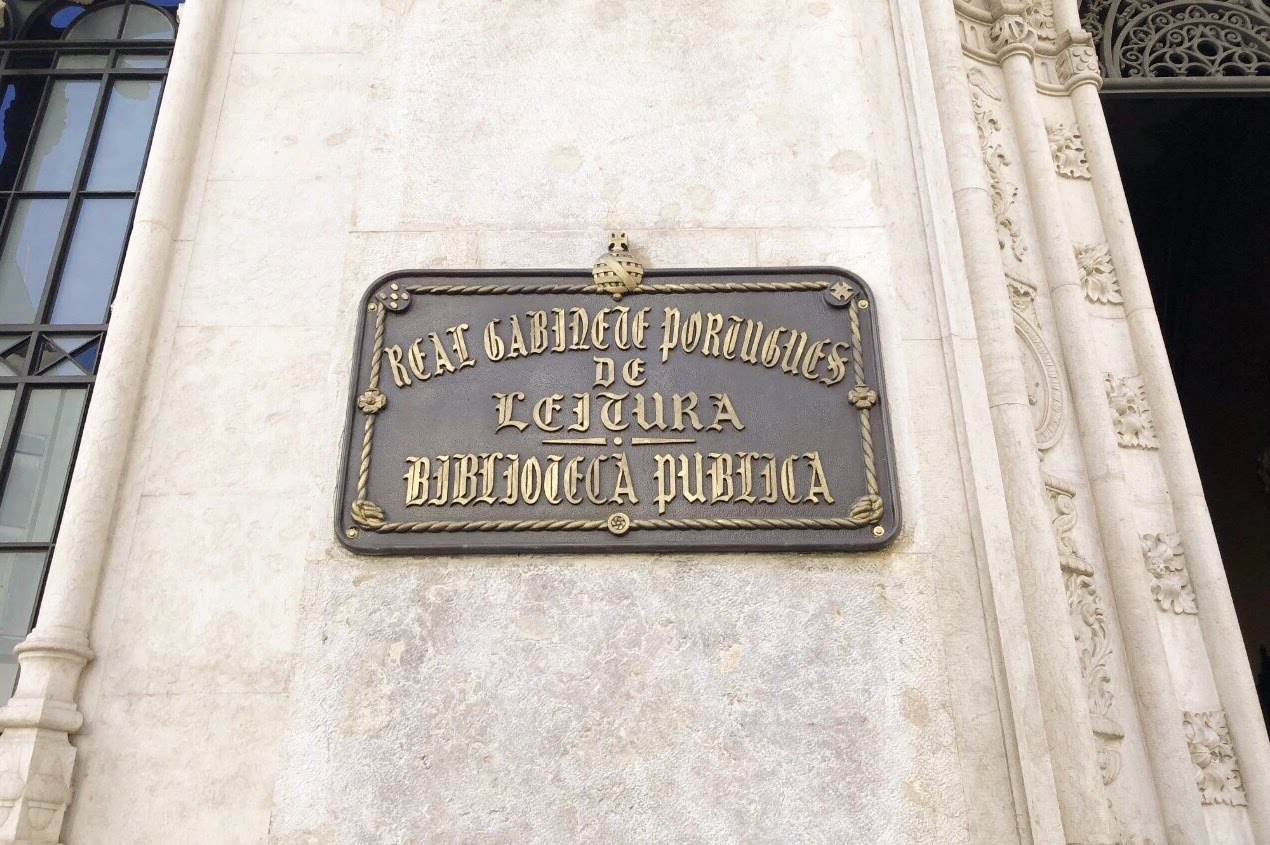
Royal Cabinet's plaque

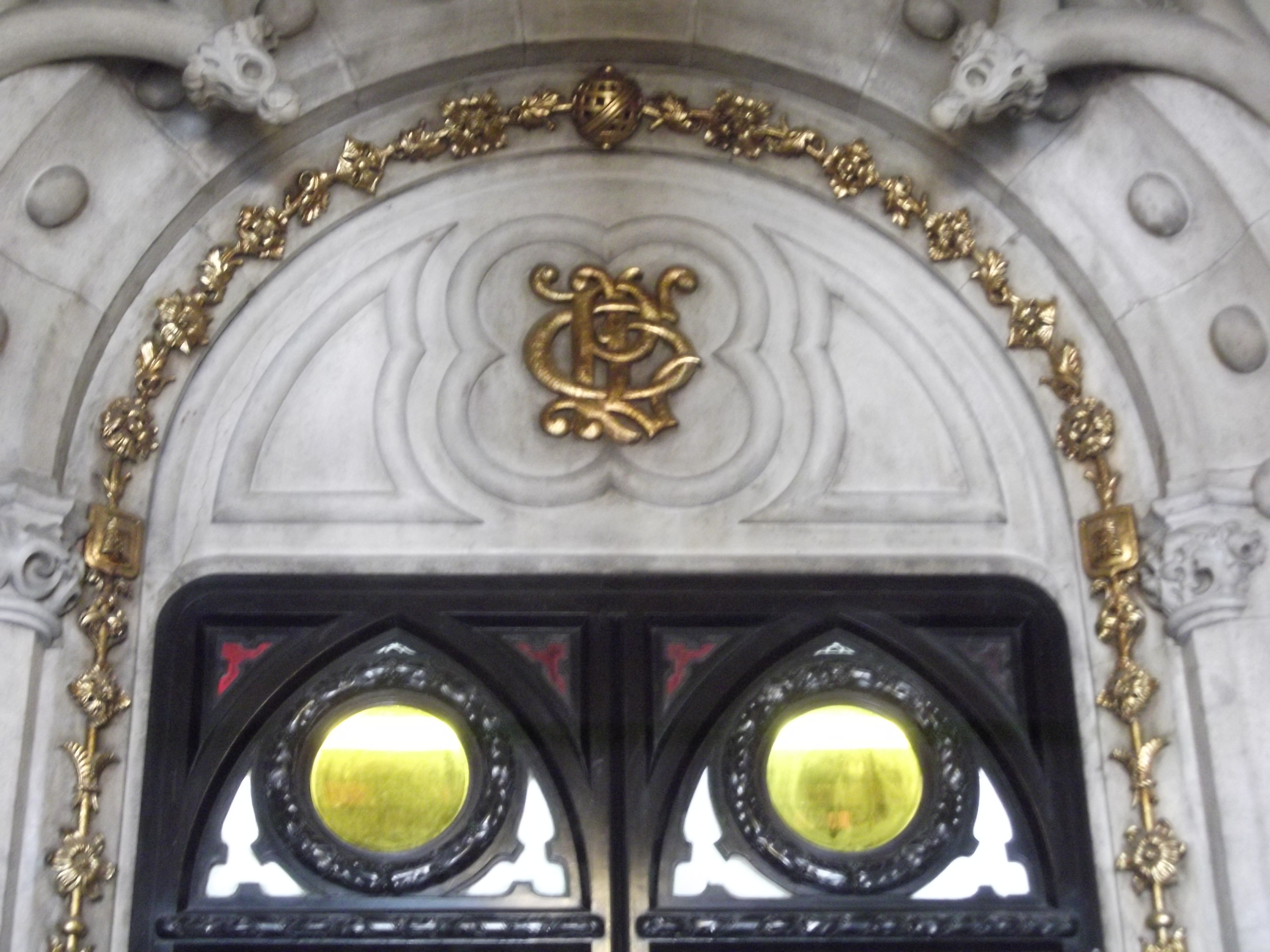
Royal Cabinet's monogram

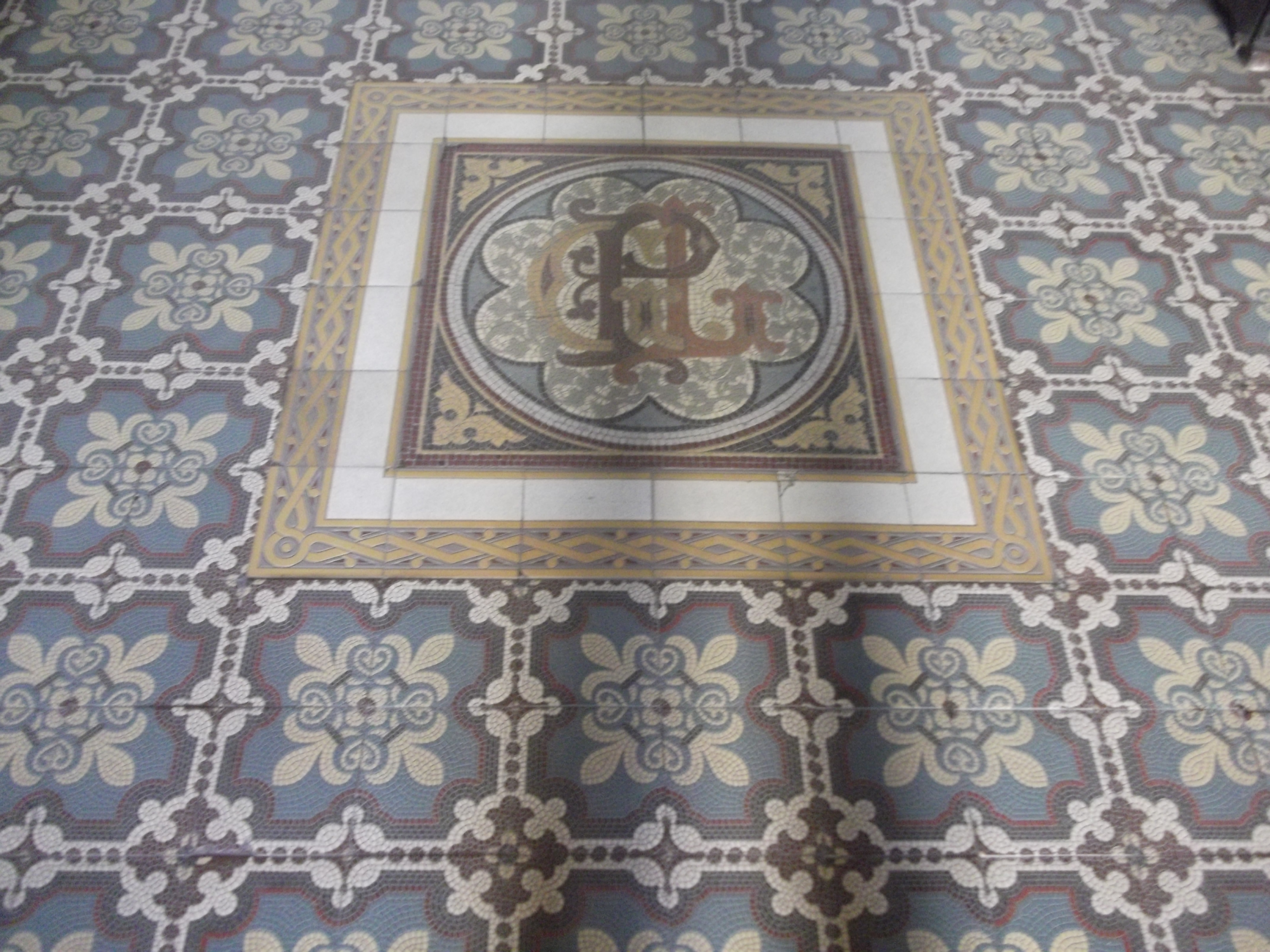
Floor with the Royal Cabinet's logo

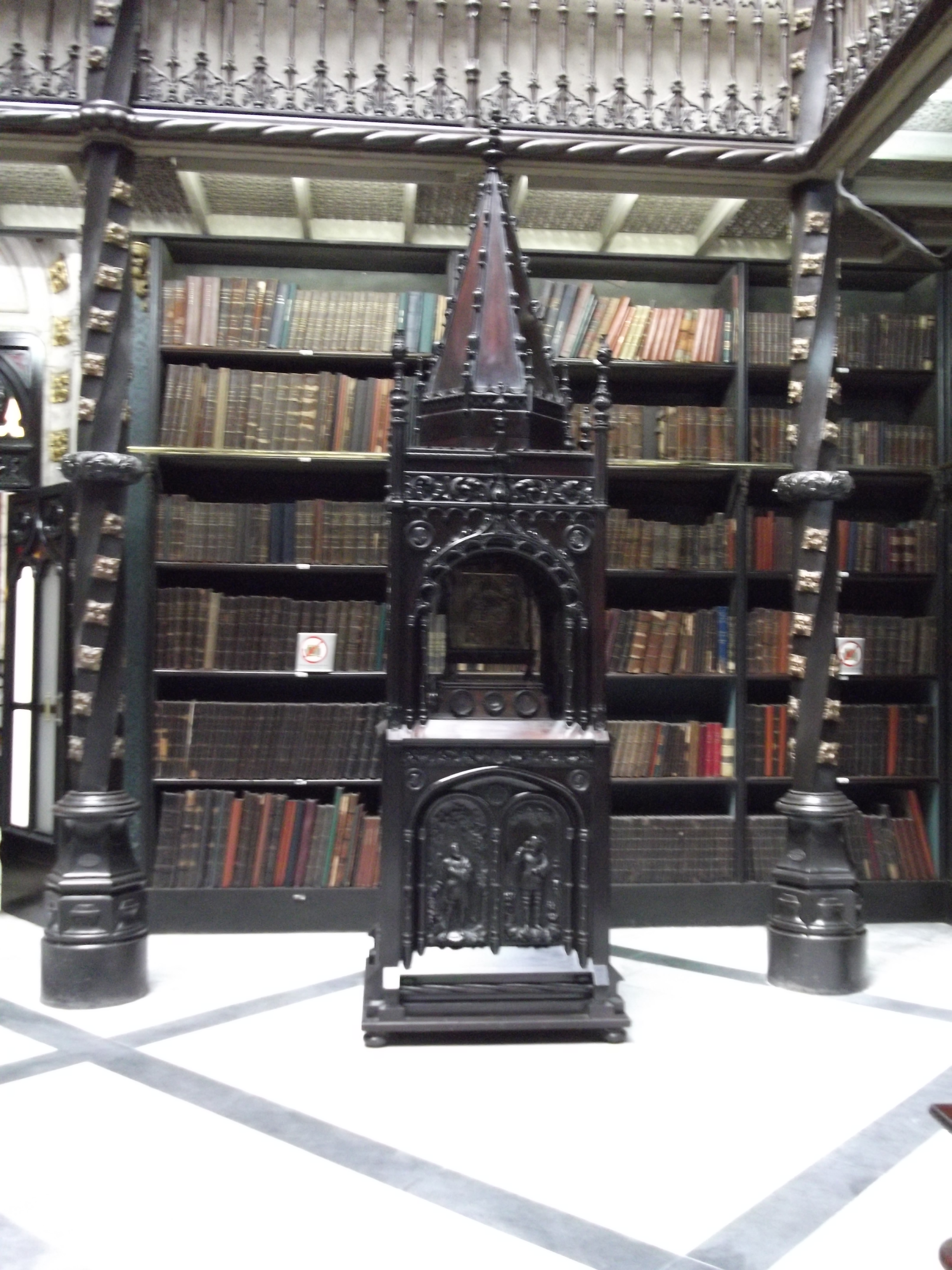
Room's warehouse

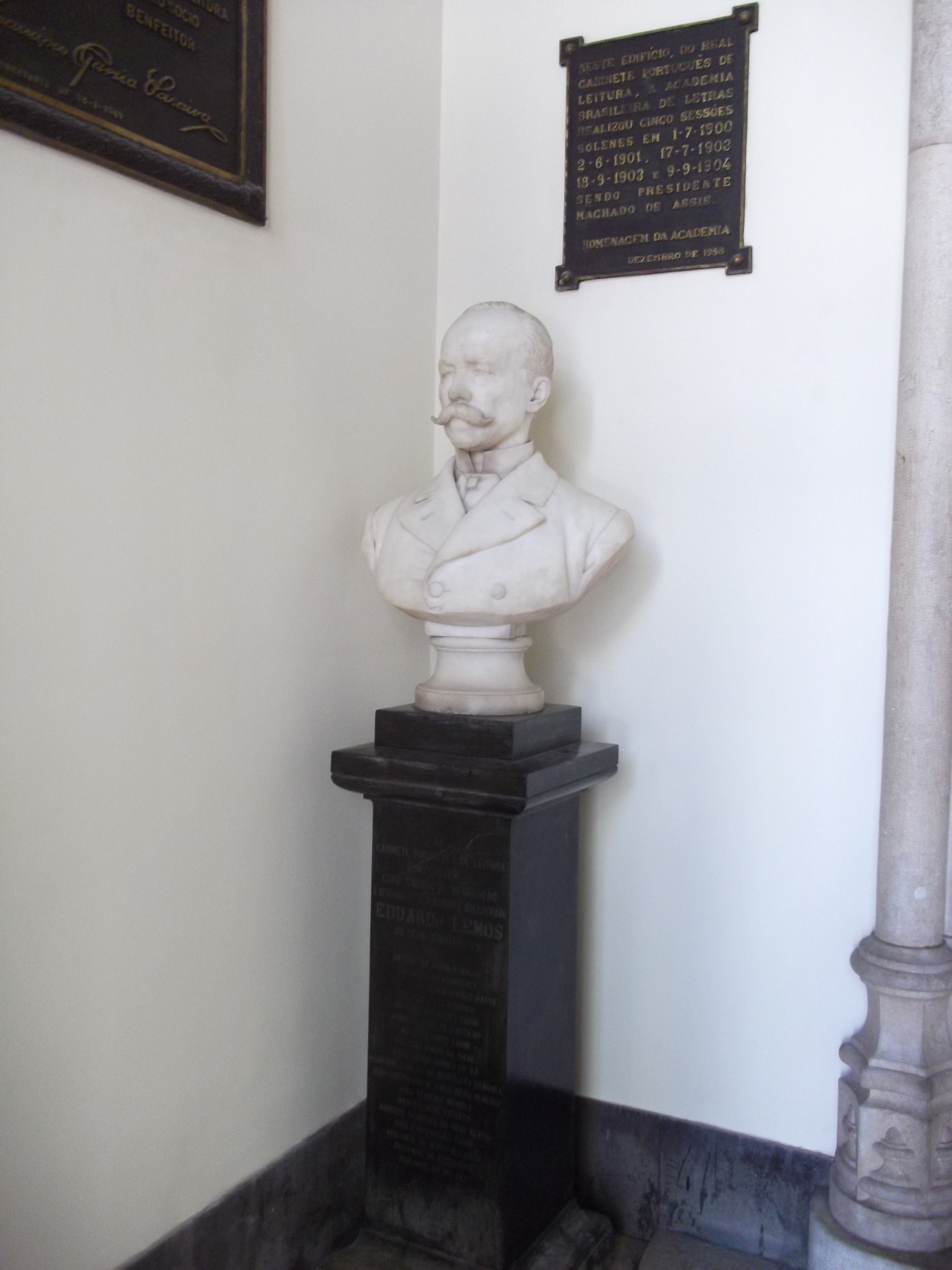
Eduardo Lemos' bust

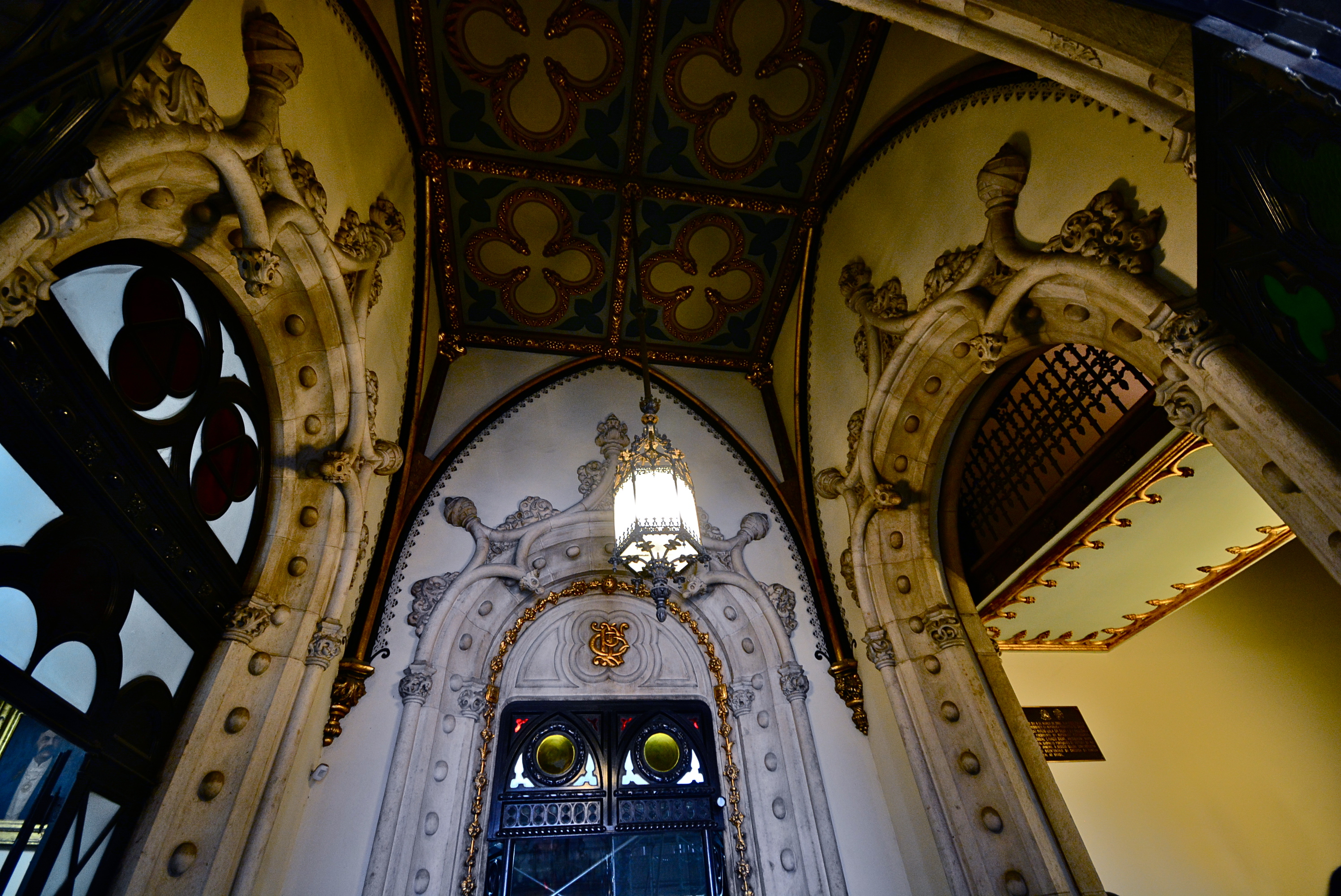
Architecture details

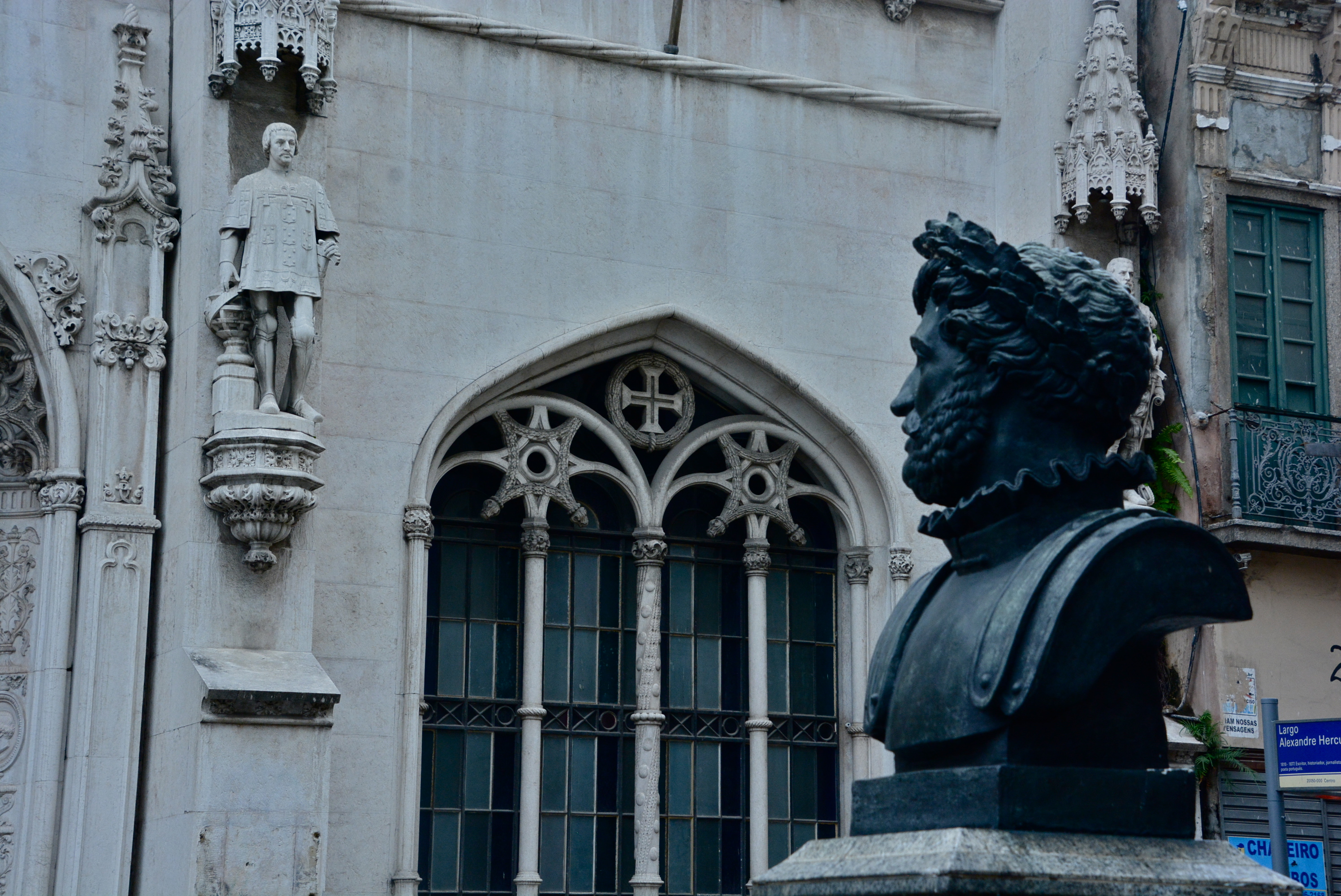
Statues and bust of Luís de Camões at the façade

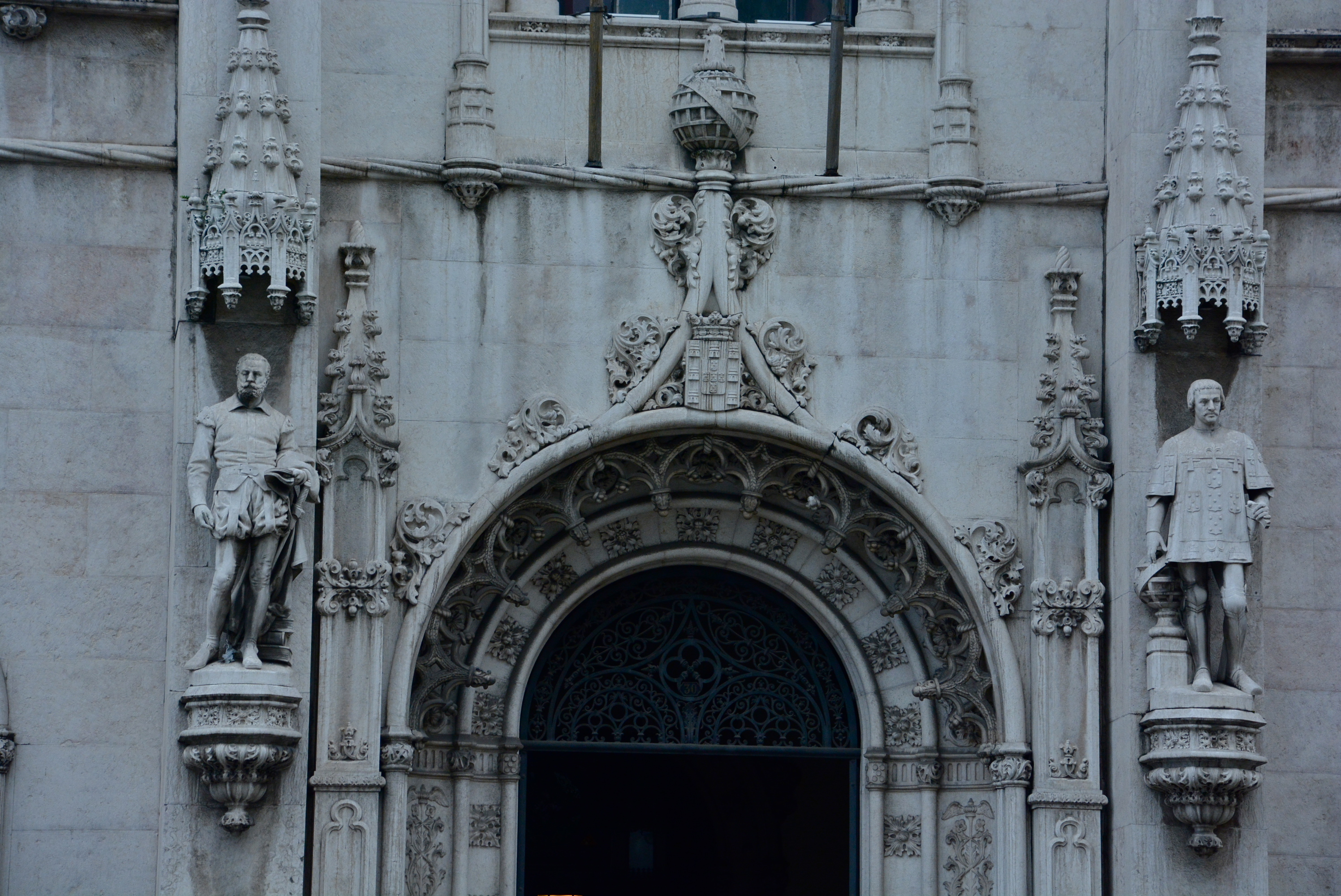
Façade statues of Camões and Prince Henry the Navigator

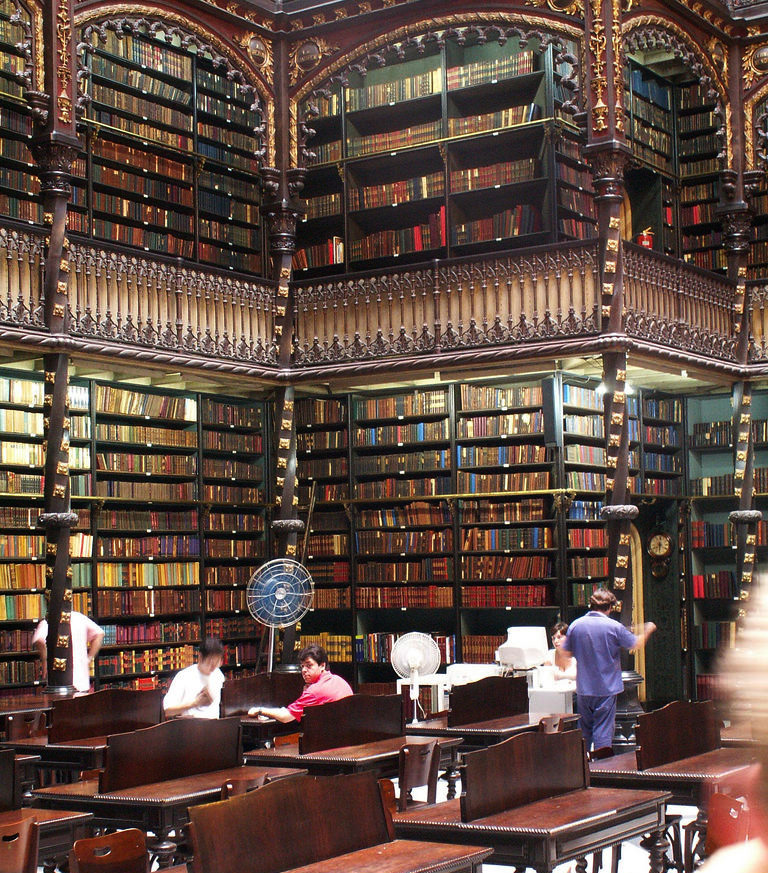
Reading room

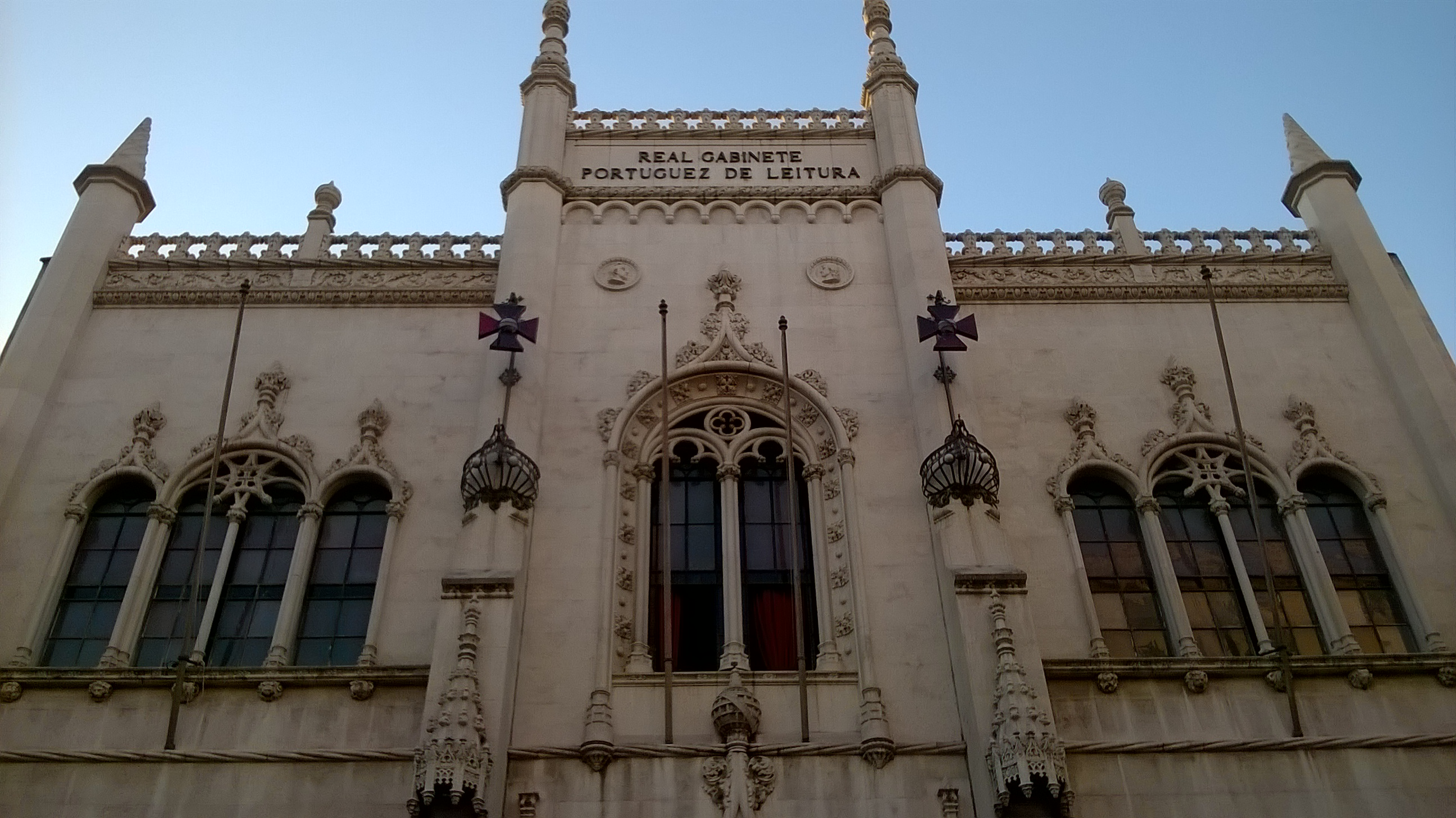
Building upper façade details

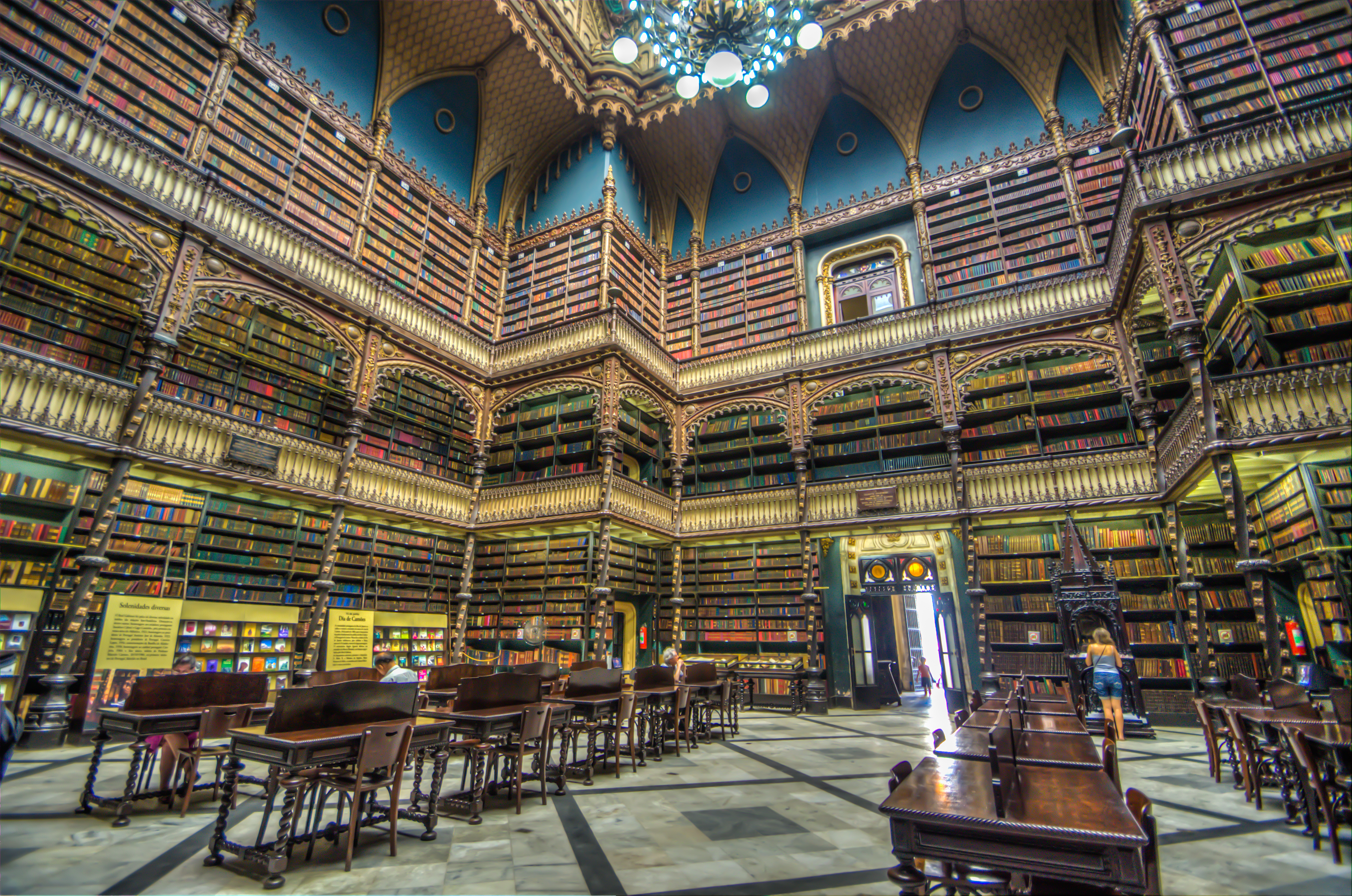
Reading room

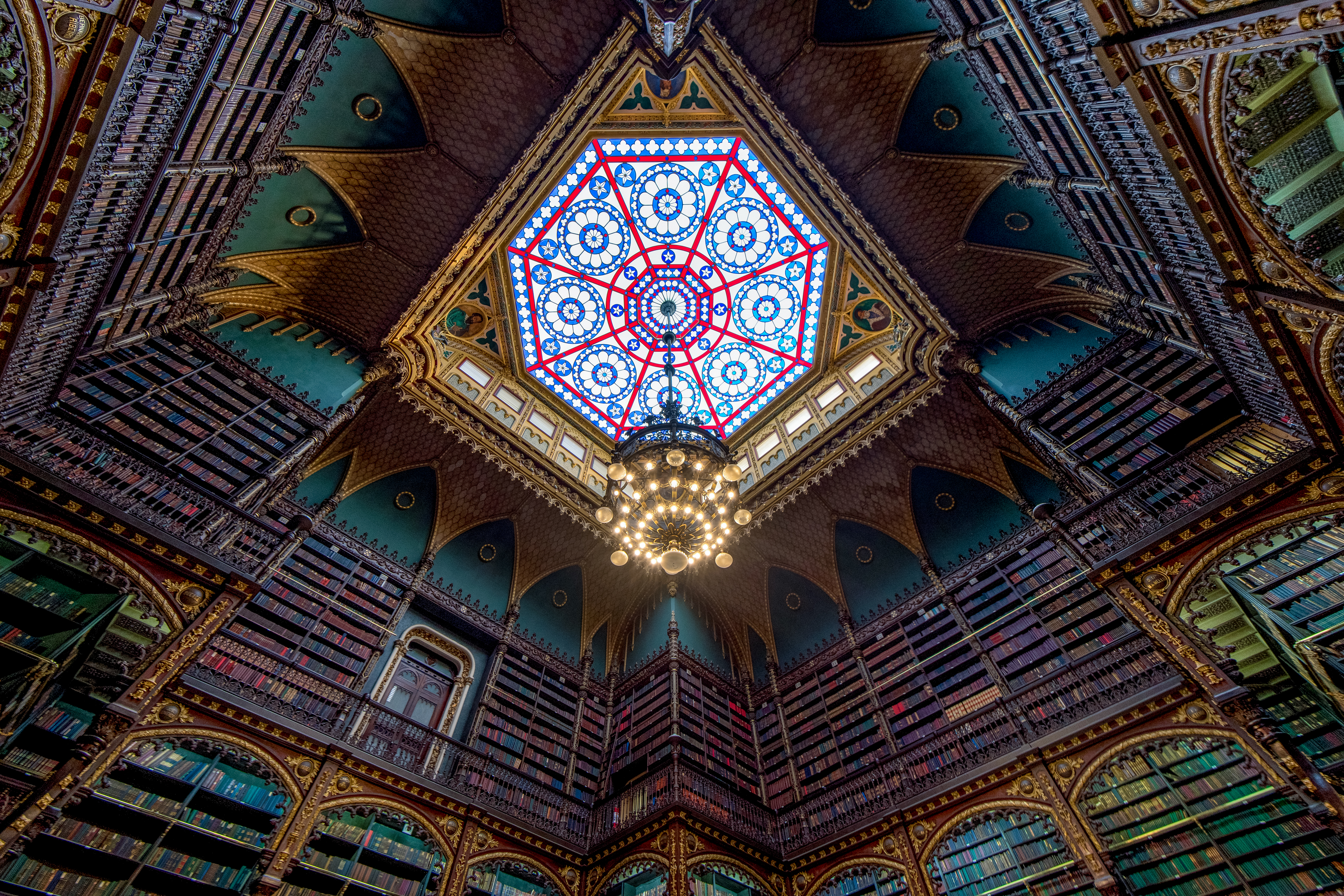
Stained glass dome with chandelier

== In popular culture ==
The historic building was used as a setting for films, soap operas and television specials such as:

- Primo Basílio (1988), by Daniel Filho
- Os Maias (2001), by Luiz Fernando Carvalho
- A Samba for Sherlock (2001), by Miguel Faria Jr.
- Mad Maria (2005), by Ricardo Waddington
- Vinicius (2005), by Miguel Faria Jr.

== See also ==
- List of libraries in Brazil
