= A Samba for Sherlock (novel) =

Book by Jô Soares

O Xangô de Baker Street
- Author: Jô Soares
- Translator: Clifford E. Landers
- Language: Portuguese
- Genre: Mystery novel, historic fiction, comedy
- Published: 1995 (Portuguese)
- Publisher: Companhia das Letras
- Publication place: Brazil
- English publication date: 1997
- ISBN: 8571644829

A Samba for Sherlock (Portuguese:O Xangô de Baker Street) is a novel by Brazilian comedian, writer and television presenter Jô Soares.

== Plot ==
In 1886, the French diva Sarah Bernhardt came to Brazil to perform. The public bows to Sarah's talent, including Emperor Dom Pedro II, who tells her a secret: a valuable Stradivarius violin, a gift from Baroness Maria Luiza, has mysteriously disappeared. Sarah then suggests that the emperor invite the famous detective Sherlock Holmes to investigate the case. Dom Pedro II accepts the advice and soon the English detective agrees to travel to Brazil to solve this mystery.

At the same time, a murder shocks the city and leaves Chief Mello Pimenta in a panic. A prostitute had been murdered and had her ears severed and a violin string placed on her body by the killer. While the deputy searches for clues, Holmes and Watson disembark.

Sherlock Holmes, Dr. Watson and police chief Mello Pimenta walk the streets of the Brazilian capital looking for information to discover the mystery of the violin and find the perpetrator of the crimes that are shocking the city.

Throughout the course of the story, the fashions and customs of the imperial capital in the 19th century are accompanied by some bolder assumptions, such as that Brazil was the birthplace of history's first serial killer. In turn, the text goes from the playfulness of the dialogues and the enjoyment of Brazilian Frenchism at the time to the hilarious of several scenes, with revelations about the food, pharmacological and sexual life of the famous detective on Baker Street.

== Adaptation ==
The book was adapted into a film in 2001, directed by Miguel Faria Jr.
