= La Cucaracha (1998 film) =

1998 American film by Jack Perez

- La Cucaracha DVD cover
- Directed by: Jack Perez
- Written by: James McManus
- Starring: Eric Roberts; Joaquim de Almeida; Victor Rivers; James McManus; Tara Crespo; Michael Peña
- Cinematography: Shawn Maurer
- Edited by: John Pace
- Music by: Marty Davich; Alvaro Gomez Orozco
- Distributed by: Paramount Home Entertainment; Renascent Films; Atmosphere Entertainment Inc. Flashpoint ltd
- Release dates: May 14, 1998 (Cannes Film Festival); October 1, 1998 (Austin Film Festival); April 23, 1999 (U.S.)
- Running time: 95 minutes
- Country: United States
- Language: English
- Budget: US $3 million
- Box office: $14,692 (domestic)

La Cucaracha is a 1998 American film directed by Jack Perez and starring Eric Roberts and Joaquim de Almeida. The film follows the story of Walter Pool (Eric Roberts), a down on his luck wannabe novelist, who receives an offer of $100,000 to kill an alleged child killer. Walter needs the money desperately for many reasons, not the least of which is the fact that he is infatuated with a local woman and he feels as though he has nothing to offer to her. He accepts the offer only to find out that the task of killing another human being is much more difficult than he thought, especially when it turns out that his intended victim is not really a child killer.

The film premiered on May 14, 1998, at the Austin Film Festival where it won the Feature Film Award.

It received some positive reviews scoring 67% as of February 9, 2010 on the aggregate review website Rotten Tomatoes. Film critic Roger Ebert of the Chicago Sun-Times awarded La Cucaracha three stars out of four calling it an "intriguing, stylish little film". Marc Savlov of The Austin Chronicle awarded the film three and a half stars praising "McManus' brilliant screenplay" and calling the film a "minor gem".
