= Programa do Jô =

Talk show hosted by Jô Soares broadcast by Rede Globo

- Genre: Comedy
- Based on: Jô Soares Onze e Meia, de Carlos Roberto
- Directed by: Willem van Weerelt; Alexandre Ishikawa
- Presented by: Jô Soares
- Narrated by: Jacarelvis
- Country of origin: Brazil
- Original language: Portuguese
- No. of seasons: 16

Production
- Executive producer: Flávio Nascimento

Original release
- Network: Rede Globo
- Release: April 3, 2000 – December 16, 2016

Related
- The Noite com Danilo Gentili (2014-2023)

Programa do Jô (Portuguese for Jô's Show) was a Brazilian late-night talk show broadcast by Rede Globo from April 3, 2000 to December 16, 2016. It was shown after the late-night news bulletin, Jornal da Globo. the Show is back from July 24, 2023, to (Portuguese: Temporada 2023 do Programa do Jô).

The program was hosted by Brazilian comedian, author and musician Jô Soares. It began its life as Jô Soares Onze e Meia (Jô Soares Eleven Thirty) in 1988 on SBT. Following Jô Soares' return to Globo in 2000, the show was renamed as Programa do Jô, retaining the same format and late-night time slot.

The program's format was modeled after those of U.S. late-night talk shows, and usually featured interviews with three guests and a live musical performance. Usually, if one of the guests is a musician or band, they return to perform at the end of the show. There are also occasions when the first guest stays on to continue the interview past the first commercial break, in which case the show only features two interviews.

== Staff ==
Sexteto (The Sextet) are the show's house band. They usually perform in the beginning of the show, and during the commercial breaks. In the cases when there's no musical performance by a guest at the end of the show, the sextet (sometimes joined by Jô on the trumpet or bongos) also performs then. The bassist of the group, Bira, is known for his loud and long laughter, and has long been the target of most Jô's jokes.

A Chilean waiter, Luis Alexander Rubio Bernardes, known simply as Alex, serves drinks (and sometimes food) to the guests and is also mocked frequently by Jô for his "incompetence" (often for things completely out of Alex's control).

== See also ==
- List of programs broadcast by TV Globo
