= Mortal Sin (film) =

1970 film

- Film poster
- Directed by: Miguel Faria Jr.
- Written by: Miguel Faria Jr.
- Produced by: Gustavo Dahl; Miguel Faria Jr.
- Starring: Fernanda Montenegro
- Release date: 1970
- Running time: 70 minutes
- Country: Brazil
- Language: Portuguese

Mortal Sin (Portuguese: Pecado Mortal) is a 1970 Brazilian drama film written and directed by Miguel Faria Jr. The film was selected as the Brazilian entry for the Best Foreign Language Film at the 43rd Academy Awards, but was not accepted as a nominee.

== Cast ==
- Fernanda Montenegro as Fernanda
- José Lewgoy as José
- Renato Machado as Renato
- Anecy Rocha as Anecy
- Rejane Medeiros as Rejane
- Suzana de Moraes as Suzana
- Marina Montini
- Ivan Pontes

== See also ==
- List of submissions to the 43rd Academy Awards for Best Foreign Language Film
- List of Brazilian submissions for the Academy Award for Best Foreign Language Film
