= Whore (2004 film) =

- Film poster
- Spanish: Yo, puta
- Directed by: María Lidón
- Written by: Adela Ibañez; Isabel Pisano
- Produced by: Dolo Magan; Jose Magan
- Starring: Daryl Hannah; Denise Richards; Joaquim de Almeida
- Cinematography: Ricardo Aronovich
- Edited by: Bernat Vilaplana
- Music by: Javier Navarrete
- Distributed by: DeAPlaneta
- Release date: 7 May 2004
- Running time: 87 min.
- Country: Spain
- Language: English
- Budget: $6,000,000 (estimated)

Whore (Spanish: Yo, puta, lit. 'I, Whore'), also known as The Life, is a 2004 film directed by María Lidón which stars Daryl Hannah, Denise Richards, and Joaquim de Almeida. It is based on the 2003 book Yo puta by Isabel Pisano.

== Premise ==
The film adopts a documentary-like format to tell about the life of prostitutes in various cities of the world.

== Cast ==
- Daryl Hannah as Adriana
- Denise Richards as Rebecca
- Joaquim de Almeida as Pierre

== Reception ==
Ronnie Scheib of Variety deemed the film−"a popumentary on whoredom"−to be a "a mixture of fact and fiction that plays fast and loose with both".

== See also ==
- List of Spanish films of 2004
