= Jack Perez =

American film director

- Born: United States
- Occupations: Film director, screenwriter
- Notable work: Some Guy Who Kills People; Mega Shark Versus Giant Octopus

Jack Perez is an American film and television director, screenwriter and film professor. He directed the comedy-thriller Some Guy Who Kills People executive produced by John Landis. He also directed Mega Shark Versus Giant Octopus, whose trailer went viral, and was named by Yahoo! as one of the top 10 trailers of 2009, with more trailer views than Avatar.

His first feature film, "America’s Deadliest Home Video" (1991) was a groundbreaker in the found-footage field - an ahead-of-its-time application of the vérité-video form to the horror/crime genre.

He lives in Portland, Oregon.

== Filmography ==
Name	Year
America's Deadliest Home Video	1991
Hercules: The Legendary Journeys	1995
Xena: Warrior Princess (pilot)	1995
The Big Empty	1997
La Cucaracha	1998
Unauthorized Brady Bunch: The Final Days	2000
Unauthorized: The Mary Kay Letourneau Story	2000
Temptation Island	2001
Temptation Island 2	2002
Monster Island	2004
Wild Things 2	2004
666: The Child	2006
Mega Shark Versus Giant Octopus	2009
Polar Bear Payback (video game)	2010
T is for Tantrum (short film)	2011
Some Guy Who Kills People	2012
Blast Vegas	2013
The Family Lamp	2016
Where's Roman?	2017
Drone Wars	2017
Hyena	2021
