= Maggie Castle =

Canadian actress (born 1983)

- Born: August 7, 1983 (age 43); Montreal, Quebec
- Occupation: Actress
- Years active: 1990–present
- Family: Aimée Castle (sister)

Maggie Castle (born August 7, 1983) is a Canadian actress best known for her role as Jenny Kolinsky in cult horror comedy series Todd and the Book of Pure Evil. She was also the little girl, Amy Kramer, that battles the evil ventriloquist's dummy Slappy in the Goosebumps television series episode, Night of the Living Dummy II and voiced Molly MacDonald in the animated series Arthur. She has appeared in various other series such as Vampire High, The Grid and Beach Girls. Film roles include Weirdsville, Hank and Mike, The Time Traveler's Wife and Tumbledown.

== Early life ==
Maggie Castle was born in Montreal, Quebec, Canada. She studied radio and television production at Ryerson University. Castle's older sister is actress Aimée Castle, both appeared in Big Wolf on Campus.

== Career ==
=== Film ===
Castle made her film debut as a child actor in a small role in Vincent and Me (1990) (original title Vincent et moi).

Castle had a role in The 1997 thriller The Jackal, as the terrified child Maggie held at gun point by the film's titular assassin (Bruce Willis) in his climatic subway showdown with Declan Mulqueen (Richard Gere).

Released in 2006 was comedy drama The House with Castle playing Cindy, a member of a group of outcasts & misfits squatting in an old house. Directed by David Krae, shot in Toronto and Hamilton.

Weirdsville (2007) has Castle playing Treena, a member of a satanic cult that menaces the stoner protagonists of the dark comedy drama. Her and Greg Bryk's devil worshiping characters were noted as a standouts among the supporting cast in reviews. Supernatural slasher Dead Mary (2007), Castle plays Lily the younger girlfriend of one of a group of former college friends that reunite to spend a weekend at a lakeside cabin. When some of the party unintentionally summon the spirit of a witch by reciting her name three times in front of a mirror, possession and terror ensue. In the comedy horror film The Mad (2007) Castle plays Amy Hunt who's traveling with her father on a road trip when they encounter locals poisoned by tainted beef that causes an outbreak of zombie like symptoms in those infected.

2008's surreal comedy Hank and Mike followed the struggles of two Easter Bunnies after they are fired from their jobs, one of whom (Mike played by Paolo Mancini) has a crush on their co-worker Lena played by Castle. Though Mike is socially awkward and his fumbling attempts at a relationship with Lena are initially disastrous.

2009's romantic science fiction drama The Time Traveler's Wife Castle played Alicia Abshire the sister of Clare Abshire (played by Rachel McAdams).

After a successful Indiegogo campaign an animated feature film Todd and the Book of Pure Evil: The End of the End (2017) was created with Castle and her fellow cast-mates all returning to provide the voices. The animated feature provides a sort of third season the series never got and an ending to the cliffhanger it had gone out on.

=== Television ===
In the Goosebumps season one episode "Night of the Living Dummy II" (1996) she plays Amy Kramer, a young girl gifted a ventriloquist's dummy by her father. The doll, called Slappy, turns out to have a life of its own with evil intent and initial pranks escalate into it terrorising Amy and her family.

From 1997 to 2018 Castle provided the voice for tough, cut-off jean jacket wearing fourth grader Molly MacDonald on children's animated series Arthur.

2010 would see Castle in the role she is best known for, that of tough high schooler Jenny Kolinsky who, together with her three friends, fights supernatural evil in the cult horror comedy series Todd and the Book of Pure Evil. Castle was initially hesitant to audition for the role of Jenny Kolinsky when the series was casting because she was reluctant to play a high schooler while being in her twenties at the time, her initial indifference at the audition actually helped as it fit Jenny's character. Castle would return the next year when the show was renewed for a second season. In Disney Channel's romantic comedy Starstruck (2010) Castle plays Sara Olson, an obsessed fan of a teen pop idol Christopher Wilde (Sterling Knight), who drags her uninterested little sister Jessica Olson (Danielle Campbell) along to gatecrash a performance by him. This leads the younger sister and pop idol to cross paths and spend time with each other, eventually falling in love.

In the 2013 made for TV disaster movie Blast Vegas (AKA Destruction: Las Vegas) Castle played Olive who, together with Nelson (Frankie Muniz), find themselves fighting an ancient curse that's threatening to engulf Las Vegas in a destructive sandstorm.

== Filmography ==
=== Film ===
Year	Title	Role	Notes
1990	Vincent and Me	Crystal Tetley Jo's Sister	
1993	Because Why	Jackie	
1995	Kids of the Round Table	Jenny Ferguson	
1996	How the Toys Saved Christmas	Polly (English version, voice)	Animated film
1997	The Jackal	Maggie	
1998	Nico the Unicorn	Susie	
1999	Babel	Amanda	
2002	Edgar and Jane	Jane	Short film
2002	Arthur: It's Only Rock 'n' Roll	Molly MacDonald (voice)	Animated film
2003	Fast Food High	Maya	
2005	The Perfect Man	Wichita Girl	
2006	The Woods	Tracy	
2006	The House	Cindy	
2007	Weirdsville	Treena	
2007	Dead Mary	Lily	
2007	The Mad	Amy Hunt	
2007	I'm Not There	Another Girl	
2008	Hank and Mike	Lena	
2009	The Time Traveler's Wife	Alicia Abshire	
2010	Flying Lessons	Shelly	
2015	Tumbledown	Shannon	
2017	Todd and the Book of Pure Evil: The End of the End	Jenny Kolinsky (voice)	Animated film
2017	Stronger	Mom at Fenway	
2017	Professor Marston and the Wonder Women	Dorothy Roubicek	
2018	Super Troopers 2	Cassandra Anne Gacek	
2018	American Woman	Brett's Wife	
2023	Sole Suspect	Abby O'Neill	Short film, also Director and co-writer

=== Television ===
Year	Title	Role	Notes
1992	Heritage Minutes	Girl	Season 2, episode 7: "Saguenay Fire"
1994	Tales of the Wild (Original title Aventures dans le Grand Nord)		Episode: "L'honneur des grandes neiges"
1994	Million Dollar Babies	Therese Dionne, 10 yrs.	TV mini series, 2 episodes
1996	Goosebumps	Amy Kramer	Season 1, episode 10: "Night of the Living Dummy II"
1997–2018	Arthur	Molly MacDonald	Animated TV series, 27 episodes
1998	The Mystery Files of Shelby Woo	Josie	Season 4, episode 4: "The Itchy Shorts Mystery"
2000	Are You Afraid of the Dark?	Sandra	Season 7, episode 4: "The Tale of the Stone Maiden"
2000	Big Wolf on Campus	Tori	Season 2, episode 7: "Fear and Loathing in Pleasantville"
2000	Jackie Bouvier Kennedy Onassis	Caroline Kennedy, ages 15 & 16	TV movie
2001	Vampire High	Samantha	Season 1, episode 2: "There's a New Vampire in Town"
2003	Starhunter	Taryn Orford	Season 2, episode 3: "Bio Crime"
2004	The Grid	Cathy	TV mini series, 5 episodes
2005	Beach Girls	Young Stevie	TV mini series, 6 episodes
2006	Flirting with Danger	Jane Heaton	TV movie
2006	Between Truth and Lies	Emily Parker	TV movie
2010	StarStruck	Sara Olson	TV movie
2010–2012	Todd and the Book of Pure Evil	Jenny Kolinsky	
2013	Blast Vegas AKA Destruction: Las Vegas	Olive	TV movie
2015	Saving Hope	Ruth	Season 3, episode 14: "Trading Places"
2015	Broad Squad	Angela	TV movie

== Awards and nominations ==
Castle together with her fellow lead cast members of Todd and the Book of Pure Evil were nominated for Best Ensemble Performance in a Comedy Program or Series for the highly rated musical episode "The Phantom of Crowley High" at the 2011 Gemini Awards, which they went on to win.
