= Some Guy Who Kills People =

- Promotional poster
- Directed by: Jack Perez
- Written by: Ryan Levin
- Produced by: Ryan Levin
- Starring: Kevin Corrigan; Barry Bostwick; Karen Black; Leo Fitzpatrick; Ariel Gade; Lucy Davis
- Cinematography: Shawn Maurer
- Edited by: Chris Conlee
- Music by: Ben Zarai; David Kitchens
- Production companies: Level 10; Battle of Ireland Films; Litn-Up Films
- Distributed by: Lightning Media
- Release dates: October 4, 2012; (Manchester, UK)
- Running time: 93 minutes
- Country: United States
- Language: English

Some Guy Who Kills People is a 2012 American comedy-drama-horror film directed by Jack Perez and written by Ryan Levin. The film was made by a conglomerate of production studios: Level 10, Battle of Ireland Films and Litn-Up Films. John Landis was the executive producer.

== Plot ==
A young Ken Boyd is tormented by five other kids from school until he snaps, becomes suicidal and is institutionalized. Years later, upon Ken's release, he begins to try building a life and reconnecting with the community but those who put him away start turning up dead.

== Cast ==
- Kevin Corrigan as Ken Boyd
- Barry Bostwick as Sheriff Walt Fuller
- Karen Black as Ruth Boyd
- Leo Fitzpatrick as Irv
- Ariel Gade as Amy Wheeler
- Eric Price as Ernie
- Lucy Davis as Stephanie
- Lou Beatty Jr. as Al Fooger
- Janie Haddad as Janet Wheeler
- Ahmed Best as Mayor Maxwell

== Production ==
John Landis was originally slated to direct the film, but he was busy with another project, Burke and Hare. He stayed on as an executive producer, and Jack Perez got an opportunity to pitch his vision for the script through a connection with a co-producer on the film.

When making the film, Perez preferred to be hands on with the visual effects. He used practical effects he'd learned from his past films and would plan sequences with editing in mind. The film was shot on a tight schedule, so there wasn't room for experimentation and plans needed to be settled before scenes were shot.

Due to budget restraints, an elaborate fight scene near the end of the film where the sheriff breaks in had to be cut. A much shorter fight ended up making it into the film.

The film was distributed by Grimm Distribution for theatrical release and DVD sales in October 2012 in the UK.

== Reception ==
On the review aggregator website Rotten Tomatoes, 78% of 9 critics' reviews are positive.

== Awards ==
This film was nominated for two awards, Best Supporting Actor (Barry Bostwick) at the Fangoria Chainsaw Awards (which it did not win) and the Best Picture award at the Nevermore Film Festival (which it did win).
