= Dead Mary =

- DVD cover
- Directed by: Robert Wilson
- Written by: Peter Sheldrick; Christopher Warre Smets
- Produced by: Patrick Cameron; Jonathan Dueck; Harvey Glazer; Kate Harrison; Gary Howsam
- Starring: Dominique Swain; Steven McCarthy; Maggie Castle; Reagan Pasternak; Jefferson Brown; Michael Majeski; Marie-Josée Colburn
- Cinematography: David Mitchell
- Edited by: James P. Villeneuve
- Music by: Alphonse Lanza
- Production company: 235 Films
- Distributed by: Allarco Ent. Genius Products
- Release date: February 20, 2007
- Running time: 103 minutes
- Country: Canada
- Language: English

Dead Mary is a 2007 Canadian supernatural horror film from 235 Films starring Dominique Swain as Kim, about friends who gather at a cabin for a weekend and inadvertently summon an evil witch by reciting her name three times in front of a mirror as part of a game.

== Plot ==
A young woman and a group of her school friends embark on a holiday weekend at a lakeside cabin to reminisce about their college days, only to run afoul of an evil spirit.

== Cast ==
- Dominique Swain as Kim
- Jefferson Brown as Matt
- Steven McCarthy as Bryce Baker
- Maggie Castle as Lily
- Michael Majeski as Dash
- Reagan Pasternak as Amber
- Marie-Josée Colburn as Eve
