= Blast Vegas =

- Film poster
- Teleplay by: Tom Teves; Joe D'Ambrosia
- Story by: Meyer Shwarzstein
- Directed by: Jack Perez
- Starring: Frankie Muniz; Barry Bostwick; Maggie Castle
- Music by: Chris Ridenhour
- Country of origin: United States
- Original language: English

Production
- Executive producer: Meyer Shwarzstein
- Producer: Keith Melton
- Cinematography: Alexander Yellen
- Editor: Chris Conlee
- Running time: 90 minutes
- Production company: Syfy Films

Original release
- Network: Syfy
- Release: July 18, 2013

Blast Vegas is a 2013 American supernatural disaster television film directed by Jack Perez and written by Tom Teves and Joe D'Ambrosia, from a story by Meter Shwarzstein. The film stars Frankie Muniz, Barry Bostwick, and Maggie Castle, and is about an Egyptian sandstorm curse that destroys Las Vegas, Nevada. It first aired on the Syfy channel on July 18, 2013.

== Premise ==
Frat brothers head to Las Vegas for spring break. When one of them steals an ancient Egyptian sword on display in a casino, they unwittingly release a curse that invokes a disastrous sandstorm in Las Vegas. This city is slowly being destroyed while Nelson (Frankie Muniz) and his girlfriend Olive (Maggie Castle), along with Sal (Barry Bostwick) race to remove the curse and calm the storm.

== Cast ==
- Frankie Muniz as Nelson, the protagonist who is trying to remove the curse.
- Barry Bostwick as Sal, a Las Vegas lounge singer who helps Nelson and Olive.
- Maggie Castle as Olive, Nelson's new found girlfriend who's educated in the history of the curse.

== Production ==
The film was written by Tom Teves and Joe D'Ambrosia and directed by Jack Perez. The initial idea of the film originated in summer 2007, when The Asylum announced that the film would be released by February 14, 2012, as Destruction: Las Vegas. In summer 2010, it didn't work due to Grimm's Snow White being produced for that time. By fall 2010, the producers announced a tentative spring 2013 airdate on TNT. Filming began around Spring 2012. Base FX and R-Team provided visual effects and CGI animation for the film. In all 2012, Syfy acquired the rights to air the film by July 18, 2013.
