= List of Goosebumps episodes =

Goosebumps is a children's anthology horror television series based on R. L. Stine's best-selling book series. It originally aired on the Fox Kids Network from 1995 to 1998.

All together, 43 of the original 62 books were adapted, along with nine stories from the Tales to Give You Goosebumps series, and two books from Goosebumps Series 2000. The Chillogy three-parter was a completely original story, while the episode More Monster Blood was an original story based on existing characters. Brad MacDonald composed the score to 41 Goosebumps episodes.

== Series overview ==
Season	Episodes	Originally released	
Season	Episodes	First released	Last released
1	19	October 27, 1995	May 17, 1996
2	25	May 11, 1996	July 20, 1997
3	22	September 6, 1997	May 16, 1998
4	8	September 14, 1998	November 16, 1998

== Episodes ==
=== Season 1 (1995–96) ===
No. overall	No. in season	Title	Directed by	Written by	Adaption of	Original release date	US viewers (millions)
1	1	"The Haunted Mask"	Timothy Bond	José Rivera	The Haunted Mask (Goosebumps #11)	October 27, 1995	14.1
2	2	"The Haunted Mask"	Timothy Bond	José Rivera	The Haunted Mask (Goosebumps #11)	October 27, 1995	14.1
Carly Beth Caldwell steals a Halloween mask from a new store, against the storekeeper's warnings. However the mask begins to change her personality and meld with her body when she wears it. Upon realizing this, Carly Beth tracks down the mask store salesman for a way to break the spell and remove the Haunted Mask.
3	3	"The Cuckoo Clock of Doom"	John Bell	Billy Brown & Dan Angel	The Cuckoo Clock of Doom (Goosebumps #28)	November 3, 1995	N/A
Michael Webster vandalizes his father's new cuckoo clock by twisting the bird's head backwards so his annoying, bratty, trouble-making younger sister Tara will get blamed for it. However, the plan goes wrong when Michael finds himself reliving his disastrous birthday party – and going backwards in time. The only way to stop it is to fix the bird's head. Though Michael succeeds as a toddler and returns to his normal self, he inadvertently knocks off the year 1988 which was part of the clock and removes/erases Tara from existence. Michael decides to replace the year back on the clock to restore Tara, but not for a while. Starring: John White as Michael Webster
4	4	"The Girl Who Cried Monster"	John Bell	Charles Lazer	The Girl Who Cried Monster (Goosebumps #8)	November 10, 1995	N/A
Lucy Dark discovers the monstrous dark side of the town librarian during closing time, but no one else believes her. And what's scarier is that this librarian's been invited to dinner!
5	5	"Welcome to Camp Nightmare"	Ron Oliver	Jeffrey Cohen	Welcome to Camp Nightmare (Goosebumps #9)	November 17, 1995	N/A
6	6	"Welcome to Camp Nightmare"	Ron Oliver	Jeffrey Cohen	Welcome to Camp Nightmare (Goosebumps #9)	November 24, 1995	N/A
Part 1: Billy's summer camp turns scary when Camp Nightmoon becomes Camp Nightmare! Why are all the counselors acting so weird? What is hidden in the forbidden bunk? What lurks around the camp late at night? The counselors are not answering any of Billy's questions. The campers are disappearing one by one, and the counselors do not even care. Billy wants to know the secrets about Camp Nightmoon, but can he find the answers before he disappears? Part 2: Billy finds out the secret about Camp Nightmoon when the counselors announce a manhunt for a female camper who escaped from the girls' side of the camp where the same scary things are happening. Starring: Kaj-Erik Eriksen as Billy Harlan
7	7	"Phantom of the Auditorium"	John Bell	Bruce Edwards	Phantom of the Auditorium (Goosebumps #24)	December 1, 1995	NA
When Zeke gets to play as the Phantom in the school's titular play The Phantom, strange things start happening. A piece of scenery comes crashing down with a message saying "Last warning. Stay away Esmerelda or else!". Could Zeke be trying to ruin the play? Or could there really be a phantom living under the stage? Starring: Stuart Stone as Brian Colson, and Kathy Greenwood as Ms. Walker.
8	8	"Piano Lessons Can Be Murder"	William Fruet	Charles Lazer	Piano Lessons Can Be Murder (Goosebumps #13)	December 8, 1995	N/A
Jerry Hawkins moves to a new house and discovers a piano in the basement. He starts taking piano lessons to impress a neighbor, but he realizes something is very odd about his teacher, Dr. Shreek. He is always talking about how Jerry has perfect hands. And the janitor Mr. Toggle is weird too. But Jerry is about to find out that Dr. Shreek loves to steal the hands of his students... Starring: Erica Luttrell as Kim
9	9	"Return of the Mummy"	John Bell	Charles Lazer	Return of the Mummy (Goosebumps #23)	December 22, 1995	N/A
Gabe and his cousin, Sari, are trapped in a pyramid belonging to an Egyptian princess disguised as a modern-day journalist who is controlling a four-thousand-year-old mummy. Starring: Daniel DeSanto as Gabe, Annick Obonsawin as Sari
10	10	"Night of the Living Dummy II (Goosebumps episode)"	Ron Oliver	Rick Drew	Night of the Living Dummy II (Goosebumps #31)	January 12, 1996	N/A
Amy Kramer receives a replacement ventriloquist dummy named Slappy, who she accidentally brings to life. Slappy wants Amy to be his slave to the point of framing her for things she did not do. It is up to Amy to stop Slappy and save her family. In the end, Slappy is destroyed by another dummy.: Starring: Maggie Castle as Amy Kramer, Caterina Scorsone as Sara Kramer, Shadia Simmons as Alicia.
11	11	"My Hairiest Adventure"	David Warry-Smith	Michael Short	My Hairiest Adventure (Goosebumps #26)	January 19, 1996	N/A
Larry Boyd and his friends try on an old bottle of Instant Tan, but they vanish - and Larry gets hairy! Larry freaks out as he finds out that there are more dogs in the neighborhood than usual.
12	12	"Stay Out of the Basement"	William Fruet	Sean Kelly	Stay Out of the Basement (Goosebumps #2)	January 26, 1996	N/A
13	13	"Stay Out of the Basement"	William Fruet	Sean Kelly	Stay Out of the Basement (Goosebumps #2)	January 26, 1996	N/A
Part 1: Margaret and Casey Brewer are worried about their father. He's been acting strange. And he spends all his time in the basement. What is he doing in the basement? Margaret and Casey are about to find out. Dr. Brewer is doing experiments with plants. But Margaret and Casey become even more worried when they "meet" some of his experiments in the basement. Part 2: Margaret and Casey discover that the man they thought was their father is really a plant copy of him who trapped their real father in a closet in the basement, which was caused after his blood was mixed with his experiments by accident. Soon both men attempt to convince the siblings that they are their real father until Dr. Brewer calls Margaret a nickname he used when they were younger, as Casey and Margaret then spray the copy with herbicide, killing it. Margaret later finds flowers in the garden talking to her, claiming to be her real father.: Starring: Judah Katz as Dr. Brewer
14	14	"It Came from Beneath the Sink"	David Winning	Rick Drew	It Came from Beneath the Sink! (Goosebumps #30)	February 2, 1996	N/A
Kat finds a sponge under the sink of her new house that's actually a monster that causes and feeds on bad luck. When Kat, Daniel, and Daniel's friend Carlos give away the sponge, they find out from Carlos that the sponge is called a Grool and that anyone who has it and gets rid of it, will die...: Starring: Katharine Isabelle as Kat Merton, Tyrone Savage as Daniel Merton, Amanda Tapping as Mrs. Merton
15	15	"Say Cheese and Die"	Ron Oliver	Bruce Edwards	Say Cheese and Die! (Goosebumps #4)	February 9, 1996	N/A
Friends Greg Banks, Doug "Bird", Michael and Sherri Walker, find a camera that predicts and causes misfortune on the subject it photographs.: Starring: Ryan Gosling as Greg Banks, Dan Petronijevic as Joey Ferris and Scott Speedman as Officer Madison.
16	16	"A Night in Terror Tower"	William Fruet	Dan Angel & Billy Brown	A Night in Terror Tower (Goosebumps #27)	February 25, 1996	8.8
17	17	"A Night in Terror Tower"	William Fruet	Dan Angel & Billy Brown	A Night in Terror Tower (Goosebumps #27)	February 25, 1996	8.8
Sue and Eddie take a trip to England to visit a castle. When they wander away from their group in the torture chamber, they get chased throughout the castle by an executioner. When they manage to escape, they soon begin to lose their memories of their family and themselves. Sue and Eddie are then sent back in time to the Middle Ages where a man named Morgred reveals that the siblings are really a missing prince and princess whom the executioner, under the king's orders, wanted dead. Starring: Corey Sevier as Eddie
18	18	"The Werewolf of Fever Swamp"	William Fruet	Neal Shusterman	The Werewolf of Fever Swamp (Goosebumps #14)	May 17, 1996	9.0
19	19	"The Werewolf of Fever Swamp"	William Fruet	Neal Shusterman	The Werewolf of Fever Swamp (Goosebumps #14)	May 17, 1996	9.0
Grady Tucker adopts a dog suspected of terrorizing the livestock by his family. Grady tries to prove that Vandal (the dog) is not responsible, but is shocked to find out that a real werewolf may be on the loose. Starring: Brendan Fletcher as Grady Tucker, Don Francks as the Swamp Hermit

=== Season 2 (1996–97) ===
No. overall	No. in season	Title	Directed by	Written by	Adaption of	Original release date	US viewers (millions)
20	1	"Be Careful What You Wish For"	René Bonnière	Charles Lazer	Be Careful What You Wish For... (Goosebumps #12)	May 11, 1996	N/A
Clumsy 12-year-old Samantha "Fly Away" Byrd (as dubbed by the bully, Judith) helps a strange woman named Clarissa find her way home. The woman gives Samantha an amulet that grants wishes – but Samantha learns that any wish granted, when not careful with the wording, comes with a price. In the end, she decides to wish everything back to normal. Samantha decides her friends and family are important and discards the amulet, which is found by Judith. When she makes a vain wish to be beautiful and looked at forever, it literally turns Judith into a park statue.
21	2	"Attack of the Mutant"	William Fruet	Billy Brown & Dan Angel	Attack of the Mutant (Goosebumps #25)	September 7, 1996	N/A
22	3	"Attack of the Mutant"	William Fruet	Billy Brown & Dan Angel	Attack of the Mutant (Goosebumps #25)	September 7, 1996	N/A
Part 1: Skipper Matthews finds out his favorite comic book villain, the Masked Mutant, is real after discovering his lair. Part 2: Skipper Matthews fears he is losing his grip on reality after a visit through the Masked Mutant's lair and discovers that his new best friend is not who she seems.: Guest Star: Adam West as The Galloping Gazelle.
23	4	"Bad Hare Day"	John Bell	Charles Lazer	Bad Hare Day (Goosebumps #41)	September 14, 1996	N/A
Tim Swanson steals the bag of tricks from his favorite magician Amaz-O and finds himself unable to control the magic. Starring: Dov Tiefenbach as Tim Swanson, Harvey Atkin as Mr. Malik. Cameo by Colin Mochrie.
24	5	"The Headless Ghost"	Brian R.R. Hebb C.S.C.	Dan Angel & Billy Brown	The Headless Ghost (Goosebumps #37)	September 21, 1996	N/A
Pranksters Duane Comack and Stephanie Alpert find themselves trapped in a seaside house haunted by a headless ghost, along with a ghost of a boy who died falling through a dumbwaiter and the ghost of a sea captain who takes the form of a friendly, but firm tour guide named Otto, the latter of whom has malignant plans in mind for Stephanie.
25	6	"Go Eat Worms"	Steve DiMarco	Rick Drew	Go Eat Worms! (Goosebumps #21)	September 28, 1996	N/A
Todd Barstow uses his test worms to pull pranks on his little sister, Regina. Then, his test worms show up in his lunch container and in his bed. Thinking that it was Regina, he goes to the woods on a rainy night to search for more worms in order to pull a prank on Regina, but uncovers a cave that is inhabited by a giant worm hell - bent on killing Todd for mistreating her offspring. Starring: Noah Shebib as Todd Barstow, Kristin Fairlie as Regina
26	7	"You Can't Scare Me"	René Bonnière	Peter Mitchell	You Can't Scare Me! (Goosebumps #15)	October 5, 1996	N/A
Two pranksters' quest to scare fearless Courtney ends with them running scared when they encounter a mud monster at a local swamp. Starring: Charlotte Sullivan as Courtney, and Dylan Provencher as Eddie.
27	8	"Revenge of the Lawn Gnomes"	William Fruet	Charles Lazer	Revenge of the Lawn Gnomes (Goosebumps #34)	October 12, 1996	N/A
Joe Burton's dad buys a pair of garden gnomes for a lawn contest, but Joe and his sister Mindy discover that the lawn gnomes are alive and cause destruction to their militant neighbor's garden at night with Joe being framed for it. The siblings learn that the gnomes can only move in the dark, so they try to prevent the gnomes from attacking another garden but are caught by their neighbor who chases them away and attempts to throw the gnomes away only to be attacked and turned into one himself. Starring: David Hemblen as Major McCall
28	9	"Ghost Beach"	Steve DiMarco	Jeffrey Cohen	Ghost Beach (Goosebumps #22)	October 19, 1996	N/A
Two siblings, Jerry and Terri Sadler visit relatives who live in a house beside a beach where they hear rumors of a ghost haunting a nearby cave.
29	10	"Attack of the Jack O Lanterns"	William Fruet	Dan Angel & Billy Brown	Attack of the Jack O Lanterns (Goosebumps #48)	October 26, 1996	N/A
When Drew Brockman, Walker, Shane, and Shana trick-or-treat with their rivals, Tabby and Lee, they come upon two pumpkin-headed creatures who force them to trick-or-treat forever. Starring: Erica Luttrell as Drew
30	11	"Haunted Mask II"	William Fruet	Dan Angel & Billy Brown	The Haunted Mask II (Goosebumps #36)	October 29, 1996	9.2
31	12	"Haunted Mask II"	William Fruet	Dan Angel & Billy Brown	The Haunted Mask II (Goosebumps #36)	October 29, 1996	9.2
Steve Boswell takes an old man-like mask from the same store that Carly Beth went to and begins to become an old man. Meanwhile, the original Haunted Mask returns and, through Steve, plans to exact its revenge on Carly Beth.
32	13	"Let's Get Invisible"	Ron Oliver	Rick Drew	Let's Get Invisible! (Goosebumps #6)	November 2, 1996	N/A
Max and Noah Thompson find a mirror in the attic that turns its users invisible, but on the other side is a world where the evil mirror reflections want to switch places with real people. Starring: Kevin Zegers as Noah Thompson
33	14	"Scarecrow Walks at Midnight"	Randy Bradshaw	Scott Peters	The Scarecrow Walks at Midnight (Goosebumps #20)	November 9, 1996	N/A
Jodie and her brother Mark are sent to spend a month with their grandparents and their shifty farmhand on the farm, only to realize the scarecrows there have been brought to life and haunt the farm at night.
34	15	"Monster Blood"	Timothy Bond	Rick Drew	Monster Blood (Goosebumps #3)	November 16, 1996	N/A
Evan Ross and his friend Andy discover a novelty slime called Monster Blood that devours everything in its path, and makes whatever eats it grow-- uncontrollably!
35	16	"More Monster Blood"	Timothy Bond	Dan Angel, Billy Brown & Rick Drew	Original, based upon characters from Monster Blood & Monster Blood II.	November 16, 1996	N/A
Evan travels back home, only to find that the Monster Blood he thought was destroyed is aboard the plane.
36	17	"Vampire Breath"	Ron Oliver	Rick Drew	Vampire Breath (Goosebumps #49)	November 23, 1996	N/A
Freddy and Cara find a bottle that releases an elderly vampire who lost his fangs. Starring: Meredith Henderson as Cara Renfield
37	18	"How to Kill a Monster"	Ron Oliver	Ron Oliver	How to Kill a Monster (Goosebumps #46)	February 1, 1997	N/A
Gretchen Hughes and Clark Boretski stay at their grandparents' house in the middle of a swamp that has a seemingly invincible monster locked in a room. Starring: Ricky Mabe as Clark
38	19	"Calling All Creeps"	Craig Pryce	Dan Angel & Billy Brown	Calling All Creeps! (Goosebumps #50)	February 15, 1997	N/A
Ricky Beamer plays a prank on his rival Tasha McClain that calls the attention of school bullies named Wart, David and Brenda, all of which are actually reptilian aliens bent on world domination by converting humanity.
39	20	"Welcome to Dead House"	William Fruet	Dan Angel & Billy Brown	Welcome to Dead House (Goosebumps #1)	June 29, 1997	5.6
40	21	"Welcome to Dead House"	William Fruet	Dan Angel & Billy Brown	Welcome to Dead House (Goosebumps #1)	June 29, 1997	5.6
The Benson family moves into a house in a neighborhood where its residents were killed in an accident from a chemical factory and want the family's blood to survive.
41	22	"Don't Wake Mummy"	William Fruet	Rick Drew	"Don't Wake Mummy" (Even More Tales to Give You Goosebumps)	July 12, 1997	N/A
A family inherits a sarcophagus that holds a cursed, living mummy.: Starring: A.J. Cook as Kim
42	23	"The Blob That Ate Everyone"	Randy Bradshaw	Charles Lazer	The Blob That Ate Everyone (Goosebumps #55)	July 19, 1997	N/A
Zack Beauchamp and his best friend Alex wander into an abandoned antique shop and find a typewriter that Zack uses to type up a story about an oozing blob monster that terrorizes the video store at the mall. When Zack goes to the video store the next day, the blob appears in real life and frightens the customers and soon devours everything in its path. The owner returns and tells Zach that the typewriter makes whatever is written on it real and that he must write an ending to his story in order for the blob to disappear.
43	24	"Night of the Living Dummy III"	Timothy Bond	Neal Shusterman	Night of the Living Dummy III (Goosebumps #40)	July 20, 1997	5.8
44	25	"Night of the Living Dummy III"	Timothy Bond	Neal Shusterman	Night of the Living Dummy III (Goosebumps #40)	July 20, 1997	5.8
After being taken to the O'Dells family, who owns a collection of ventriloquist dummies, Slappy is brought back to life and plans to test out Zane, a cousin of Trina and Daniel. With the help of another dummy named Rocky, Slappy conspires to turn the three children into dummies. In the end, Slappy is destroyed by a lightning bolt.: Starring: Hayden Christensen as Zane.

=== Season 3 (1997–98) ===
No. overall	No. in season	Title	Directed by	Written by	Adaption of	Original release date
45	1	"Shocker on Shock Street"	Randy Bradshaw	Dan Angel & Billy Brown	A Shocker on Shock Street (Goosebumps #35)	September 6, 1997
Erin Wright and her friend Marty are trapped in an amusement park based on a horror movie series. Starring: Brooke Nevin as Erin Wright, Eric Peterson as Mr. Wright
46	2	"My Best Friend Is Invisible"	William Fruet	Scott Peters	My Best Friend Is Invisible (Goosebumps #57)	September 8, 1997
Sammy Jacobs visits a house that's supposedly haunted by the ghost of a lonely boy named Brent, who ends up following him home and becomes his "invisible" friend.
47	3	"The House of No Return"	William Fruet	Billy Brown & Dan Angel	"The House of No Return" (Tales to Give You Goosebumps)	September 13, 1997
Mischievous friends Lori, Nathan, and Robbie convince the new kid in town, Chris Wakely, to join their club, Danger, Inc. The catch is that Chris must spend one hour in an old house, allegedly haunted by the ghosts of a married couple, who died in the house. However, soon the catch is on Lori and her friends, when they head inside to collect Chris. To their horror, he had made the deal with the ghost of the married couple in exchange for his freedom, Lori and her friends would have to spend eternity with the couple as a replacement for their own lost child.
48	4	"Don't Go to Sleep"	John Bell	Rick Drew	Don't Go to Sleep! (Goosebumps #54)	September 20, 1997
After being told that he can't have the attic as his room, Matt Amsterdam goes to sleep in there and finds himself in a chain of alternate worlds and on the run from a police force bent on nabbing anyone who messes with reality.
49	5	"Click"	John Bell	Scott Peters	"Click" (Tales to Give You Goosebumps)	September 27, 1997
Seth Gold mail-orders a remote control that controls his TV, his VCR, his stereo and as he discovers, reality itself, at the gradual cost of the remote taking over his mind.
50	6	"An Old Story"	Randy Bradshaw	Charles Lazer	"An Old Story" (Still More Tales to Give You Goosebumps)	October 4, 1997
While being babysat by their Aunt Dahlia, Tom and John are forced to eat prune cookies, which turn them into old men as part of a plot to get sold out to two of Aunt Dahlia's widow friends who want husbands. Starring: Kyle Downes as Tom
51	7	"The Barking Ghost"	William Fruet	Charles Lazer	The Barking Ghost (Goosebumps #32)	October 11, 1997
Cooper Holmes and his new friend Fergie Ferguson are tricked into switching bodies with ghostly canines (formerly, a pair of thieves named Grimm and Scratch that were attacked by search dogs 3 centuries ago). The dogs then start to take the kids' lives while Cooper and Fergie are kicked out of Cooper's home by his own parents. Cooper and Fergie then manage to trick the dogs into the spot where they swapped and manage to return to their normal lives, not knowing that Cooper's brother Mickey had followed them and switched bodies with a chipmunk.
52	8	"One Day at Horrorland"	William Fruet	Dan Angel & Billy Brown	One Day at HorrorLand (Goosebumps #16)	October 25, 1997
53	9	"One Day at Horrorland"	William Fruet	Dan Angel & Billy Brown	One Day at HorrorLand (Goosebumps #16)	November 1, 1997
Part 1: The Morris family get trapped in a theme park called "Horrorland" run by monsters called Horrors. Part 2: The Morris family compete on a game show run by the Horrors of Horrorland.: Note: Unlike the original book in which the Morris family escapes—only to find a Horror hanging on to their rear bumper which offers them free tickets to return to Horrorland—there was a twist ending in which they do escape, only to find that their car has been controlled by the Horrors to teeter on the edge of a literal cliffhanger; the ending then cuts to a Horror couple watching the event on their TV set... and then switching it off!
54	10	"The Haunted House Game"	William Fruet	Scott Peters	"The Haunted House Game" (Even More Tales to Give You Goosebumps)	November 8, 1997
Two friends play a haunted house-themed board game that comes to life and may cost them theirs. Starring: Laura Vandervoort as Nadine Platt
55	11	"Perfect School"	Ron Oliver	Scott Peters	"Perfect School" (Even More Tales to Give You Goosebumps)	November 15, 1997
56	12	"Perfect School"	Ron Oliver	Scott Peters	"Perfect School" (Even More Tales to Give You Goosebumps)	November 15, 1997
Part 1: Having caused trouble once too often, Brian O'Connor gets sent to an all-boys boarding school that he tries to escape. Part 2: Brian discovers the secret of the Perfect School; the students are cloned and programmed into being well-behaved so they can be sent home to their parents while the real students are locked away in a basement prison. And also that his best friend is an agent for the faculty and tries to escape before his clone supplants him, Brian stages a breakout only to be caught by his clone. "Brian" is returned to his family but they see that he is too perfect for them until he pulls a prank on them, it is revealed that Brian managed to pose as his clone who was mistaken for Brian and locked in the basement. Brian then hacks into the boarding school's security and opens the doors freeing the students and exposing the school's secret. Starring: Shawn Roberts as Brian O'Connor
57	13	"Werewolf Skin"	Ron Oliver	Dan Angel & Billy Brown	Werewolf Skin (Goosebumps #60)	November 22, 1997
58	14	"Werewolf Skin"	Ron Oliver	Dan Angel & Billy Brown	Werewolf Skin (Goosebumps #60)	November 22, 1997
Part 1: Visiting his aunt and uncle in rural Wolf Creek, budding photographer Alex Blackwell discovers a secret about the werewolves that live in the woods. Part 2: Alex confronts his aunt and uncle about the werewolf skin they use to turn themselves into actual werewolves. Starring: Keegan MacIntosh as Alex Blackwell
59	15	"Awesome Ants"	Don McCutcheon	Neal Shusterman	"Awesome Ants" (Still More Tales to Give You Goosebumps)	February 7, 1998
Dave buys an ant farm but feeds the ants incorrectly, turning them into bloodthirsty giants. Starring: Michael Yarmush as Dave Warren, Mpho Koaho as Ben, Catherine Disher as Mrs. Warren
60	16	"Bride of the Living Dummy"	Randy Bradshaw	Ron Oliver	Bride of the Living Dummy (Goosebumps Series 2000 #2)	February 14, 1998
Slappy is brought back to life and now plans to marry a little girl's doll who proves to be just as evil as Slappy. In the end, Slappy and Mary-Ellen were destroyed by a razor blade and their souls emerge from the dummies. As a result, Slappy possessed Harrison. Starring: Wayne Robson as Jimmie O'James
61	17	"Strained Peas"	Don McCutcheon	Rick Drew	"Strained Peas" (Tales to Give You Goosebumps)	February 21, 1998
Nicholas Morgan discovers that his new baby sister Grace is actually a monster who will do whatever it takes to be an only child.
62	18	"Say Cheese and Die… Again"	Ron Oliver	Dan Angel & Billy Brown	Say Cheese and Die—Again! (Goosebumps #44)	February 28, 1998
Greg Banks tries to prove to his English teacher that the evil camera he found really exists so he doesn't have to flunk his class. When Greg unearths it, he accidentally takes a picture of Sherri which comes out as a negative, foretelling that she'll be so thin, she'll waste away. In order to get back at him for taking her picture, she takes a picture of him that predicts that he'll become so fat, he'll explode.
63	19	"Chillogy"	William Fruet	Billy Brown & Dan Angel	Original	April 25, 1998
64	20	"Chillogy"	William Fruet	Billy Brown & Dan Angel	Original	May 2, 1998
65	21	"Chillogy"	William Fruet	Billy Brown & Dan Angel	Original	May 9, 1998
Part 1 - Squeal of Fortune: Jessica, a greedy girl, gets sucked into a toy town called Karlsville where she cheats the people during a lemonade sale and as punishment she turns into a piglike humanoid as the town chases her down. Part 2 - Strike Three... You're Doomed: Matthew gets sucked into Karlsville and gets caught in a twisted baseball game that may cost him his life. Part 3 - Escape from Karlsville: Matthew and Jessica re-enter the toy town to prevent Matthew's younger brother Todd from being turned into a plastic figurine as part of a contest prize.
66	22	"Teacher's Pet"	Stefan Scaini	Andrea Raffaghello	"Teacher's Pet" (Tales to Give You Goosebumps)	May 16, 1998
On a field trip in the woods, Becca Thompson and Benji Connor find out why their new science teacher loves snakes so much.: Note: This episode was dedicated to Becca's actress, Michelle Risi, who died of meningitis following its production. She was 16 years old.

=== Season 4 (1998) ===
No. overall	No. in season	Title	Directed by	Written by	Adaption of	Original release date
67	1	"How I Got My Shrunken Head"	Ron Oliver	Ron Oliver	How I Got My Shrunken Head (Goosebumps #39)	September 14, 1998
68	2	"How I Got My Shrunken Head"	Ron Oliver	Ron Oliver	How I Got My Shrunken Head (Goosebumps #39)	September 14, 1998
Part 1: Mark Rowe is given a shrunken head from his explorer aunt, only to discover that it has dark powers. Mark then must travel to the Pacific jungle island of Baladora in order to find her. Part 2: Mark learns of the jungle magic hidden in his shrunken head while searching for his aunt, and learns that her assistants want the shrunken head too. Starring: Daniel Clark as Mark Rowe
69	3	"The Ghost Next Door"	Don McCutcheon	Neal Shusterman	The Ghost Next Door (Goosebumps #10)	September 28, 1998
70	4	"The Ghost Next Door"	Don McCutcheon	Neal Shusterman	The Ghost Next Door (Goosebumps #10)	September 28, 1998
Part 1: Hannah Fairchild mistakes a boy named Danny Anderson for a ghost of a kid that died in a house fire until she learns from a dark figure, who resembles a shadow, that she's the ghost. Part 2: After learning of her past and the dark figure's plan to kill Danny, Hannah must save him from a fiery fate so her soul can rest in peace and Danny can be safe.
71	5	"Cry of the Cat"	Ron Oliver	Ron Oliver	Cry of the Cat (Goosebumps Series 2000 #1)	October 31, 1998
72	6	"Cry of the Cat"	Ron Oliver	Ron Oliver	Cry of the Cat (Goosebumps Series 2000 #1)	October 31, 1998
Part 1: Allison Rogers, a teen actress starring in the upcoming movie Cry of the Cat, gets scratched by a strange cat named Rip who she accidentally ran over with her bike and starts acting like a cat. Part 2: After an accident on the set of Cry of the Cat, Allison is put in a hospital where she learns why the cat who turned her into a monster, Rip, won't stay dead and how it affected her friend's mother.
73	7	"Deep Trouble"	William Fruet	Jessica Scott & Mike Wollaeger	Deep Trouble II (Goosebumps #58)	November 16, 1998
74	8	"Deep Trouble"	William Fruet	Jessica Scott & Mike Wollaeger	Deep Trouble II (Goosebumps #58)	November 16, 1998
Part 1: Billy and Sheena Deep are visiting their uncle Dr. Deep in the Caribbean, where they stumble upon a plan to turn normal fish into mutants. Part 2: Billy, Sheena, and Dr. Deep try to escape from an island that Jacob Ritter, Dr. Deep's assistant, marooned them on but encounter some of Ritter's test subjects along the way. The mutants capture Dr. Deep believing that he is responsible for their condition until the children claim that Ritter is the one responsible as he plans to use Deep's formula. As Ritter prepares to flee with the rest of the formula, he is confronted by the mutants. Soon, the mutants are cured while Ritter (having been turned into a gill fin man) is put on display at an aquarium. Starring: Laura Vandervoort as Sheena Deep, Tod Fennell as Billy Deep

== See also ==
- List of Goosebumps books
