= A Samba for Sherlock =

2001 film by Miguel Faria, Jr

- Theatrical release poster
- Directed by: Miguel Faria Jr.
- Written by: Marcos Bernstein
- Based on: O Xangô de Baker Street by Jô Soares
- Produced by: Caíque Martins Ferreira; Marcelo Laffitte
- Starring: Joaquim de Almeida; Anthony O'Donnell; Maria de Medeiros; Marco Nanini
- Cinematography: Lauro Escorel
- Edited by: Diana Vasconcellos
- Music by: Edu Lobo
- Production company: Sky Light Cinema
- Distributed by: Columbia Pictures
- Release dates: September 27, 2001 (Festival do Rio); October 19, 2001 (Brazil and Portugal)
- Running time: 124 minutes
- Countries: Brazil; Portugal
- Languages: Portuguese; English; French; Italian; Spanish
- Budget: R$4–10 million
- Box office: R$2,275,052

O Xangô de Baker Street (English title: A Samba for Sherlock) is 2001 Brazilian-Portuguese film directed by Miguel Faria Jr., based on the novel of the same name by Jô Soares. The film was first announced in 1996, but filming only started in September 1998 in Porto, Portugal, lasting until 1999.

== Plot ==
Rio de Janeiro, 1886. Actress Sarah Bernhardt performs at the city's Municipal Theater, captivating the local audience enthralled by French culture. The city is at her feet, and even the Emperor Pedro II comes to pay his respects. He confides a secret to her: the disappearance of a precious Stradivarius violin presented by him to the charming widow Baroness Maria Luiza. The actress suggests to the monarch to hire her friend, the legendary British detective Sherlock Holmes, to solve the case. Subsequently, a brutal murder shocks the city, and leaves the police superintendent Mello Pimenta: a prostitute had been killed and mutilated, her ears cut off and a violin string strategically placed on her body by the perpetrator. Later, under the heat of the tropical sun, the lives of Holmes and Doctor Watson are changed forever, as they find themselves neck-deep in a cultural milieu that portrays all standard Brazilian stereotypes.

== Cast ==
- Joaquim de Almeida ... Sherlock Holmes
- Marco Nanini ... Mello Pimenta
- Anthony O'Donnell ... Doctor Watson
- Maria de Medeiros ... Sarah Bernhardt
- Cláudia Abreu ... Baroness Maria Luiza
- Caco Ciocler ... Miguel Solera de Lara
- Marcello Antony ... Marquês de Salles
- Cláudio Marzo ... Emperor Pedro II
- Martha Overbeck ... Empress Theresa Christina
- Thalma de Freitas ... Ana Candelária
- Letícia Sabatella ... Esperidiana
- Malu Galli ... Chiquinha Gonzaga
- Jô Soares ... Desembargador Coelho Bastos
- Walney Costa ... José White
- Roger Belo ... Comte d'Eu
- Regiana Antonini ... Princess Isabel
- Christine Fernandes ... Albertina
