= Isabel Pisano =

Uruguayan actress, writer and journalist (1944–2025)

- Born: 9 July 1944; Montevideo, Uruguay
- Died: 25 August 2025 (aged 81); Madrid, Spain
- Occupations: Actress; journalist; writer
- Website: isabelpisano.es

Isabel Pisano (9 July 1944 – 25 August 2025) was a Uruguayan actress, writer and journalist that lived in several countries.

== Life and career ==
Pisano worked with several film directors from Argentina, Spain (Bilbao by Bigas Luna) and Italy (Casanova by Federico Fellini).

A war journalist for RAI (Italy) and El Mundo, she covered Palestine, Lebanon, Chad, Iraq, Bosnia and Somalia. She was the only journalist present at the Mosul and Basra bombings in 1993. She was granted a medal by the Spanish Culture Ministry.

The film Whore (2004) is based upon her 2003 book Yo, puta.

She wrote Bigas Luna's biography Sombras de Bigas, luces de Luna.

Isabel Pisano was married to Argentinian composer Waldo de los Ríos, who died in 1977. Afterward, she was in a relationship with Yasser Arafat for 12 months.

Pisano died from Alzheimer's disease at a care home in Madrid, on 25 August 2025, at the age of 81.

== Selected filmography ==
- Savage Pampas (1966) as Lucy
- La prima notte di nozze (1976) as Gemma
- Bilbao (1978) as Bilbao
- Una sombra en la oscuridad (1979)
- Corridas de alegría (1982) as Volcaíta

== Work ==
- Yasir Arafat: La pasion de un lider, Ediciones B., 2006 (ISBN 8466625100).
- Yo Terrorista, Plaza & Janés Editories, 2004 (ISBN 8401378826).
- La Sospecha: El Complot Que Amenaza La Sociedad Actual, Belacqva, 2003 (ISBN 849589453X).
- El Amado Fantasma, Plaza & Janés Editories, 2002 (ISBN 8401377900)
