= Jô Soares =

Brazilian comedian (1938–2022)

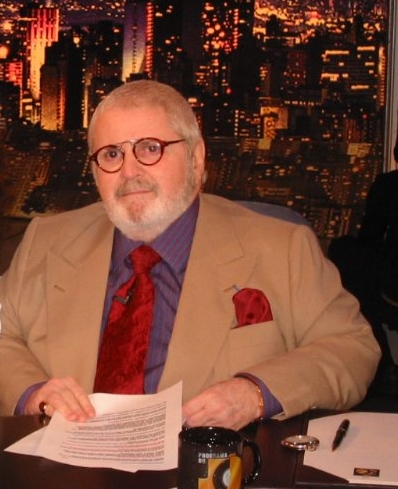
- Soares in 2009
- Born: José Eugênio Soares; 16 January 1938; Rio de Janeiro, Brazil
- Died: 5 August 2022 (aged 84); São Paulo, Brazil
- Notable work: Viva o Gordo (1981–1987); Jô Soares Onze e Meia (1988–1999); Programa do Jô (2000–2016)
- Spouses: Therezinha Millet Austregésilo (m. 1959; div. 1979) Sílvia Bandeira (m. 1980; div. 1983) Flávia Junqueira Pedras (m. 1987; div. 1998)
- Children: 1
- Relatives: Kanela (uncle)

Comedy career
- Years active: 1954–2018
- Genres: Observational comedy; surreal humor; deadpan

José Eugênio Soares (16 January 1938 – 5 August 2022), known professionally as Jô Soares (Portuguese: /ˈʒo soˈaɾis, ˈswa-, -ɾiʃ/), or Jô, was a Brazilian comedian, talk show host, author, musician, actor and writer.

== Early life ==
Soares was born in Rio de Janeiro. Initially pursuing diplomatic service, influenced by his great-grandfather, Soares returned to Brazil for acting classes, and started his career in Rio de Janeiro in 1958.

== Career ==
Soares' television career began at TV Rio in 1958, writing and performing in comedy shows for the station. In 1970, he began to work at Rede Globo. Soares moved to SBT, in 1988, as the host of, "Jô Soares Onze e Meia", (Jô Soares [at] Eleven-Thirty [in the evening]), which aired until 1999. In 2000, he took his show's format (very similar to David Letterman's) back to Rede Globo, where it was then named, "Programa do Jô", which ran until 2016.

His first novel, O Xangô de Baker Street (translated as A Samba for Sherlock), was published in 1995 and has been translated into several languages. It was later adapted to a movie with the same name in 2001. Soares also put out various jazz CDs, as well as producing many plays, including a recent version of Richard III.

== Personal life ==
Jô Soares was a Roman Catholic. He expressed devotion to Rita of Cascia.

Soares is depicted in the 2024 Globoplay documentary film Um Beijo do Gordo.

== Filmography ==
Below is an incomplete filmography:

Year	Title	Role	Notes
1970–1972	Faça Humor, Não Faça Guerra	Various	sketch comedy series
1972–1975	Satiricom	Various	sketch comedy series
1976–1982	Planeta dos Homens	Dr. Sardinha / Dr. Rafael / Brother Carmelo	sketch comedy series
1981–1987	Viva o Gordo	Captain Gay / Other recurring roles	sketch comedy series
1988–1999	Jô Soares Onze e Meia	Host	2,309 episodes
1988–1990	Veja o Gordo	Various	sketch comedy series
2000–2016	Programa do Jô	Host	8,000+ episodes

== Bibliography ==
- A Samba for Sherlock (book) (Portuguese: O Xangô de Baker Street) (1995)
- Twelve Fingers (Portuguese: O Homem Que Matou Getúlio Vargas) (1998)
- Assassinatos na Academia Brasileira de Letras (2005)
- As Esganadas (2011)
