= Miguel Faria Jr. =

Brazilian film director and screenwriter

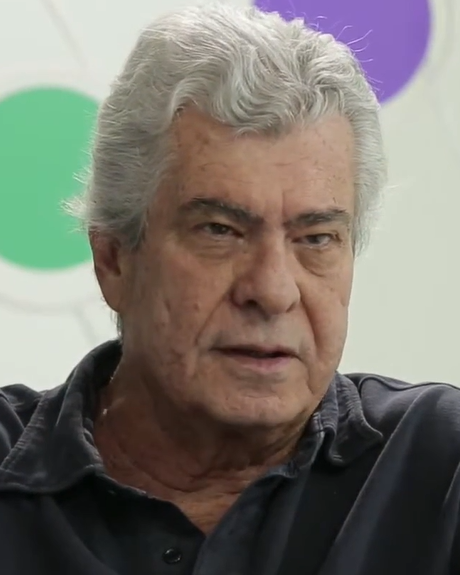
- Born: 28 September 1944 (age 81); Rio de Janeiro, Brazil
- Occupations: Film director, screenwriter
- Years active: 1969-2005

Miguel Faria Jr. (born 28 September 1944) is a Brazilian film director and screenwriter. He directed 13 films, between 1969 and 2016.

== Selected filmography ==
- Mortal Sin (1970)
- A Samba for Sherlock (2001)
