= List of productions filmed at Pinewood Group facilities =

Pinewood Group is a multimedia studio company comprising several major film and television studios including the primary Pinewood Studios, Shepperton Studios and Pinewood Toronto Studios, with additional facilities located in the Dominican Republic. Former facilities include in Atlanta (now known as Trilith Studios), and in Malaysia (now known as Iskandar Malaysia Studios). Users can now search an interactive filmography on the Pinewood Studios Group website.

This is a list of Pinewood productions, by year and studio location.

== Pinewood Studios, Iver Heath ==
=== 1930s–1990s ===
- Talk of the Devil (1939)
- Black Narcissus (1947)
- Oliver Twist (1948)
- The Red Shoes (1948)
- The Blue Lagoon (1949)
- The Importance of Being Earnest (1952)
- Genevieve (1953)
- Doctor in the House (1954)
- A Town Like Alice (1956)
- The Spanish Gardener (1956)
- Ill Met by Moonlight (1957)
- Miracle in Soho (1957)
- The Prince and the Showgirl (1957)
- Carry On Sergeant (1958)
- A Night to Remember (1958)
- North West Frontier (1959)
- Carry On Nurse (1959)
- Tiger Bay (1959)
- The League of Gentlemen (1960)
- Peeping Tom (1960)
- In Search of the Castaways (1962)
- Whistle Down the Wind (1961)
- Dr. No (1962)
- Carry On Cabby (1963)
- From Russia with Love (1963)
- Goldfinger (1964)
- The Moon-Spinners (1964)
- Thunderball (1965)
- The Ipcress File (1965)
- The Heroes of Telemark (1965)
- Devils of Darkness (1965)
- Carry On Screaming! (1966)
- Fahrenheit 451 (1966)
- Arabesque (1966)
- A Countess from Hong Kong (1966)
- Casino Royale (1967)
- You Only Live Twice (1967)
- Carry On Doctor (1967)
- Chitty Chitty Bang Bang (1968)
- Dracula Has Risen from the Grave (1968)
- Battle of Britain (1969)
- Carry On Camping (1969)
- On Her Majesty's Secret Service (1969)
- The Private Life of Sherlock Holmes (1970)
- Twins of Evil (1971)
- Countess Dracula (1971)
- 200 Motels (1971)
- Fiddler on the Roof (1971)
- Diamonds Are Forever (1971)
- Sleuth (1972)
- Madame Sin (1972)
- Baffled! (1972)
- Frenzy (1972)
- The Amazing Mr Blunden (1972)
- Vampire Circus (1972)
- The Day of the Jackal (1973)
- Live and Let Die (1973)
- The Man with the Golden Gun (1974)
- Rollerball (1975)
- One of Our Dinosaurs Is Missing (1975)
- The Man Who Would Be King (1975)
- Bugsy Malone (1976)
- The People That Time Forgot (1977)
- The Spy Who Loved Me (1977)
- Sinbad and the Eye of the Tiger (1977)
- Superman (1978)
- Death on the Nile (1978)
- Warlords of Atlantis (1978)
- Alien (1979)
- The Watcher in the Woods (1980)
- Superman II (1980)
- Dragonslayer (1981)
- For Your Eyes Only (1981)
- Clash of the Titans (1981)
- Pink Floyd – The Wall (1982)
- Trail of the Pink Panther (1982)
- Victor Victoria (1982)
- Curse of the Pink Panther (1983)
- Krull (1983)
- Octopussy (1983)
- Superman III (1983)
- Top Secret! (1984)
- Supergirl (1984)
- Santa Claus: The Movie (1985)
- A View to a Kill (1985)
- Legend (1985)
- Spies Like Us (1985)
- Little Shop of Horrors (1986)
- Aliens (1986)
- Superman IV: The Quest for Peace (1987)
- The Living Daylights (1987)
- Hellraiser (1987)
- Full Metal Jacket (1987)
- Consuming Passions (1988)
- The Adventures of Baron Munchausen (1988)
- A Dry White Season (1988)
- Batman (1989)
- Slipstream (1989)
- Air America (1990)
- Chicago Joe and the Showgirl (1990)
- Memphis Belle (1990)
- Nightbreed (1990)
- The Russia House (1990)
- White Hunter Black Heart (1990)
- Eye of the Widow (1991)
- Kafka (1991)
- King Ralph (1991)
- Let Him Have It (1991)
- 1492: Conquest of Paradise (1992)
- Alien 3 (1992)
- Carry on Columbus (1992)
- Patriot Games (1992)
- Shining Through (1992)
- Year of the Comet (1992)
- The Secret Garden (1993)
- U.F.O. (1993)
- Black Beauty (1994)
- Death Machine (1994)
- Interview with the Vampire (1994)
- Sister My Sister (1994)
- Blue Juice (1995)
- Cutthroat Island (1995)
- The Englishman Who Went Up a Hill But Came Down a Mountain (1995)
- First Knight (1995)
- Hackers (1995)
- Jack and Sarah (1995)
- Just Cause (1995)
- Emma (1996)
- Evita (1996)
- Mary Reilly (1996)
- Mission: Impossible (1996)
- Event Horizon (1997)
- FairyTale: A True Story (1997)
- Fierce Creatures (1997)
- The Fifth Element (1997)
- Firelight (1997 film)
- The Jackal (1997)
- The Saint (1997)
- Tomorrow Never Dies (1997)
- The Avengers (1998)
- The Governess (1998)
- The Negotiator (1998)
- Still Crazy (1998)
- Entrapment (1999)
- Eyes Wide Shut (1999)
- The World Is Not Enough (1999)

=== 2000s–2010s ===
- Proof of Life (2000)
- Quills (2000)
- Snatch (2000)
- Birthday Girl (2001)
- Charlotte Gray (2001)
- Lara Croft: Tomb Raider (2001)
- Last Orders (2001)
- The Mummy Returns (2001)
- My Wife Is an Actress (2001)
- Planet of the Apes (2001)
- 28 Days Later (2002)
- Below (2002)
- Die Another Day (2002)
- The Hours (2002)
- K-19: The Widowmaker (2002)
- Star Wars: Episode II – Attack of the Clones (2002)
- Bright Young Things (2003)
- Lara Croft: Tomb Raider – The Cradle of Life (2003)
- Alexander (2004)
- Alfie (2004)
- Beyond the Sea (2004)
- Chasing Liberty (2004)
- Finding Neverland (2004)
- King Arthur (2004)
- Ladies in Lavender (2004)
- The Phantom of the Opera (2004)
- Thunderbirds (2004)
- Mee-Shee: The Water Giant (2005)
- Charlie and the Chocolate Factory (2005)
- The Descent (2005)
- Goal! (2005)
- Harry Potter and the Goblet of Fire (2005)
- Keeping Mum (2005)
- Nanny McPhee (2005)
- Basic Instinct 2 (2006)
- Cashback (2006)
- Casino Royale (2006)
- Children of Men (2006)
- Eragon (2006)
- Marie Antoinette (2006)
- Penelope (2006)
- Scoop (2006)
- Stormbreaker (2006)
- The Da Vinci Code (2006)
- United 93 (2006)
- V for Vendetta (2006)
- 1408 (2007)
- 28 Weeks Later (2007)
- Ballet Shoes (2007)
- Fred Claus (2007)
- National Treasure: Book of Secrets (2007)
- Stardust (2007)
- Sweeney Todd: The Demon Barber of Fleet Street (2007)
- The Bourne Ultimatum (2007)
- The Bank Job (2008)
- The Dark Knight (2008)
- Donkey Punch (2008)
- The Edge of Love (2008)
- In Bruges (2008)
- Incendiary (2008)
- Inkheart (2008)
- Mamma Mia! (2008)
- Me and Orson Welles (2008)
- Mutant Chronicles (2008)
- The Other Boleyn Girl (2008)
- Quantum of Solace (2008)
- The Boat That Rocked (2009)
- Creation (2009)
- The Imaginarium of Doctor Parnassus (2009)
- Into the Storm (2009)
- Mr. Nobody (2009)
- Sherlock Holmes (2009)
- Basement (2010)
- Centurion (2010)
- The Chronicles of Narnia: The Voyage of the Dawn Treader (2010)
- Clash of the Titans (2010)
- The First Men in the Moon (2010)
- Gulliver's Travels (2010)
- Harry Potter and the Deathly Hallows – Part 1 (2010)
- Hereafter (2010)
- Kick-Ass (2010)
- Prince of Persia: The Sands of Time (2010)
- The Special Relationship (2010)
- Tamara Drewe (2010)
- Wild Target (2010)
- The Wolfman (2010)
- You Will Meet a Tall Dark Stranger (2010)
- Captain America: The First Avenger (2011)
- Harry Potter and the Deathly Hallows – Part 2 (2011)
- Hugo (2011)
- The Iron Lady (2011)
- Jane Eyre (2011)
- Johnny English Reborn (2011)
- My Week with Marilyn (2011)
- One Day (2011)
- Pirates of the Caribbean: On Stranger Tides (2011)
- Sherlock Holmes: A Game of Shadows (2011)
- X-Men: First Class (2011)
- Dark Shadows (2012)
- Dark Tide (2012)
- Great Expectations (2012)
- The Hobbit: An Unexpected Journey (2012)
- Les Misérables (2012)
- Prometheus (2012)
- Skyfall (2012)
- Snow White and the Huntsman (2012)
- The Woman in Black (2012)
- 47 Ronin (2013)
- A Good Day to Die Hard (2013)
- Belle (2013)
- Dom Hemingway (2013)
- Gravity (2013)
- The Harry Hill Movie (2013)
- The Invisible Woman (2013)
- Kick-Ass 2 (2013)
- Last Passenger (2013)
- Red 2 (2013)
- A Little Chaos (2014)
- A Long Way Down (2014)
- Black Sea (2014)
- Decline of an Empire (2014)
- Edge of Tomorrow (2014)
- Exodus: Gods and Kings (2014)
- Fury (2014)
- Guardians of the Galaxy (2014)
- The Hobbit: The Battle of the Five Armies (2014)
- Jack Ryan: Shadow Recruit (2014)
- Maleficent (2014)
- Muppets Most Wanted (2014)
- The Riot Club (2014)
- Testament of Youth (2014)
- Vampire Academy (2014)
- Avengers: Age of Ultron (2015)
- Cinderella (2015)
- Eddie the Eagle (2015)
- Everest (2015)
- Ex Machina (2015)
- In the Heart of the Sea (2015)
- Kingsman: The Secret Service (2015)
- Legend (2015)
- The Man from U.N.C.L.E. (2015)
- Mission: Impossible – Rogue Nation (2015)
- Mortdecai (2015)
- Pan (2015)
- Spectre (2015)
- Star Wars: The Force Awakens (2015)
- Survivor (2015)
- Victor Frankenstein (2015)
- Assassin's Creed (2016)
- Bridget Jones's Baby (2016)
- Criminal (2016)
- Doctor Strange (2016)
- Eddie the Eagle (2016)
- Grimsby (2016)
- London Has Fallen (2016)
- Me Before You (2016)
- Mechanic: Resurrection (2016)
- Miss Peregrine's Home for Peculiar Children (2016)
- Pride and Prejudice and Zombies (2016)
- Rogue One (2016)
- The BFG (2016)
- The Huntsman: Winter's War (2016)
- The Infiltrator (2016)
- Their Finest (2016)
- The Jungle Book (2016)
- Bitter Harvest (2017)
- Film Stars Don't Die in Liverpool (2017)
- Journey's End (2017)
- Kingsman: The Golden Circle (2017)
- On Chesil Beach (2017)
- Paddington 2 (2017)
- Star Wars: The Last Jedi (2017)
- The Mummy (2017)
- The Snowman (2017)
- Transformers: The Last Knight (2017)
- Tulip Fever (2017)
- Annihilation (2018)
- Christopher Robin (2018)
- Holmes & Watson (2018)
- Jurassic World: Fallen Kingdom (2018)
- Mary Poppins Returns (2018)
- Mary Queen of Scots (2018)
- Mowgli: Legend of the Jungle (2018)
- Solo: A Star Wars Story (2018)
- Stan & Ollie (2018)
- The Commuter (2018)
- The Nutcracker and the Four Realms (2018)
- Angel Has Fallen (2019)
- Dumbo (2019)
- Judy (2019)
- Maleficent: Mistress of Evil (2019)
- Rocketman (2019)
- Star Wars: The Rise of Skywalker (2019)
- The Informer (2019)
- 47 Meters Down: Uncaged (2019)

=== 2020s to present ===
- Blithe Spirit (2020)
- Dolittle (2020)
- Emma (2020)
- Horizon Line (2020)
- I Care a Lot (2020)
- The Midnight Sky (2020)
- The One and Only Ivan (2020)
- The Secret Garden (2020)
- Black Widow (2021)
- Cinderella (2021)
- Eternals (2021)
- Last Night in Soho (2021)
- No Time to Die (2021)
- The Dig (2021)
- Venom: Let There Be Carnage (2021)
- Catherine Called Birdy (2022)
- Disenchanted (2022)
- Jurassic World Dominion (2022)
- Morbius (2022)
- Ant-Man and the Wasp: Quantumania (2023)
- A Haunting in Venice (2023)
- Indiana Jones and the Dial of Destiny (2023)
- Meg 2: The Trench (2023)
- Mission: Impossible – Dead Reckoning Part One (2023)
- Napoleon (2023)
- The Boys in the Boat (2023)
- The Creator (2023)
- The Little Mermaid (2023)
- The Marvels (2023)
- One Life (2023)
- Wicked Little Letters (2023)
- Damsel (2024)
- Deadpool & Wolverine (2024)
- Here (2024)
- Sonic the Hedgehog 3 (2024)
- Black Bag (2025)
- The Gorge (2025)
- Snow White (2025)
- The Amateur (2025)
- Thunderbolts* (2025)
- Echo Valley (2025)
- The Fantastic Four: First Steps (2025)
- The Roses (2025)
- The Woman in Cabin 10 (2025)
- Spider-Man: Brand New Day (2026)
- Mutiny (2026)
- The Dog Stars (2026)
- Up Against It (2026)
- Digger (2026)
- Above the Below (2026)
- Avengers: Doomsday (2026)
- Anxious People (TBA)

=== Other productions ===
Films that utilized the Studios for post-production services, or in an undefined way.

- Mandela: Long Walk to Freedom (2013)
- Trash (2014)
- Far from the Madding Crowd (2015)
- Steve Jobs (2015)
- I, Daniel Blake (2016)
- Jason Bourne (2016)
- Suburbicon (2017)
- T2 Trainspotting (2017)
- Adrift (2018)
- Been So Long (2018)
- Mary Magdalene (2018)
- Roma (2018)
- The Gentlemen (2019)
- Yesterday (2019)
- Peter Rabbit 2: The Runaway (2021)
- Aftersun (2022)
- Beast (2022)
- Men (2022)
- Ticket to Paradise (2022)
- Top Gun: Maverick (2022)
- Freelance (2023)
- Operation Fortune: Ruse de Guerre (2023)
- Pain Hustlers (2023)
- Saltburn (2023)
- Sharper (2023)
- Civil War (2024)
- Joy (2024)
- Paddington in Peru (2024)
- Warfare (2025)
- Night Always Comes (2025)
- Tinsel Town (2025)
- 28 Years Later: The Bone Temple (2026)
- Pretty Lethal (2026)
- Apex (2026)
- In the Grey (2026)
- The Runner (2026)
- Hadestown: The Musical (2026)
- Clayface (2026)

=== Television ===
- EastEnders
- Emmerdale
- Extras
- Little Charley Bear
- The IT Crowd
- Midsomer Murders
- UFO (1970)
- The Persuaders (1970–1971)
- Space: 1999 (1975–1977)
- Parallel 9 (1992–1994)
- Space Precinct (1994-1995)
- Potamus Park (1995–1999)
- You Bet! (1996)
- Teletubbies (1997–2001)
- Bob the Builder (1998–2004)
- My Family (2000–2011)
- The Weakest Link (2001–2009)
- Bob the Builder: Project: Build It (2005–2008)
- Terry Pratchett's The Colour of Magic (2008)
- Would I Lie to You? (2009–)
- 10 O'Clock Live (2011–2013)
- Sing If You Can (2011)
- Big School (2013–2014)
- Through the Keyhole
- Count Arthur Strong (2013–)
- 8 Out of 10 Cats (2013–)
- The National Lottery Draws (2013–)
- The Voice UK (2013; live shows only)
- The Taste (2014)
- Duck Quacks Don't Echo (2014–)
- Birds of a Feather (2014–)
- Red Dwarf (2015–2020)
- The Great American Baking Show (2015–)
- Still Open All Hours (2015–2019)
- Debatable (2016–)
- Taskmaster (2017–2025)
- Tenable (2017–)
- Not Going Out (2017–)
- Black Narcissus (2020)
- Cursed (2020)
- Red Dwarf: The Promised Land (2020)
- RuPaul's Drag Race UK (2020, 2022–)
- The Nevers (2021)
- Andor (2022–2025)
- Gordon Ramsay's Future Food Stars (2022–2023)
- Willow (2022)
- Citadel (2023)
- Secret Invasion (2023)
- Loki (2023)
- Lockwood & Co. (2023)
- Knuckles (2024)
- My Lady Jane (2024)
- Brian and Maggie (2025)
- VisionQuest (2026)
- Bill's Included (2026)
- Star Wars: Ahsoka (Season Two)
- Alien: Earth (TBA)

==== Other productions ====
Television shows that utilized the Studios for post-production services, or in an undefined way.

- The Lord of the Rings: The Rings of Power (Season 2)
- What It Feels Like for a Girl (2025)

== Shepperton Studios ==
=== 1930s–1990s ===
- Reunion (1932)
- The Ghoul (1933)
- Menace (1934)
- Colonel Blood (1934)
- Rolling Home (1935)
- Sanders of the River (1935)
- Birds of a Feather (1936)
- Reasonable Doubt (1936)
- Second Bureau (1936)
- It's Never Too Late to Mend (1937)
- The Fallen Idol (1948)
- The Third Man (1949)
- Gone To Earth (1950)
- The Tales of Hoffmann (1951)
- The Holly and the Ivy (1952)
- An Inspector Calls (1954)
- Richard III (1955)
- The End of the Affair (1955)
- It's a Wonderful World (1956)
- A King in New York (1957)
- The Passionate Stranger (1957)
- Suddenly, Last Summer (1959)
- Left, Right and Centre (1959)
- Mysterious Island (1961)
- The Guns of Navarone (1961)
- The Innocents (1961)
- Lawrence of Arabia (1962)
- The Painted Smile (1962)
- The Prince and the Pauper (1962)
- The Road to Hong Kong (1962)
- The Servant (1963)
- The Mouse on the Moon (1963)
- Heavens Above! (1963)
- Billy the Liar (1963)
- Dr. Strangelove (1964)
- Becket (1964)
- The Spy Who Came In from the Cold (1965)
- Dr. Who and the Daleks (1965)
- The Bedford Incident (1965)
- Lord Jim (1965)
- Daleks' Invasion Earth 2150 A.D. (1966)
- Georgy Girl (1966)
- Casino Royale (1967)
- Fathom (1967)
- The Girl on a Motorcycle (1968)
- 2001: A Space Odyssey (1968)
- Oliver! (1968)
- Scrooge (1970)
- Wuthering Heights (1970)
- Dad's Army (1971)
- Young Winston (1972)
- Alice's Adventures in Wonderland (1972 film) (1972)
- Psychomania (1973)
- Great Expectations (1974)
- The Return of the Pink Panther (1975)
- The Omen (1976)
- Star Wars (1977)
- The Boys from Brazil (1978)
- The Man Who Fell to Earth (1978)
- Superman (1978)
- Force 10 from Navarone (1978)
- Alien (1979)
- The Kids Are Alright (1979)
- The Martian Chronicles (TV miniseries, 1979)
- The Elephant Man (1980)
- Flash Gordon (1980)
- Saturn 3 (1980)
- Ragtime (1981)
- Blade Runner (1982)
- Gandhi (1982)
- The Hound of the Baskervilles (1983)
- The Pirates of Penzance (1983)
- A Passage to India (1984)
- The Company of Wolves (1984)
- Out of Africa (1985)
- The Bride (1985)
- The Princess Bride (1987)
- Cry Freedom (1987)
- Gorillas in the Mist (1988)
- Henry V (1989)
- Hamlet (1990)
- Nuns on the Run (1990)
- Three Men and a Little Lady (1990)
- Robin Hood: Prince of Thieves (1991)
- Chaplin (1992)
- The Crying Game (1992)
- The Muppet Christmas Carol (1992)
- Four Weddings and a Funeral (1994)
- The Madness of King George (1994)
- Mary Shelley's Frankenstein (1994)
- Judge Dredd (1995)
- Restoration (1995)
- Sense and Sensibility (1995)
- Evita (1996)
- Hamlet (1996)
- In Love and War (1996)
- Muppet Treasure Island (1996)
- The Wind in the Willows (1996)
- 101 Dalmatians (1996)
- G.I. Jane (1997)
- The Borrowers (1997)
- Elizabeth (1998)
- Lost in Space (1998)
- The Parent Trap (1998)
- Shakespeare in Love (1998)
- The Mummy (1999)
- Notting Hill (1999)
- Sleepy Hollow (1999)

=== 2000s–2010s ===
- 102 Dalmatians (2000)
- Bedazzled (2000)
- Billy Elliot (2000)
- Chocolat (2000)
- Gladiator (2000)
- Bridget Jones's Diary (2001)
- Gosford Park (2001)
- Just Visiting (2001)
- Spy Game (2001)
- The Mummy Returns (2001)
- About a Boy (2002)
- Bend It Like Beckham (2002)
- Dirty Pretty Things (2002)
- Harry Potter and the Chamber of Secrets (2002)
- The Four Feathers (2002)
- Love Actually (2003)
- The Life of David Gale (2003)
- Bridget Jones: The Edge of Reason (2004)
- Finding Neverland (2004)
- Harry Potter and the Prisoner of Azkaban (2004)
- Troy (2004)
- Wimbledon (2004)
- Batman Begins (2005)
- Harry Potter and the Goblet of Fire (2005)
- The Hitchhiker's Guide to the Galaxy (2005)
- Mrs Henderson Presents (2005)
- Sahara (2005)
- Star Wars: Episode III – Revenge of the Sith (2005)
- The Da Vinci Code (2006)
- Atonement (2007)
- Elizabeth: The Golden Age (2007)
- The Golden Compass (2007)
- Doomsday (2008)
- How to Lose Friends & Alienate People (2008)
- The Mummy: Tomb of the Dragon Emperor (2008)
- Mutant Chronicles (2008)
- Slumdog Millionaire (2008)
- The Spiderwick Chronicles (2008)
- Angels & Demons (2009)
- Cheri (2009)
- Inkheart (2009)
- Moon (2009)
- Nine (2009)
- The Boat That Rocked (2009)
- The Young Victoria (2009)
- Centurion (2010)
- Clash of the Titans (2010)
- Iron Man 2 (2010)
- Nanny McPhee and the Big Bang (2010)
- Robin Hood (2010)
- Captain America: The First Avenger (2011)
- Hugo (2011)
- Jane Eyre (2011)
- Sherlock Holmes: A Game of Shadows (2011)
- Anna Karenina (2012)
- Wrath of the Titans (2012)
- John Carter (2012)
- 47 Ronin (2013)
- Fast & Furious 6 (2013)
- Gravity (2013)
- Mandela: Long Walk to Freedom (2013)
- Jack the Giant Slayer (2013)
- Thor: The Dark World (2013)
- World War Z (2013)
- Guardians of the Galaxy (2014)
- Hercules (2014)
- Into the Woods (2014)
- Paddington (2014)
- Avengers: Age of Ultron (2015)
- The Lady in the Van (2015)
- Molly Moon and the Incredible Book of Hypnotism (2015)
- Mr. Holmes (2015)
- Victor Frankenstein (2015)
- Alice Through the Looking Glass (2016)
- Doctor Strange (2016)
- Patient Zero (2016)
- Pride and Prejudice and Zombies (2016)
- Beauty and the Beast (2017)
- Life (2017)
- Pirates of the Caribbean: Dead Men Tell No Tales (2017)
- The Sense of an Ending (2017)
- Christopher Robin (2018)
- Holmes & Watson (2018)
- Mamma Mia! Here We Go Again (2018)
- Mary Poppins Returns (2018)
- The Nutcracker and the Four Realms (2018)
- Detective Pikachu (2019)
- Downton Abbey (2019)
- Dumbo (2019)
- The Hustle (2019)
- Fighting with My Family (2019)
- The Good Liar (2019)
- Fast & Furious Presents: Hobbs & Shaw (2019)
- Rocketman (2019)
- 1917 (2019)

=== 2020s to present ===
- Come Away (2020)
- Dolittle (2020)
- The Old Guard (2020)
- The Midnight Sky (2020)
- Cruella (2021)
- The Bubble (2022)
- Matilda the Musical (2022)
- Enola Holmes 2 (2022)
- Heart of Stone (2023)
- Luther: The Fallen Sun (2023)
- Gladiator II (2024)
- Atlas (2024)
- Lift (2024)
- The Union (2024)
- Back in Action (2025)
- The Thursday Murder Club (2025)
- After the Hunt (2025)
- Jay Kelly (2025)
- The Woman in Cabin 10 (2025)
- The Family Plan 2 (2025)
- Peaky Blinders: The Immortal Man (2026)
- Project Hail Mary (2026)
- The Sheep Detectives (2026)
- Ladies First (2026)
- Enola Holmes 3 (2026)
- The Last House (2026)
- The Beekeeper 2 (2027)
- The Thomas Crown Affair (2027)
- Narnia: The Magician's Nephew (2027)

=== Television ===
- Thomas & Friends (1986–2008) (Series 2-12)
- TUGS (1989)
- You Bet! (1988; 1990–1995)
- Last of the Summer Wine (1990–2010)
- The Crystal Maze (1990)
- Red Dwarf (1991–1999; 2009; 2012)
- The Vicar of Dibley (1994–2000)
- Rebecca (1997)
- Big Ticket (1998)
- Gladiators (2008–2009)
- Dancing on Ice (2011)
- 8 Out of 10 Cats (2014)
- Russell Howard's Good News (2014)
- 1899 (2022)
- Anatomy of a Scandal (2022)
- The Sandman (2022-25)
- The Regime (2024)
- 3 Body Problem (2024)
- Bridgerton (2024)
- The Perfect Couple (2024)
- The Devil's Hour (2024)
- Black Mirror (2025)
- The Abandons (2025)
- Unchosen (2026)
- The Lord of the Rings: The Rings of Power (Season Three)
- Tomb Raider (TBA)

== Pinewood Studios, Atlanta (2013–2020) ==
=== Films ===
- Ant-Man (2015)
- Captain America: Civil War (2016)
- Passengers (2016)
- Guardians of the Galaxy Vol. 2 (2017)
- Spider-Man: Homecoming (2017)
- Krystal (2017)
- Black Panther (2018)
- Avengers: Infinity War (2018)
- Ant-Man and the Wasp (2018)
- Avengers: Endgame (2019)
- Zombieland: Double Tap (2019)
- The Tomorrow War (2021)
- The Suicide Squad (2021)

=== Television series ===
- Moon and Me (2019)
- The Walking Dead (S9E16: "The Storm") (2019)
- Love Is Blind (2020)
- WandaVision (2021)
- The Falcon and the Winter Soldier (2021)
- Loki (2021)

== Pinewood Studios, Toronto ==
- It's a Boy Girl Thing (2006)
- Chloe (2009)
- Scott Pilgrim vs. the World (2010)
- 388 Arletta Avenue (2011)
- Dream House (2011)
- Take This Waltz (2011)
- The Thing (2011)
- Cosmopolis (2012)
- Prometheus (2012)
- Red Lights (2012)
- The Vow (2012)
- Total Recall (2012)
- Carrie (2013)
- Kick-Ass 2 (2013)
- Mama (2013)
- Pacific Rim (2013)
- The Best Man Holiday (2013)
- The Colony (2013)
- RoboCop (2014)
- The Captive (2014)
- Wolves (2014)
- Wet Bum (2014)
- Debug (2014)
- Crimson Peak (2015)
- He Never Died (2015)
- Pixels (2015)
- Poltergeist (2015)
- Regression (2015)
- Room (2015)
- Spotlight (2015)
- Special Correspondents (2016)
- Suicide Squad (2016)
- Downsizing (2017)
- Flatliners (2017)
- It (2017)
- Molly's Game (2017)
- A Simple Favor (2018)
- XXX: Return of Xander Cage (2017)
- The Christmas Chronicles (2018)
- It Chapter Two (2019)
- Let It Snow (2019)
- Scary Stories to Tell in the Dark (2019)
- Shazam! (2019)
- Nightmare Alley (2021)
- Slumberland (2022)
- Thanksgiving (2023)
- Code 8: Part II (2024)
- The Apprentice (2024)
- Star Trek: Section 31 (2025)
- Frankenstein (2025)

=== Television ===
- Battle of the Blades (2009–2013)
- The Listener (2009–2014)
- Happy Town (2010)
- Beauty & the Beast (2012–2016)
- Orphan Black (2013–2017)
- The Strain (2014–2017)
- Good Witch (2015–2021)
- Schitt's Creek (2015–2020)
- Star Trek: Discovery (2017–2024)
- Jupiter's Legacy (2021)
- FUBAR (2023)
- The Madness (2024)
- Overcompensating (2025-27)
- Adults (2025-26)
- Gen V (Season Two)
- Star Trek: Starfleet Academy (2026-27)
- The Boys (Season 5)
- Neagley (2026)
- The Terminal List (Season Two)

== Pinewood Studios, Malaysia (2009–2019) ==
- Lost in the Pacific (2015)

=== Television ===
- Marco Polo (2014–16)

== Pinewood Studios, Dominican Republic ==
- XXX: Return of Xander Cage (2017)
- 47 Meters Down (2017)
- If Beale Street Could Talk (2018)
- 47 Meters Down: Uncaged (2019)
- Old (2021)
- The Lost City (2022)
- Shotgun Wedding (2023)
- Nyad (2023)
- Road House (2024)

=== Television ===
- The I-Land (2019)
