= Chernin Entertainment =

American film and television production company

- Logo used since 2011
- Type: Division
- Industry: Film production company
- Founded: February 24, 2009; 17 years ago
- Founder: Peter Chernin
- Headquarters: Los Angeles, California
- Key people: Peter Chernin (CEO); Jenno Topping; (president of Film and Television); David Ready (executive vice president of Film and TV)
- Products: Motion Pictures
- Parent: The Chernin Group (2009–2022); The North Road Company (2022–present)

Chernin Entertainment is an American film and television production company owned by The North Road Company that is based in Los Angeles, California. It was founded on February 24, 2009, by producer and former media executive Peter Chernin, who is chairman and chief executive officer of the company. Jenno Topping is the president of film and television, with David Ready as executive vice president of film and TV. Kristen Campo is executive vice president of television. Twenty-seven films have been produced by the company, most of them with 20th Century Fox (now known as 20th Century Studios).

== History ==
Chernin Entertainment was founded by Peter Chernin after he stepped down as president of Fox's then-parent company News Corporation in 2009. The firm's first film was Rise of the Planet of the Apes in 2011. Chernin Entertainment's five-year first-look deal for the film and television was signed with 20th Century Fox and 20th Century Fox Television in 2009.

In March 2011, after leaving Maguire Entertainment, Jenno Topping joined the company as executive Vice President of film division, and then in February 2013 she was promoted to President of films, vacated by Dylan Clark. David Ready was hired as Senior VP to report to Topping. In June 2015, the company's TV division's president Katherine Pope left the company, while Topping was promoted to President of Film and Television. In August 2015, Dante Di Loreto was hired and appointed as President of Television at the company, reporting to Topping. Kristen Campo joined the company in 2016 to run television after Di Loreto's departure.

In November 2014, the company signed an extension of the first-look deal with 20th Century Fox for film at a less lucrative terms. With only one hit TV show, New Girl, the TV pact was being shopped around. In June 2015, Chernin signed its television production deal for two years with NBCUniversal, in which Chernin would develop and produce projects for NBC though Universal Television. That deal was followed with one with Endeavor Content for a scripted drama pact in 2017.

On January 17, 2020, 20th Century Studios, now under the operation of Walt Disney Studios, ended its production deal with Chernin Entertainment, which had about four years remaining. The move was cited to Disney's preference of self-financing its films, and the studio's mandate of having 20th Century refocus on its franchises. Chernin will continue to work with Disney and 20th Century on the Planet of the Apes franchise and about 9 other films with the studio, while taking 70 out of 80 films in development in the split. On April 7, Chernin made a multi-year first-look deal with Netflix to make films.

In September 2020, Chernin Entertainment signed a multi-year partnership agreement with Spotify to allow the former to adapt films and TV shows from Spotify's original podcast catalog.

In February 2021, Chernin Entertainment announced that it had launched a non-scripted documentary production studio that could produce documentaries both inside and outside the sports genre named Words + Pictures with former ESPN content chief Connor Schell who became the chief executive officer of the new unscripted programme company with Chernin Entertainment's president Jenno Tapping overseeing the company's relationship with them.

On October 27, 2021, Nancy Utley, former veteran of Searchlight Pictures had started Lake Ellyn Entertainment, with a first-look affiliate deal at the studio, and Netflix.

In April 2022, Chernin Entertainment announced that they hired former chairman and CEO of Red Arrow Studios and the president of Westbrook International Jan Frouman in an unspecified role as Chernin Entertainment announced that they were going to expand their film and television operations with them eyeing the acquisition of German production and distribution company Red Arrow Studios from ProSiebenSat.1 Media.

In July 2022, Chernin Entertainment's president & founder and founder of the former's parent The Chernin Group, Peter Chernin, had depatured Chernin Entertainment's latter parent and announced that he had taken his film & television production company Chernin Entertainment & its unscripted production studio Words + Pictures to establish a global independent and production content studio that entitled, The North Road Company, as the two subsidiaries became part of his new company as labels, while the new global company had acquired the US assets of German entertainment & international distribution company Red Arrow Studios from ProSiebenSat.1 Media (which were Kinetic Content, Left/Right Productions, Half Yard Productions, Dorsey Pictures and 44 Blue Productions) and the remaining 50% stake in unscripted documentary production company Words + Pictures with Peter Chernin became CEO & chairman of the new company with Chernin Entertainment president of scripted, Jenno Topping, retained her role president of The North Road Company's scripted studio Chernin Entertainment and started overseeing The North Road Company's scripted film and television operations as president of scripted alongside Words + Pictures' founder, Connor Schell, who had continued running the unscripted production company under North Road and would assume The North Road Company's unscripted operations as head of unscripted. The new global content studio had also established its international division based in London, England, named North Road International, as Jan Frouman (who joined Chernin Entertainment three months prior back in April of that year) became The North Road Company's president as former AMC Networks executive Kirstin Jones joined The North Road Company and became the global studio's president of international film & television and the two would run North Road's new international division with their international office being based in London, England.

In June 2023, The North Road Company announced that they had acquired Istanbul and LA-based Turkish/American film & television drama production company Karga Seven Pictures, marking The North Road Company's first international acquisition and their first international expansion along with their expansion of their international operations into Turkey and reunited Karga Seven Pictures with Red Arrow's former American unscripted production subsidiaries (which were Kinetic Content, Left/Right Productions, Half Yard Productions, Dorsey Pictures, and 44 Blue Productions that North Road acquired a year prior in 2022), with Karga Seven Pictures co-founders & producers Sarah Wetherbee, Emre Sahin and Kelly McPherson continued leading of the acquired Turkish/American production company with Sarah Wetherbee and Emre Sahin becoming global CEOs and Ömer Müjdat Özgüner was hired by Karga Seven Pictures and became the new CEO of the company.

In November 2023, Chernin Entertainment's parent company The North Road Company had announced that they had acquired a majority stake in Los Angeles-based production company Two One Five Entertainment which was led by the co-founders of the hip hop band The Roots Tariq "Black Thought" Trotter and Ahmir "Questlove" Thompson with The North Road Company financing Two One Five Entertainment's future film and television projects along with North Road expanding Two One Five into the scripted business.

In November 2023, The North Road Company announced that it had acquired documentary production company Little Room Films, expanding The North Road Company's operations and would be placed under North Road's unscripted production arm Words + Pictures with the former's founder & director Jason Hehir continued remaining the president of Little Room Films under North Road's unsciprted production unit Words + Pictures.

In January 2025, The North Road Company announced their entry into the Latin American production business by acquiring Mexican television production company Perro Azul, marking North Road's second international production studio acquisition and its first entry into Latin America since their acquisition of Turkish/American drama television studio Karga Seven Pictures two years prior in June 2023 as Mexican television production studio Perro Azul became a subaidiary of The North Road Company with Perro Azul's founders Alexis Fridman and Juan Uruchurtu continued leadering the acquired Mexican production company under North Road. Most recently, the company signed a film deal with Apple TV+.

In January 2026, French media conglomerate Mediawan entered advanced talks to acquire Chernin Entertainment's global entertainment & production content studio & parent The North Road Company including its scripted entertainment production arm Chernin Entertainment, alongside North Road's international division North Road International, minority investment stakes in Omaha Productions and Two One Five Entertainment, Turkish/American drama production company Karga Seven Pictures, Mexican scripted television studio Perro Azul and its unscripted production operations which were Words + Pictures (including its subsidiary Little Room Films), Kinetic Content and 44 Blue Productions from its founder Peter Chernin that would expand Mediawan's American production operations. A week later on the 30th in that same month, Mediawan confirmed that they had acquired Chernin Entertainment's global entertainment production & distribution parent The North Road Company alongside its scripted entertainment production arm Chernin Entertainment, including North Road's international distribution arm North Road International, their minority stakes in Omaha Productions and Two One Five Entertainment, Turkish/American drama production company Karga Seven Pictures, Mexican scripted television studio Perro Azul and its unscripted production operations which were Words + Pictures (alongside its subsidiary Little Room Films), Kinetic Content and 44 Blue Productions from its founder Peter Chernin, the acquisition of The North Road Company had gained Mediawan access to the Mexican & Turkish film & television production activities and expanding its American production operations with North Road became Mediawan's American production subsidiary whilst the latter's founder Peter Chernin joined Mediawan's board and continued leading North Road as non-executive chairman under Mediawan, Chernin Entertainment had also become part of Mediawan as a subsidiary.

== Production ==
Chernin Entertainment produces for television and film.

The company's first feature film, Rise of the Planet of the Apes, was released in August 2011 and has grossed more than $480 million at the worldwide box office. It has also produced Parental Guidance, a comedy starring Billy Crystal and Bette Midler, which was released in December 2012, the sci-fi thriller from Joseph Kosinski, Oblivion, starring Tom Cruise, and The Heat, starring Melissa McCarthy and Sandra Bullock.

== Films ==
=== 2010s ===
Year	Title	Director	Distributor	Notes	Budget	Gross
2011	Rise of the Planet of the Apes	Rupert Wyatt	20th Century Fox	co-production with Dune Entertainment, Big Screen Productions and Ingenious Film Partners	$93 million	$481.8 million
2012	Parental Guidance	Andy Fickman	20th Century Fox	co-production with Walden Media, Face Productions and Dune Entertainment	$25 million	$120.8 million
2013	Oblivion	Joseph Kosinski	Universal Pictures	co-production with Relativity Media, Monolith Pictures and Radical Studios	$120 million	$286.2 million
2013	The Heat	Paul Feig	20th Century Fox		$43 million	$229.9 million
2014	Dawn of the Planet of the Apes	Matt Reeves	20th Century Fox		$170–235 million	$710.6 million
2014	The Drop	Michael R. Roskam	Fox Searchlight Pictures		$12.6 million	$18.7 million
2014	St. Vincent	Theodore Melfi	The Weinstein Company	co-production with Crescendo Productions	$13 million	$54.8 million
2014	Exodus: Gods and Kings	Ridley Scott	20th Century Fox	co-production with Scott Free Productions	$140–200 million	$268.2 million
2015	Spy	Paul Feig	20th Century Fox	co-production with Feigco Entertainment	$65 million	$235.7 million
2016	Mike and Dave Need Wedding Dates	Jake Szymanski	20th Century Fox		$33–35 million	$77.1 million
2016	Miss Peregrine's Home for Peculiar Children	Tim Burton	20th Century Fox	co-production with Tim Burton Productions, Scope Pictures, St. Petersburg Clearwater Film Commission and Ingenious	$110 million	$296.5 million
2016	Hidden Figures	Theodore Melfi	20th Century Fox	co-production with Fox 2000 Pictures and Levantine Films	$25 million	$236 million
2017	Snatched	Jonathan Levine	20th Century Fox	co-production with Feigco Entertainment	$42 million	$60.8 million
2017	War for the Planet of the Apes	Matt Reeves	20th Century Fox		$150 million	$490.7 million
2017	The Mountain Between Us	Hany Abu-Assad	20th Century Fox	co-production with Fox 2000 Pictures	$35 million	$62.8 million
2017	The Greatest Showman	Michael Gracey	20th Century Fox	co-production with Laurence Mark Productions	$84 million	$435 million
2018	Red Sparrow	Francis Lawrence	20th Century Fox		$69 million	$151.6 million
2019	Tolkien	Dome Karukoski	Fox Searchlight Pictures		$20 million	$9 million
2019	Ford v Ferrari	James Mangold	20th Century Fox	co-production with Turnpike Films	$97.6 million	$225.5 million
2019	Spies in Disguise	Nick Bruno; Troy Quane	20th Century Fox	co-production with 20th Century Fox, Blue Sky Studios and 20th Century Fox Animation	$100 million	$171.6 million

=== 2020s ===
Year	Title	Director	Distributor	Notes	Budget	Gross
2020	Underwater	William Eubank	20th Century Fox	co-production with 20th Century Fox	$50–80 million	$40.9 million
2021	Fear Street Part One: 1994	Leigh Janiak	Netflix			
2021	Fear Street Part Two: 1978	Leigh Janiak	Netflix		$10 million	
2021	Fear Street Part Three: 1666	Leigh Janiak	Netflix		$10 million	
2022	Slumberland	Francis Lawrence	Netflix		$150 million	
2023	Luther: The Fallen Sun	Jamie Payne	Netflix	co-production with BBC Film		
2023	Dicks: The Musical	Larry Charles	A24		$8 million	$1.4 million
2024	Kingdom of the Planet of the Apes	Wes Ball	20th Century Studios	uncredited; co-production with OddBall Entertainment and Jason T. Reed Productions	$120–160 million	$397.4 million
2024	Rez Ball	Sydney Freeland	Netflix	co-production with SpringHill Company, Wise Entertainment and Lake Ellyn Entertainment		
2025	Back in Action	Seth Gordon	Netflix	co-production with Exhibit A and Good One Productions	$207.2 million (gross) $158.9 million (net)	
2025	Fear Street: Prom Queen	Matt Palmer	Netflix			
2026	Apex	Baltasar Kormákur	Netflix	co-production with Ian Bryce Productions, Denver and Delilah Productions and RVK Studios		
2026	Backrooms	Kane Parsons	A24	co-production with 21 Laps Entertainment, Atomic Monster and Phobos; credited as North Road Films	<$10 million	$401 million
2026	The Last House	Louis Leterrier	Netflix	co-production with 3 Arts Entertainment, Thank You Studios, Rocket Science and Carousel Studios		
2026	Heartland	Shana Feste	Netflix	co-production with Sandbox Studios		

=== Upcoming ===
Year	Title	Director	Distributor	Notes
TBA	Altar	Egor Abramenko	A24	
TBA	The Big Fix	Baltasar Kormákur	Netflix	
TBA	A Bittersweet Life	TBA	Netflix	
TBA	Five Secrets	TBA	Apple Original Films	co-production with Apple Studios
TBA	The Flick	TBA	Apple Original Films	co-production with Apple Studios
TBA	The Game of Life	Sean Anders	Amazon MGM Studios	co-production with Hasbro Entertainment
TBA	The Goon	Patrick Osbourne	Netflix	co-production with Netflix Animation, Blur Studio and Dark Horse Entertainment
TBA	High Side	James Mangold	Paramount Pictures	
TBA	Last Flight Out	Sam Hargrave	Apple Original Films	co-production with Dark Horse Entertainment
TBA	Luther 3	Jamie Payne	Netflix	co-production with BBC Film
TBA	Mega Man	Henry Joost; Ariel Schulman	Netflix	co-production with Capcom
TBA	One Month Mark	Gene Stupnitsky	Apple Original Films	co-production with Excellent Cadaver
TBA	Palm Grove	Kornél Mundruczó	TBA	
TBA	Popeye	TBA	20th Century Studios	King Features
TBA	Sacrament	Jonathan Levine	Apple Original Films	co-production with Apple Studios, Keep Quiet Entertainment and MegaMix
TBA	Sidekicks	TBA	Paramount Pictures	co-production with Twin Ink
TBA	Untitled The Fly film	Nikyatu Jusu	20th Century Studios	

== Television ==
=== 2010s ===
Years	Title	Creator(s)	Network	Notes	Seasons	Episodes
2011–2012	Breakout Kings	Nick Santora; Matt Olmstead	A&E	co-production with Matt Olmstead Productions, Blackjack Films and Fox 21	2	23
2011–2012	Terra Nova	Kelly Marcel; Craig Silverstein	Fox	co-production with Amblin Television, Kapital Entertainment, Siesta Productions and 20th Century Fox Television	1	13
2011	Allen Gregory	Jonah Hill; Andrew Mogel; Jarrad Paul	Fox	co-production with Bento Box Entertainment, Jonah Hill Films, A J. Paul/A. Mogel/D. Goodman Piece of Business and 20th Century Fox Television	1	7
2011–2018	New Girl	Elizabeth Meriwether	Fox	co-production with Elizabeth Meriwether Pictures, American Nitwits and 20th Century Fox Television	7	146
2012–2013	Touch	Tim Kring	Fox	co-production with Tailwind Productions and 20th Century Fox Television	2	26
2012–2013	Ben and Kate	Dana Fox	Fox	co-production with Hemingway Drive Productions and 20th Century Fox Television	1	16
2019–2022	See	Steven Knight	Apple TV+	co-production with about:blank, Quaker Moving Pictures, Endeavor Content and Nebula Star	3	24
2019–2023	Truth Be Told	Nichelle Tramble Spellman	Apple TV+	co-production with Orit Entertainment, Hello Sunshine, Endeavor Content and With a N	3	28

=== 2020s ===
Year	Title	Creator(s)	Network	Notes	Seasons	Episodes
2020–present	P-Valley	Katori Hall	Starz	season 1 only; co-production with Kat Buggy Productions and Lionsgate Television (season 2)	2	18
2021	Bombay Begums	Alankrita Shrivastava, Bornila Chatterjee and Iti Agarwa	Netflix	co-production with Endemol Shine Group	1	6
2024	Exploding Kittens	Matthew Inman and Shane Kosakowski	Netflix	co-production with Chomp City, Jam Filled Entertainment and Bandera Entertainment	1	9
2024	The Madness	Stephen Belber	Netflix	co-production with Sin Video and BelBer Prod.	1	8
2025	Chief of War	Jason Momoa and Thomas Pa'a Sibbett	Apple TV+	co-production with Pride of Gypsies, Hard J Productions, about:blank and Fifth Season	1	8
2026	Man on Fire	Kyle Killen	Netflix	co-production with New Regency Productions, Chapter Eleven and RedRum	1	7

=== Upcoming ===
Year	Title	Creator(s)	Network	Notes	Seasons	Episodes
2026	The Body	Quinn Shephard	Netflix	co-production with The North Road Company and Felix Culpa	1	8
