= David Reidy =

David Reidy may refer to:

- David Reidy (Clare hurler) (born 1995), Irish hurler
- David Reidy (Limerick hurler) (born 1993), Irish hurler
- David Reidy (professor) (born 1962), American philosopher and professor at University of Tennessee
- David Ready, American film producer
