= The Big Fix (upcoming film) =

American crime thriller film

- Directed by: Baltasar Kormákur
- Written by: Guy Bolton; Justin Haythe
- Produced by: Peter Chernin; Baltasar Kormákur; David Ready; Samantha Nisenboim
- Starring: Riz Ahmed; Mark Wahlberg; Zlatko Burić; Chin Han; Vipin Sharma
- Production company: Chernin Entertainment
- Distributed by: Netflix
- Country: United States
- Language: English

The Big Fix is an upcoming American crime thriller film directed by Baltasar Kormákur and starring Riz Ahmed, Mark Wahlberg, Zlatko Burić, Chin Han and Vipin Sharma. It marks the third collaboration between Wahlberg and Kormákur, following Contraband and 2 Guns.

The premise of the film is that a former Interpol officer working inside the Fédération Internationale de Football Association (FIFA) uncovers a global match-fixing operation. What begins as an investigation quickly escalates into a high-stakes pursuit, as he closes in on a well-connected fixer aligned with Chinese Triads.

== Cast ==
- Riz Ahmed
- Mark Wahlberg as Chris Eaton: A former police officer who helps uncover the scandal while serving as top enforcement agent at FIFA
- Zlatko Burić
- Chin Han as Dan Tan
- Bobo Le
- Paul G. Raymond
- Nuha Jes Izman
- Nathan Rhys Murray
- Vipin Sharma
- Natalie Dormer
- Richard Pyros
- Susan Lynch
- Gabriel Leone

== Production ==
In January 2016, it was announced that Adil El Arbi and Bilall Fallah would co-direct The Big Fix, based on Brett Forrest's 2012 ESPN Magazine article "All The World Is Staged"; 20th Century Fox would distribute. Ten years later, the project was resurrected with Baltasar Kormákur producing and directing the film from a screenplay written by Guy Bolton and Justin Haythe; Riz Ahmed and Mark Wahlberg were set to star with Netflix distributing.

Filming began in April 2026 in Sydney, Australia; additional castings included Zlatko Burić, Chin Han, Bobo Le, Paul G. Raymond, Nuha Jes Izman, Vipin Sharma, Natalie Dormer, Susan Lynch, Gabriel Leone and Rameez Ahmed.

Filming took place in Malaysia for two weeks in July 2026, including in Penang.
