= Malaria No More UK =

UK health charity

Malaria No More UK is a charity working to combat malaria in Africa. The Malaria No More UK office is located in London.

== Overview ==
Malaria No More UK launched in 2009. The charity is made up of a small team working on advocacy, communications & fundraising projects across the UK & Africa.

== Board of trustees ==
Malaria No More UK is run by an Executive Director, who reports to a Board of Trustees including entrepreneur Heather Rabbatts; Peter Chernin, Co-founder of Malaria No More and Simon Fuller, founder of XIX Entertainment.

== International networks ==
Malaria No More was founded in the US at the White House Summit on Malaria in 2006 by former News Corporation President Peter Chernin and Wall Street pioneer Ray Chambers, now the first UN Special Envoy on Malaria. Malaria No More Affiliates operate in the UK, US, Netherlands, Canada and, Japan and together they form part of a growing global network of organisations tackling malaria under the Roll Back Malaria Partnership, including the Global Fund to Fight AIDS, TB and Malaria and the Bill and Melinda Gates Foundation.
