= Peter Chernin =

American businessman and investor

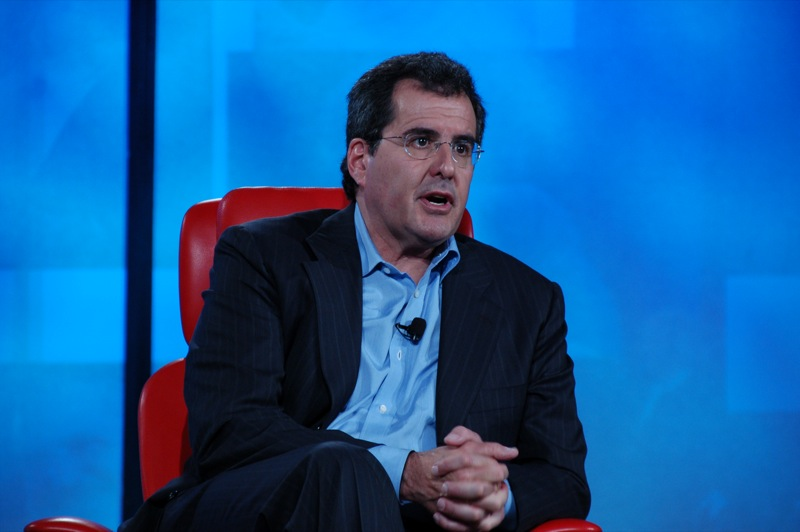
- Chernin in 2007
- Born: May 29, 1951 (age 75); Harrison, New York, U.S.
- Education: University of California, Berkeley
- Occupations: Chairman and CEO, The Chernin Group (TCG)
- Spouse: Megan Brody (m. 1980)
- Children: 3

Peter Chernin (born May 29, 1951) is an American film and television producer, businessman, and investor. He is the chairman and CEO of the Chernin Group (TCG), which he founded in 2010. TCG manages, operates, and invests in businesses in the media, entertainment, and technology sectors.

== Early life and education ==
Chernin was born in Harrison, New York, the son of Mary (née Townsend) and Herbert Chernin. Chernin, whose father was Jewish, was raised Unitarian.

He attended and graduated with a B.A. in English literature from the University of California, Berkeley.

== Career ==
Chernin joined Fox in 1989 from Lorimar Film Entertainment, where he was president and chief operating officer. Earlier, he was executive vice president of programming and marketing for Showtime/The Movie Channel. Prior to Showtime, Chernin was vice president of Development and Production at the David Gerber Company. He began his career in publishing, first as associate publicity director of St. Martin's Press and later as an editor for Warner Books.

=== News Corp. ===
Prior to starting TCG, Chernin was president and chief operating officer of News Corporation and chairman and CEO of the Fox Group from 1996 to 2009. As president and COO of one of the world's largest media companies, he oversaw diversified global operations spanning five continents, including the production and distribution of film and television programming; television, satellite, and cable broadcasting; and News Corp.'s aggressive expansion into the digital media and internet space.

During his two decades with News Corporation, Chernin gained a reputation as an executive with a unique mastery of both the creative and corporate sides of the entertainment business. He headed both Twentieth Century Fox Filmed Entertainment and, earlier, the Fox Broadcasting Company. He has also had oversight of Fox's tremendous growth in sports, cable and general entertainment television programming and distribution in the U.S. and internationally.

Under Chernin's leadership, Twentieth Century Fox Film Corporation produced the two top-grossing movies of all time, Titanic and Avatar; the Fox Broadcasting Company became the No. 1-ranked network among the key demographic of 18- to 49-year-olds; and Twentieth Century Fox Television, the network production arm of Fox, became the No. 1 supplier of programming to all television networks.

News Corporation's cable network group experienced explosive growth during Chernin's tenure – going from zero to more than 400 million cable subscribers in less than 10 years. By the time Chernin left, Fox had one of the most powerful collections of cable assets in the world: Fox News Channel, FX, Fox Sports Net, Fox Movie Channel, National Geographic Television, SPEED and the Fox Reality Channel. Prior to his 1996 appointment, Chernin was four years as chairman and chief executive officer of Fox Filmed Entertainment where he oversaw all aspects of the studio's worldwide feature-film production, marketing and distribution activities. From 1989 to 1992, Chernin was president of entertainment for the Fox Broadcasting Company, while programming grew from two to all seven nights of the week during that span.

It was rumored in the media that Chernin was going to leave his position at News Corp. by June 2009, when his contract expired, and that he would be replaced in the position by media executive James Murdoch, the youngest son of Rupert Murdoch. On February 24, 2009, the Wall Street Journal reported that Peter Chernin made the decision to leave News Corporation after 20 years to pursue independent entrepreneurial ventures. On June 4, 2009, Chase Carey was named Chernin's successor in his position.

Chernin was approached in October 2010 by the Tribune Company to be either CEO or chairman of the board. There was also media speculation about Chernin's having a role in Yahoo!'s future after Carol Bartz's abrupt departure in September 2011. At the All Things Digital's AsiaD Conference in Hong Kong on October 20, 2011, Chernin dismissed that he was interested in pursuing opportunities with the company.

=== TCG ===
Since his departure from News Corp. in 2009, Chernin has been the chairman of his own company, The Chernin Group (TCG). TCG's current assets include Chernin Entertainment, an entertainment production company; a majority stake in CA Media, an Asia-based media investment company; and several strategic investments in U.S. based technology and media companies including Pandora, Fullscreen, Tumblr, Barstool Sports, and Flipboard.

The company's first feature film Rise of the Planet of the Apes, was released in August 2011. and has grossed more than $480 million at the worldwide box office. Chernin Entertainment produced Parental Guidance, a comedy starring Billy Crystal and Bette Midler, which was released in December 2012, the sci-fi thriller from Joseph Kosinski, Oblivion, starring Tom Cruise, and The Heat, starring Melissa McCarthy and Sandra Bullock.

TCG launched CA Media in November 2010, which aims to strategically build, manage, and operate media, entertainment, and technology businesses in Asia. In July 2011, CA Media invested in the Hong Kong-based mixed martial arts promoter Legend Fighting Championship. In April 2012, CA Media acquired a 49 percent stake in Endemol India with the goal of making it the leading TV, film and digital content production company in India. At the same time, CA Media also invested in Only Much Louder, a music, live events, and youth media company in India. In April 2014, AT&T partnered with The Chernin Group to invest $500 million in online video services.

In April 2012, Chernin sold a minority stake of TCG to strategic investment partners Providence Equity Partners, a leading private equity firm, and other private investors.

In April 2013, Chernin made a bid of around $500 million for Hulu, an online video streaming service. TCG is listed as an investor in Tumblr, which WSJ.com reported on May 19, 2013, would be sold to Yahoo for US$1.1 billion. On December 2, 2013, TCG announced that they had acquired the anime streaming site Crunchyroll in an effort to expand their online video assets. The acquisition was rumored to be priced at around $100 million. On January 7, 2016, it was announced by Dave Portnoy in a video that Chernin Media was acquiring a majority stake in the popular website Barstool Sports and moving the headquarters to New York City.

In 2018, Chernin, Jesse Jacobs, and Michael Kerns of The Chernin Group formed TCG Capital Management, an investment advisory firm. TCG manages private equity investments in the media, entertainment, technology, sports, and consumer sectors. That same year, Chernin divested its interest of Crunchyroll to AT&T and folded it into the WarnerMedia division. Crunchyroll was subsequently sold to Funimation in 2021.

In July 2022, Peter Chernin established his global independent production company, The North Road Company, and his production company Chernin Entertainment became part of it.

In January 2023, Variety reported that Peter Chernin's global production studio roll-up company The North Road Co. had received a $150 million investment from Qatar Investment Authority, in addition to an existing $500 million from Providence Equity and $300 million from Apollo Global Management to enable investment in media and technology companies and pursuit of strategic acquisitions.

In February 2023, Reuters reported that Chernin was linked to interest in ITV Studios, the maker of the hit show "Love Island".

In July 2023, Chernin's investment vehicle, The North Road Company, expressed an interest in the acquisition of All3Media, the UK production company that produces Fleabag, Gogglebox and The Traitors.

=== Boards ===
Chernin sits on the boards of American Express, is a co-chair of University of California, Berkeley's board of visitors, and is a senior advisor to Providence Equity Partners. He is also chairman and co-founder of Malaria No More and a trustee of Malaria No More UK, non-profits dedicated to ending deaths due to malaria. He previously was on the boards of Twitter, Pandora, News Corp, DirecTV, E-Trade, and Friends of the Global Fight Against AIDS, Tuberculosis and Malaria.

== Personal life ==
Chernin married Megan (née Brody) in 1980.

== Political views ==
Chernin has donated over $100,000 to the Democratic Party, candidates & associated organizations, as well as hosting Barack Obama at his home for a fundraiser in 2013. He also supported Hillary Clinton in the run-up to the 2016 U.S. presidential election.

== Filmography ==
He was a producer in all films unless otherwise noted.

=== Film ===
| Year | Film | Co-Producer(s) | Distributor | Budget | Gross |
|---|---|---|---|---|---|
| 2011 | Rise of the Planet of the Apes | Dylan Clark, Rick Jaffa and Amanda Silver | 20th Century Fox | $93 million | $481.8 million |
| 2012 | Parental Guidance | Dylan Clark and Billy Crystal | 20th Century Fox | $25 million | $119.8 million |
| 2013 | Oblivion | Dylan Clark, Duncan Henderson, Joseph Kosinski and Barry Levine | Universal Pictures | $120 million | $287.9 million |
| 2013 | The Heat | Jenno Topping | 20th Century Fox | $43 million | $229.9 million |
| 2014 | Dawn of the Planet of the Apes | Dylan Clark, Rick Jaffa and Amanda Silver | 20th Century Fox | $170 million | $710.6 million |
| 2014 | The Drop | Dylan Clark and Mike Larocca | Fox Searchlight Pictures | $12.6 million | $18.7 million |
| 2014 | St. Vincent | Jenno Topping, Fred Roos and Theodore Melfi | The Weinstein Company | $13 million | $54.8 million |
| 2014 | Exodus: Gods and Kings | Jenno Topping, Ridley Scott, Michael Schaefer and Mark Huffam | 20th Century Fox | $140 million | $268.2 million |
| 2015 | Spy | Jenno Topping, Paul Feig and Jessie Henderson | 20th Century Fox | $65 million | $235.7 million |
| 2016 | Mike and Dave Need Wedding Dates | Jenno Topping and Jonathan Levine | 20th Century Fox | $33 million | $77.1 million |
| 2016 | Miss Peregrine's Home for Peculiar Children | Jenno Topping | 20th Century Fox | $110 million | $296.5 million |
| 2016 | Hidden Figures | Jenno Topping, Theodore Melfi, Donna Gigliotti and Pharrell Williams | 20th Century Fox | $25 million | $236.2 million |
| 2017 | Snatched | Jenno Topping, Paul Feig and Jessie Henderson | 20th Century Fox | $42 million | $60.8 million |
| 2017 | War for the Planet of the Apes | Dylan Clark, Rick Jaffa and Amanda Silver | 20th Century Fox | $150 million | $490.7 million |
| 2017 | The Mountain Between Us | Dylan Clark, Jenno Topping and David Ready | 20th Century Fox | $35 million | $62.8 million |
| 2017 | The Greatest Showman | Jenno Topping and Laurence Mark | 20th Century Fox | $84 million | $435 million |
| 2018 | Red Sparrow | Jenno Topping, David Ready and Steven Zaillian | 20th Century Fox | $69 million | $151.6 million |
| 2019 | Tolkien | Jenno Topping, David Ready and Kris Thykier | Fox Searchlight Pictures | $20 million | $9 million |
| 2019 | Ford v Ferrari | Jenno Topping and James Mangold | 20th Century Fox | $97.6 million | $225.5 million |
| 2019 | Spies in Disguise | Jenno Topping and Michael J. Travers | 20th Century Fox | $100 million | $171 million |
| 2020 | Underwater | Jenno Topping and Tonia Davis | 20th Century Fox | $50 million | $40 million |
| 2021 | Fear Street Part One: 1994 | Jenno Topping and David Ready | Netflix | —N/a | |
| 2021 | Fear Street Part Two: 1978 | Jenno Topping and David Ready | Netflix | —N/a | |
| 2021 | Fear Street Part Three: 1666 | Jenno Topping and David Ready | Netflix | —N/a | |
| 2022 | Slumberland | Jenno Topping, David Ready, Francis Lawrence and Cameron MacConomy | Netflix | $150 million | —N/a |
| 2023 | Dicks: The Musical | Jenno Topping, Larry Charles, Kori Adelson | A24 | | |
| 2025 | Back in Action | Seth Gordon, Beau Bauman, Jenno Topping | Netflix | | |
| 2025 | Fear Street: Prom Queen | Peter Chernin, Jenno Topping and Kori Adelson | Netflix | | |
| 2026 | Apex | Ian Bryce, Jenno Topping, David Ready, Charlize Theron, Dawn Olmstead, Beth Kono, AJ Dix, Baltasar Kormákur | Netflix | | |
| 2026 | Backrooms | James Wan, Michael Clear, Roberto Patino, Shawn Levy, Dan Cohen, Dan Levine, Osgood Perkins, Chris Ferguson, Peter Chernin, Jenno Topping, Kori Adelson | A24 | | |
| 2026 | The Last House | Peter Chernin, Jenno Topping, Kori Adelson and Oly Obst | Netflix | | |
| TBA | Luther 3 | Peter Chernin, Neil Cross, Idris Elba, Gina Carter and Tim Lewis | Netflix | | |

Thanks

| Year | Film | Role |
|---|---|---|
| 2015 | Lazer Team | The producers wish to thank |

=== Television ===
| Year | Title | Credit | Notes |
|---|---|---|---|
| 2010 | Seek and Destroy | Executive producer | Television pilot |
| 2010 | Pleading Guilty | Executive producer | Television pilot |
| 2011 | Allen Gregory | Executive producer | |
| 2011 | Terra Nova | Executive producer | |
| 2011 | Outnumbered | Executive producer | Television special |
| 2011 | Metro | Executive producer | Television film |
| 2011 | Lovelives | Executive producer | Television pilot |
| 2011−12 | Breakout Kings | Executive producer | |
| 2012 | Entry Level | Executive producer | Television pilot |
| 2012−13 | Ben and Kate | Executive producer | |
| 2012−13 | Touch | Executive producer | |
| 2013 | Two Wrongs | Executive producer | Television pilot |
| 2014 | Delirium | Executive producer | Television pilot |
| 2014 | Hieroglyph | Executive producer | |
| 2016 | Me & Mean Margaret | Executive producer | Television pilot |
| 2011−18 | New Girl | Executive producer | |
| 2019−2022 | See | Executive producer | |
| 2019−2023 | Truth Be Told | Executive producer | |
| 2020−present | P-Valley | Executive producer | |
| 2021 | Bombay Begums | Executive producer | |
| 2024 | Exploding Kittens | Executive producer | |

Miscellaneous crew

| Year | Title | Role | Notes |
|---|---|---|---|
| 1982 | Cry for the Strangers | Production executive | Television film |
| 1982−83 | Seven Brides for Seven Brothers | Executive consultant | |

As an actor

| Year | Title | Role |
|---|---|---|
| 2009 | Family Guy | Himself |

Production manager

| Year | Title | Role | Notes |
|---|---|---|---|
| 1981 | Elvis and the Beauty Queen | Production executive | Television film |
