= Mwasiti =

Mwasiti Almas Nyangasa
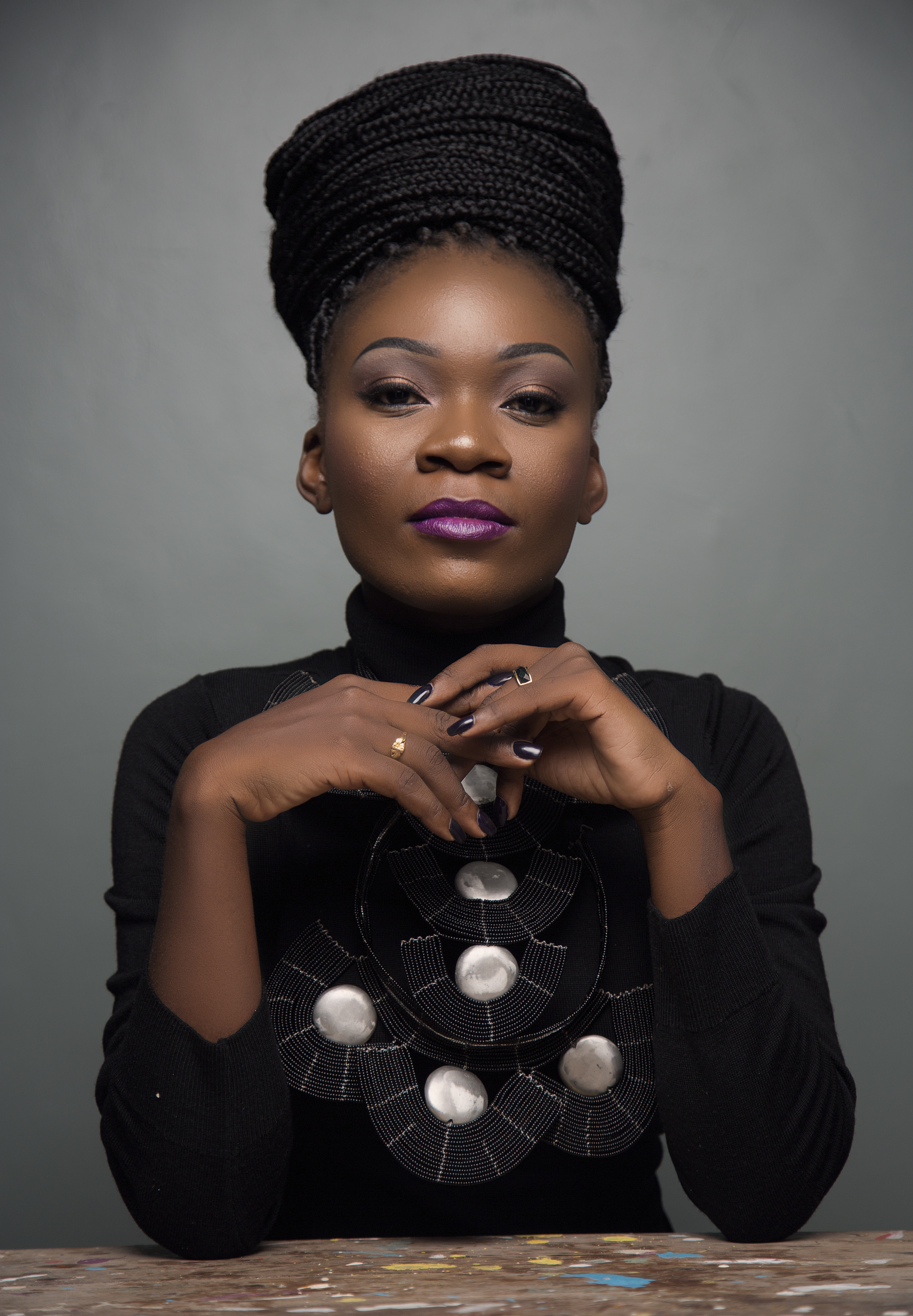

Background information
- Also known as: Almas; Chitty witty
- Born: Mwasiti Almas Nyangasa; February 2, 1986 (age 39); Dar es salaam, Tanzania
- Genres: Afro pop; bongo flava; zouk
- Occupations: Singer; songwriter
- Years active: 2006–present
- Labels: GMF music group

Mwasiti Almas Yusuph (born February 2, 1986) popularly known as Mwasiti, is a singer and songwriter of Afropop, Zouk and Bongo Flava music from Tanzania. She is best known for her single "Nalivua Pendo," which was number one on the Tanzania radio charts for eight consecutive weeks and won "Best Zouk Song" at the 2009 Tanzania Music Awards.

== Early life and career ==
Mwasiti started her music career in 2006 after joining Tanzania House of Talent. She released her first single titled Nambie in 2006, which was nominated twice at the Tanzania Music Awards as Best newcomer artist and nominated for Best zouk song. In 2014 she performed in New York City at the Malaria No More Benefit Concert, organized by Malaria No More.

In year 2006, she was nominated ‘Best Upcoming Female Artist’ at the Tanzania Music awards. Her single "Nalivua Pendo" holds the record for staying number one on the radio charts for eight consecutive weeks, and stayed on the charts for the next 30 weeks. It then won "Best Zouk Song" at the 2009 Tanzania Music Awards. At the 2013 Tanzania Music Awards, Mwasiti become the first female artist to receive five nominations. She has said her songs have been inspired by aspects of her own life. She believes it's important for Tanzanian artists to remember their roots. She is a civil rights activist for causes such as malaria and helping refugees.

== Discography ==
=== Albums ===
Album title	Album details
Kamili	Released: January 1, 2012; Label: Mwasiti; Formats: Digital download, CD

=== Singles ===
- Nambie (2006)
- Hao (featuring Chidi Benz) (2007)
- Nalivua pendo (2008)
- Sio kisa pombe (2009)
- Serebuka (2010)
- Sema nae (2012)
- Unaniangalia (2013)
- Kaa nao (2016)
- Mapenzi ugonjwa (2017)

== Awards and nominations ==
Year	Award Ceremony	Prize	Work/Recipient	Result
2007	Tanzania Music Awards	Best upcoming artist of year	Mwasiti	Won
2009	Tanzania Music Awards	Best Zouk song	"Nalivua pendo" by Mwasiti	Won
2010	Tanzania Music Awards	Best Female Singer	Mwasiti	Nominated
2011	Tanzania Music Awards	Best Female Singer	Mwasiti	Nominated
2011	Tanzania Music Awards	Best Female artist	Mwasiti	Nominated
2013	Tanzania Music Awards	Best Female Singer	Mwasiti	Nominated
2013	Tanzania Music Awards	Best Female artist	Mwasiti	Nominated
2013	Tanzania Music Awards	Song of the Year	Mapito (featuring Ally Nipishe)	Nominated
2013	Tanzania Music Awards	Best Featured Song	Mapito (featuring Ally Nipishe)	Nominated
2013	Tanzania Music Awards	Best Song Zouk/Rhumba	Mapito (featuring Ally Nipishe)	Nominated
