= Tolkien (film) =

2019 film by Dome Karukoski

- Theatrical release poster
- Directed by: Dome Karukoski
- Written by: David Gleeson; Stephen Beresford
- Produced by: Peter Chernin; Jenno Topping; David Ready; Kris Thykier
- Starring: Nicholas Hoult; Lily Collins; Colm Meaney; Derek Jacobi
- Cinematography: Lasse Frank
- Edited by: Harri Ylönen
- Music by: Thomas Newman
- Production company: Chernin Entertainment
- Distributed by: Fox Searchlight Pictures
- Release dates: 3 May 2019 (United Kingdom); 10 May 2019 (United States)
- Running time: 112 minutes
- Countries: United Kingdom; United States
- Language: English
- Budget: $20 million
- Box office: $9 million

Tolkien is a 2019 biographical drama film directed by Dome Karukoski and written by David Gleeson and Stephen Beresford. It is about the early life of English professor and philologist J. R. R. Tolkien, author of The Hobbit (1937), The Lord of the Rings (1954–55), and The Silmarillion (1977) as well as notable academic works. The film stars Nicholas Hoult, Lily Collins, Colm Meaney, and Derek Jacobi.

Tolkien was released in the United Kingdom on 3 May 2019, and in the United States on 10 May 2019, by Fox Searchlight Pictures, and was the first feature film released after the acquisition of 21st Century Fox by Disney. The film received mixed reviews from critics and grossed $9 million worldwide on a $20 million budget.

== Plot ==
As young children being raised by a widowed mother, John Ronald Reuel Tolkien and his brother Hilary receive help from a local priest, Father Francis, who must relocate them from their home to small apartments in Birmingham due to financial hardships. Their mother is supportive and loving, filling their minds with stories of adventure and mystery which she recites by the fireplace at night. She becomes ill, however, and one day upon returning home from school, Tolkien finds her slumped in her chair, dead.

Father Francis becomes the boys' legal guardian, and eventually finds a kindly rich woman who agrees to take them in, providing them with room and board while they continue their childhood education. There, Tolkien meets Edith Bratt, the woman's only other ward. Tolkien is taken with Edith, whose piano playing he admires, and the two become friends.

At school, Tolkien immediately shows talent with languages, earning rough treatment from a rival classmate, Robert Gilson. When the two boys get into a fight, the headmaster – Robert's father – orders that they spend all of their time together for the remainder of the term. While both initially resent the assignment, Tolkien is soon accepted into Robert's small circle of friends, and the four – Tolkien, Gilson, Christopher Wiseman, and Geoffrey Smith – form a close friendship, the TCBS or "Tea Club and Barrovian Society", which grows with the years, even as they attend separate universities. Meanwhile, Tolkien continues his friendship with Edith, falling in love with her. Father Francis finds out about their relationship and recognizes that it is affecting Tolkien's grades, and so forbids him from pursuing her while under his guardianship. Tolkien is distraught, not wanting to lose the priest's financial support of his schooling. He relates the conversation to Edith, promising they will be able to be together when he reaches 21, the age of majority, but she instead ends the relationship. One night, Tolkien wakes his whole college, Exeter College, part of the University of Oxford, in the middle of the night when, drunk, he walks out onto the lawn, yelling in one of the many languages he invented. Several dons yell at him from the windows until Tolkien collapses into Smith's arms, sobbing, and tells Smith that Edith wrote to him, telling him that she is engaged.

Tolkien struggles at Oxford but attracts the attention of Professor Joseph Wright, a prominent philologist. Tolkien realises that language is his true passion and enrolls in Wright's class. When the First World War breaks out, he and his friends all enlist in the armed forces. Before Tolkien leaves, he finds Edith in the crowd, and Edith realises that she still loves him. She decides to break off her engagement with the other man, and the two declare their love for each other, sharing a kiss before Tolkien leaves. At the Battle of the Somme, suffering from trench fever, Tolkien goes to look for Smith, convinced that he is calling him, but is unable to find him and collapses unconscious. He wakes in a hospital weeks later with Edith by his side, to find that Smith and Gilson have been killed; Wiseman survived but is left traumatised and unable to speak.

Years later, Tolkien and Edith are married with four children. Now a professor at Oxford himself, Tolkien decides to try his hand at writing a children's adventure book. The film ends with him inspired to write the legendary opening line of The Hobbit: "In a hole in the ground, there lived a hobbit."

== Cast ==
- Nicholas Hoult as J. R. R. Tolkien
  - Harry Gilby as young J. R. R. Tolkien
- Lily Collins as Edith Bratt, the lifelong love and later wife of Tolkien, who served as inspiration for the characters Lúthien Tinúviel and Arwen Undómiel
  - Mimi Keene as young Edith Bratt
- Colm Meaney as Father Francis Xavier Morgan, a Roman Catholic priest and former protege of Cardinal John Henry Newman, who served as Tolkien's guardian and father figure
- Derek Jacobi as Joseph Wright, Professor of Comparative Philology at the University of Oxford
- Anthony Boyle as Geoffrey Bache Smith., an aspiring poet, and the closest of Tolkien's friends
  - Adam Bregman as young Geoffrey Smith
- Patrick Gibson as Robert Q. Gilson, an outgoing and charismatic classmate of Tolkien's
  - Albie Marber as young Robert Q. Gilson
- Tom Glynn-Carney as Christopher Wiseman, an aspiring composer
  - Ty Tennant as young Christopher Wiseman
- Craig Roberts as Private Sam Hodges, an enlisted man who serves as Tolkien's batman during the Battle of the Somme, which threatens to tear the "fellowship" apart.
- Pam Ferris as Mrs. Faulkner
- James MacCallum as Hilary Tolkien, his younger brother
  - Guillermo Bedward as young Hilary Tolkien
- Laura Donnelly as Mabel Tolkien, his mother
- Genevieve O'Reilly as Mrs. Smith
- Owen Teale as Headmaster Gilson

== Production ==
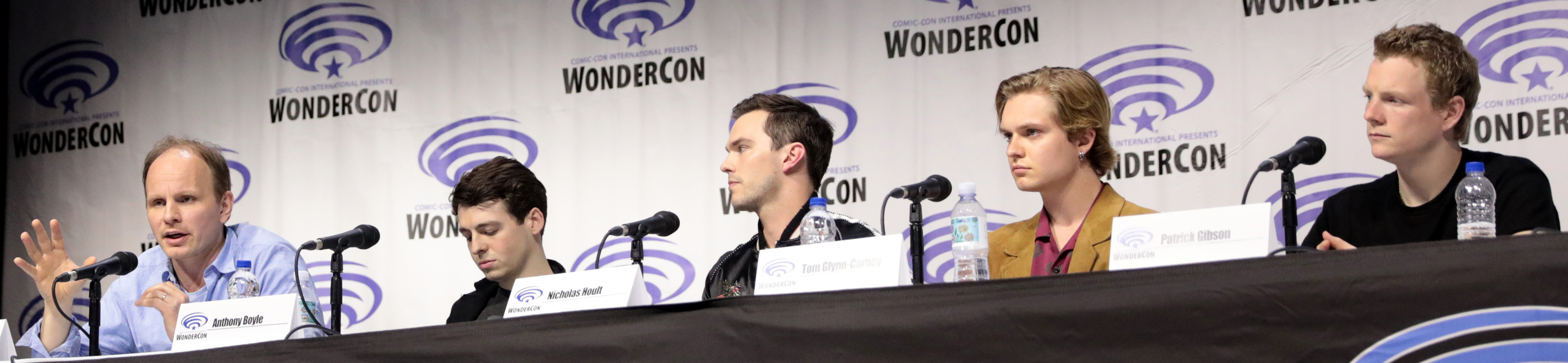
(Left to right) Director Dome Karukoski and the actors playing the four friends referred to as TCBS: Anthony Boyle (Smith), Nicholas Hoult (Tolkien), Tom Glynn-Carney (Wiseman), and Patrick Gibson (Gilson) at the 2019 WonderCon

On 21 November 2013, Fox Searchlight Pictures and Chernin Entertainment announced they were developing a biographical film about the English philologist and author of The Hobbit and The Lord of the Rings, J. R. R. Tolkien, based on a screenplay by David Gleeson. The film was to touch on many themes in Tolkien's early life, including his friendships, love of languages, religion, and romance with Edith Bratt. Another biopic, Tolkien and Lewis – about Tolkien and his friend C. S. Lewis – had been reported to be in production the previous year, but did not proceed. James Strong was announced to be directing the project, then titled Middle Earth, but later dropped out for unknown reasons. On 24 July 2017, Dome Karukoski was hired to direct the film with the screenplay from Gleeson and Stephen Beresford, which Chernin produced for Fox Searchlight to distribute.

Karukoski related that he had grown up fatherless and in poverty, and that because of this, he felt, as a child, a strong connection to Tolkien, who had similar experiences. Karukoski also mentioned that he had wanted to create a biopic about Tolkien since he was 12, which was when he first read Tolkien's works, and that it had been a dream of his to create film adaptations of The Lord of the Rings. He described the effect of Tolkien's works on him as "life-changing", saying that when he was bullied as a child, "it was like the characters became friends of mine." Of the author, he said: "[w]hat struck me the most is that he lived an amazing life... this beautiful, emotional story about love and friendship. So many things about what I had read about [in] the books, occurred or were instrumental in his own life. [The Tolkien film was] a film that had to be made."

In July 2017, Nicholas Hoult was recruited as the frontrunner for the title role. On 30 August 2017, Lily Collins was cast to co-star with Hoult, as Edith Bratt, love and later wife of Tolkien; Bratt was also the inspiration for Lúthien in The Silmarillion. Colm Meaney, Tom Glynn-Carney, and Genevieve O'Reilly joined the cast in October 2017, and Craig Roberts was added the following month. Principal photography commenced in October 2017 in the United Kingdom, and concluded on 14 December 2017.

Locations for the film included Thornton Hough village green and Ellesmere Port docks.

On 23 April 2019, the Tolkien Estate issued a statement making it clear that the family and estate did not endorse the film or its content.

== Release ==
The film was released on 3 May 2019, in the United Kingdom and on 10 May 2019 in the United States.

=== Box office ===
Tolkien has grossed $4.5 million in the United States, and $4.4 million in other territories, for a worldwide total of $9 million. In the United States and Canada, the film was released alongside Pokémon Detective Pikachu, Poms and The Hustle, and was projected to gross $2–4 million from 1,425 theaters in its opening weekend. It ended up debuting to $2.2 million and finishing in ninth.

=== Critical response ===
On the review aggregator Rotten Tomatoes, the film holds an approval rating of 51%, based on 198 reviews, and an average rating of 5.8/10. The website's critical consensus reads, "Tolkien has the period trappings and strong performances of a worthy biopic, but lacks the imagination required to truly do its subject justice." On Metacritic, the film has a weighted average score of 48 out of 100, based on 37 critics, indicating "mixed or average reviews". Audiences polled by CinemaScore gave the film an average grade of "A−" on an A+ to F scale, while those at PostTrak gave it a 76% positive score.

Giving the film two out of five stars, Wendy Ide for The Observer commented "[a] decades-long trudge through Middle-earth would seem like a carefree skip through the park compared to this slog of a literary biopic." David Sims, writing for The Atlantic, criticized the biopic as lacking imagination and subtlety, stating, "The result doesn't rise above the insight of a Wikipedia page." Sheila O'Malley, reviewing the film for Roger Ebert.com, comments that having Tolkien literally "see[ing] dragons and what would eventually become the Eye of Sauron and the Nazgûl, unfurling across the hellscape of No-man's-Land ... is a very reductive approach to literature". Worse, in O'Malley's view, is that by explicitly showing the Somme as "'inspiration'" (her quotation marks) for Middle-earth, the film "diminish[es] both the battle and the books".

On the other hand, Graeme Tuckett of Stuff gave the film four out of five stars and called it "A subtle, delicate biopic of The Lord of the Rings author." Writing for The Plain Dealer, Chuck Yarborough graded it an "A", calling it "a wonderful piece of art" and "a magical film worthy of the wizardry of Gandalf himself." Yarborough later rated it the 2nd best film of the year, after Rocketman.

The film was criticized for giving no indication that Tolkien's faith was a central theme in his life. Karukoski explained the decision as motivated by the difficulty of portraying something as "internal" as religion in Tolkien's life. Karukoski related that he had attempted to create scenes that depicted Tolkien's more religious side, but those scenes failed to engage initial audiences and were cut from the film. Nevertheless, Karukoski explained that although there are no overt references to religion in the film, religion is still implied: "We have scenes where he attends communion and helps Father Francis to show that he was a man of faith. There are also layered scenes, where he looks up to the heavens for an answer as if asking God for help. There's another scene where a figure is on a cross. Many people won't notice those hints because they're so eternal." Other reviews stated that Tolkien's Christian faith is embedded in the film as it is in his Middle-earth writings.
