= Snatched (2017 film) =

American comedy film by Jonathan Levine

- Theatrical release poster
- Directed by: Jonathan Levine
- Written by: Katie Dippold
- Produced by: Peter Chernin; Jenno Topping; Paul Feig; Jessie Henderson
- Starring: Amy Schumer; Goldie Hawn; Joan Cusack; Ike Barinholtz; Wanda Sykes; Christopher Meloni
- Cinematography: Florian Ballhaus
- Edited by: Melissa Bretherton; Zene Baker
- Music by: Theodore Shapiro; Chris Bacon
- Production companies: Chernin Entertainment; Feigco Entertainment
- Distributed by: 20th Century Fox
- Release dates: May 2, 2017 (New York City); May 12, 2017 (United States)
- Running time: 90 minutes
- Country: United States
- Language: English
- Budget: $42 million
- Box office: $60.8 million

Snatched is a 2017 American comedy film directed by Jonathan Levine and written by Katie Dippold. The film stars Amy Schumer and Goldie Hawn (in her first acting role since 2002) with Joan Cusack, Ike Barinholtz, Wanda Sykes, and Christopher Meloni in supporting roles, and follows a mother and daughter (Schumer and Hawn) who are abducted while on vacation in South America.

Snatched premiered in New York City on May 2, 2017, and was theatrically released on May 12, 2017, by 20th Century Fox. The film received mixed to unfavorable reviews, with criticism for its plot, humor and pacing, as well as the xenophobic depiction of South America. It was also a commercial flop, grossing $60.8 million worldwide on a $42 million budget.

At the 38th Golden Raspberry Awards, Hawn was nominated for Worst Supporting Actress for her performance.

== Plot ==
Recently fired from her job and dumped by her rock musician boyfriend, Emily Middleton is determined to enjoy a previously planned non-refundable trip to Ecuador. Learning of her relationship status from social media, her mother, Linda, tells her to come home in order to move on, where she reunites with her agoraphobic brother, Jeffrey. Initially refusing, Linda agrees to go on the trip with her daughter.

In Ecuador, after they check into the upscale hotel, Emily meets a handsome man named James at the hotel bar, and they begin a relationship. After one night of drinking and dancing with James, Emily and her mother take a sightseeing day trip with him. During their ride, a white van rams James' Jeep and the masked men abduct Emily and Linda. James escapes, but Linda suspects he was in on the kidnapping plot from the start. Emily awakens inside a cell and begins to panic, while Linda tries to calm herself by reading men's magazines. The leader, Hector Morgado, contacts Jeffrey and demands $100,000 in ransom money. Morgado then has his nephew take both women away from the kidnappers' hideout to another location. They manage to escape from their captors' car and stow away into a passing truck. As it drives away, Emily kills the leader's nephew who is chasing them by pounding his head with a shovel. The truck's driver then stops his truck and leaves them both in the middle of the jungle.

They find a phone at a nearby bar, where they call the U.S. State Department officer Morgan Russell, saying that they are in peril, and Morgan advises them to go to the US Embassy in Bogotá, Colombia. They meet a rugged-looking American named Roger Simmons. He agrees to help them find the consulate. After the three share a meal, Morgado and his men track them down. Morgado is about to kill them both as revenge for his only nephew's death, but Linda distracts him while Emily retrieves a nearby spear gun with which to threaten him. As she retrieves it, she accidentally fires it, killing Morgado's only son. They manage to escape with Simmons onto a boat. Soon, however, they are forced off the boat when the captain detects another boat nearby that is looking for the two women.

Meanwhile, Jeffrey, learning that his mother and sister have been kidnapped, calls Morgan at the State Department, saying he will join forces with the agents in order to find his mother and sister. Morgan reluctantly agrees. In Colombia, Emily, Linda, and Simmons hike through the jungle until Simmons falls to his death from a cliff. Later, Emily passes out from the effects of a tapeworm infestation. After a local village doctor removes the tapeworm from her body, Morgado and his men track them down again. They spot a zip line and decide to use it to escape. Unfortunately, the zip line is good for only one person. Linda forces Emily to leave her behind and is recaptured.

Emily safely arrives at the US Consulate. Determined to find her mother, she seeks help from two feisty American women veterans, Ruth and Barb, whom Emily met at the resort in Ecuador. Ruth and Barb take her to James, who was conspiring with Morgado, in the apartment where he is being interrogated for the kidnappers' location. With the ladies' help, Emily rescues her mother at the kidnappers' apartment. They try to escape in another truck, but Morgado intercepts them. As he is about to kill Emily, Linda blows her dog whistle, summoning a dog that attacks Morgado. U.S. State Department agents arrive to arrest Morgado, and Jeffrey reunites with his mother and sister.

One year later, Emily and Linda take another trip to Kuala Lumpur, where Emily meets another man, who offers her a drink. Emily refuses, and she and Linda proceed to dance.

== Cast ==
- Amy Schumer as Emily Louise Middleton, Jeffrey's sister, Linda's daughter and Michael's girlfriend
- Goldie Hawn as Linda Middleton, Emily and Jeffrey's mother
- Ike Barinholtz as Jeffrey Middleton, Emily's agoraphobic brother and Linda's son
- Wanda Sykes as Ruth, Barb's friend and a woman Emily and Linda meet on vacation
- Joan Cusack as Barb, Ruth's friend
- Christopher Meloni as Roger Simmons
- Óscar Jaenada as Hector Morgado
- Bashir Salahuddin as Morgan Russell, an officer at the U.S. State Department
- Tom Bateman as James
- Randall Park as Michael, Emily's boyfriend who breaks up with her
- Tom Choi as the Colonel
- Raven Goodwin as Lew, Emily's boss
- Al Madrigal as Embassy Official
- Arturo Castro as Dr. Armando

== Production ==
On May 22, 2015, trade reports announced that Amy Schumer would star in an action-comedy film scripted by Katie Dippold, which was rewritten by Schumer and her sister Kim Caramele. Dippold said it was inspired by her own relationship with her mother. Paul Feig produced through Feigco Entertainment, along with Chernin Entertainment's Jessie Henderson. 20th Century Fox distributes the film worldwide. On August 18, 2015, Jonathan Levine was reported to be in talks to direct the film.

By February 2016, Goldie Hawn was in talks to play Schumer's mother, in her first film role since 2002's The Banger Sisters. In May 2016, Christopher Meloni, Ike Barinholtz, Óscar Jaenada and Wanda Sykes were added to the cast. By May, the film had the working title Mother/Daughter.

The film began principal photography in Hawaii on May 30, 2016. Filming wrapped on September 1, 2016, and also took place in Puerto Rico. On December 12, 2016, Schumer announced that the movie would be titled Snatched.

== Reception ==
=== Box office ===
Snatched grossed $45.9 million in the United States and Canada and $15 million in other territories, for a worldwide total of $60.8 million, against a production budget of $42 million.

In North America, Snatched was released on May 12, 2017, alongside King Arthur: Legend of the Sword and Lowriders and was projected to gross $15 million to $20 million during its opening weekend. It made $675,000 from Thursday night previews at about 2,625 theaters, before expanding to 3,501 theaters for the weekend and made $5 million on its first day (including previews). It went on to debut to $19.5 million, finishing second at the box office, behind Guardians of the Galaxy Vol. 2. It dropped 60% in its second weekend with $7.8 million, finishing fourth.

=== Critical response ===
On Rotten Tomatoes, the film has an approval rating of 36% based on 213 reviews, with an average rating of 5.10/10. The website's critical consensus reads, "Snatched has a pair of terrifically talented stars, but their presence isn't enough to compensate for this rote comedy's threadbare plot and scattershot laughs." On Metacritic, the film has a score of 45 out of 100, based 41 critics, indicating "mixed or average reviews". Audiences polled by CinemaScore gave the film an average grade of "B" on an A+ to F scale.

Richard Roeper of the Chicago Sun-Times wrote: "The tantalizing enticement of Goldie Hawn pairing with Amy Schumer for a mother-daughter, road-trip buddy comedy has some moments, but never fulfills its promise. As their onscreen adventures and antics grow zanier and broader, the laughs actually grow softer and more sporadic."

=== Home media ===
Snatched was released on DVD and Blu-ray August 8, 2017.
