= Underwater (film) =

2020 film directed by William Eubank

- Theatrical release poster
- Directed by: William Eubank
- Screenplay by: Brian Duffield; Adam Cozad
- Story by: Brian Duffield
- Produced by: Peter Chernin; Tonia Davis; Jenno Topping
- Starring: Kristen Stewart; Vincent Cassel; Jessica Henwick; John Gallagher Jr.; Mamoudou Athie; T.J. Miller
- Cinematography: Bojan Bazelli
- Edited by: Todd E. Miller; Brian Berdan; William Hoy
- Music by: Marco Beltrami; Brandon Roberts
- Production companies: 20th Century Fox; Chernin Entertainment
- Distributed by: 20th Century Fox
- Release date: January 10, 2020
- Running time: 95 minutes
- Country: United States
- Language: English
- Budget: $50–65 million
- Box office: $40.9 million

Underwater is a 2020 American science fiction action horror film directed by William Eubank. The film stars Kristen Stewart, Vincent Cassel, Jessica Henwick, John Gallagher Jr., Mamoudou Athie, and T.J. Miller. It follows a group of workers at a drilling facility at the bottom of the ocean who encounter hostile creatures after an earthquake destroys the facility.

Underwater was released in the United States on January 10, 2020, by 20th Century Fox; it was the last film under the Fox name before the studio's rebranding as 20th Century Studios on January 17. (Note: Although this was the last movie marketed as 20th Century Fox, the final movie to have the logo was The Empty Man.) The film received mixed reviews from critics and was a box office disappointment, grossing $40 million worldwide against a production budget of $50–65 million.

== Plot ==
In 2050, the Kepler 822, a research and drilling facility operated by Tian Industries at the bottom of the Mariana Trench, is struck by what is assumed to be a strong earthquake. As part of the facility is destroyed by the incident, mechanical engineer Norah Price and her colleagues, Rodrigo and Paul, make their way to the escape pod bay. However, the three discover that all of the escape pods have already been deployed, with Captain Lucien being the only person in the area when the three arrive.

Together, they reach a control base and find biologist Emily Haversham and engineer Liam Smith, who are unsuccessful in their attempts to make contact with the surface. Lucien suggests using pressurized suits to walk one mile across the ocean floor to Roebuck 641 hoping to resurface from there. As they descend in a freight elevator, Rodrigo's defective helmet implodes under the water pressure, killing him. The surviving crew sees a distress beacon from one of the escape pods below, and Liam and Paul go to investigate.

As they arrive at the location, they find a body in the rubble. A creature emerges from the corpse's back and attacks them. Liam kills the creature and takes it inside. Emily examines the creature and realizes that it belongs to a previously undiscovered species. The five make their way to the sea floor, but as they are walking, the Kepler explodes above and nearly buries them in debris. Liam is hit, but Norah and Lucien save him. They manage to get through an access tunnel to an intermediate station, where they can charge and clean their suits. However, they find that Liam's oxygen scrubber is badly damaged from the debris.

On their way through the access tunnel, Paul is attacked by an unknown creature, dragged underwater, and killed. Before the team leaves the access tunnel, they find that Liam's damaged oxygen pod will cause him to suffocate from the explosion's toxic fumes. Unwilling to leave another crew member behind, Norah, Lucien, and Emily agree to help Liam walk. The four set off across the ocean floor, but a humanoid creature appears and drags Liam into a cave. Lucien manages to get Liam out, but he is pulled from the other three. Norah is dragged along with Lucien, but Lucien sacrifices himself to spare Norah from the increasing pressure differential.

Norah ends up at the abandoned Shepard station alone and is able to change her damaged diving suit before continuing toward Roebuck. Walking along the ocean floor, she reunites with Emily and Liam and proceeds to help drag the latter. As they near Roebuck, they encounter a nest of humanoid creatures hanging near the entrance and try to sneak by, but the sound of Emily's oxygen alarm wakes the creatures. Norah is partially swallowed by one of the creatures but is able to kill it and free herself.

The three manage to reach the escape pod bay, but Norah discovers that only two of the pods are functional. Norah and Emily manage to get the ailing Liam into a pod, and Norah persuades Emily to take the last one. As this happens, a Cthulhu-like gigantic creature emerges and attacks the Roebuck, while the smaller creatures follow the two escape pods. Norah, accepting her impending death, initiates an overload of Roebuck's nuclear core, resulting in a massive explosion that kills the creatures and allows the escape pods to reach the surface. During the credits, news headlines say there were only two survivors, and Tian Industries refuses to be involved with investigations into the events due to expanding its drilling efforts.

== Cast ==
- Kristen Stewart as Norah Price – the mechanical engineer of the Kepler 822
- Vincent Cassel as Captain Lucien – the captain of the Kepler 822
- Jessica Henwick as Emily Haversham – the biologist of the Kepler 822
- John Gallagher Jr. as Liam Smith – the engineer of the Kepler 822
- Mamoudou Athie as Rodrigo Nagenda – one of Norah's crewmates on the Kepler 822 and the first survivor Norah finds
- T.J. Miller as Paul Abel – one of Norah's crewmates who survived the initial cave in

== Production ==
=== Development and casting ===
On February 22, 2017, it was announced that Kristen Stewart would star in Underwater, a film to be directed by William Eubank from a screenplay by Brian Duffield and Adam Cozad. It was revealed that principal production would commence the next month. On March 7, 2017, T.J. Miller and Jessica Henwick joined the cast, and principal production was set to commence later that month in New Orleans.

On April 5, 2017, during principal production, Vincent Cassel and Mamoudou Athie joined the cast, and the next day, John Gallagher Jr. was also added. In May 2017, following the end of filming for the film, it was revealed that Gunner Wright was also part of the cast. After shooting the film, the director decided to design the alpha creature based on H. P. Lovecraft's mythos, as it features Cthulhu as the monster.

=== Music ===
Marco Beltrami and Brandon Roberts composed the film score. Fox Music and Hollywood Records released the soundtrack.

=== Alternate ending ===
In an alternate ending, after overloading the core, Norah makes her way to the damaged escape pod and rewires it, escaping just before the Roebuck explodes. This ending was not featured in the theatrical release of the film.

== Release ==
Underwater was released in the United States on January 10, 2020 and in UK cinemas on February 7, 2020.

== Reception ==
=== Box office ===
Underwater grossed $17.3 million in the United States and Canada and $23.7 million in other territories, for a worldwide total of $41 million.

In the United States and Canada, Underwater was released alongside Like a Boss and the expansions of Just Mercy and 1917, and was projected to gross around $8 million in its opening weekend. The film made $2.7 million on its first day, including $500,000 from Thursday night previews. It went on to debut at $7 million, finishing seventh at the box office. The film fell 48% in its second weekend to $3.6 million (and $4.8 million over the four-day Martin Luther King Jr. Day holiday), finishing eleventh.

=== Critical response ===
On review aggregator website Rotten Tomatoes, the film has an approval rating of 49% based on 222 reviews, with an average rating of 5.30/10. The site's critical consensus reads, "Underwater's strong cast and stylish direction aren't enough to distract from the strong sense of déjà vu provoked by this claustrophobic thriller's derivative story." On Metacritic, the film has a weighted average score of 48 out of 100 based on 37 critics, indicating "mixed or average reviews." Audiences polled by CinemaScore gave the film an average grade of "C" on an A+ to F scale, and PostTrak reported it received an average 2 out of 5 stars, with 35% of people saying they would definitely recommend it.

John DeFore of The Hollywood Reporter wrote: "This is a creature feature, whose gory jump-scares and icktastic critter design are the reason you're here. An ensemble led by Kristen Stewart brings credible camaraderie to the scenario without quite matching the vivid chemistry of Alien and its best descendants; with such a tightly packed survival tale ahead of them, though, few viewers will be calling out for more character development."

Owen Gleiberman of Variety wrote: "Underwater is a stupefying entertainment in which every claustrophobic space and apocalyptic crash of water registers as a slick visual trigger, yet it's all built on top of a dramatic void. It's boredom in Sensurround."

=== Accolades ===
| Award | Date of ceremony | Category | Recipient(s) | Result | Ref. |
|---|---|---|---|---|---|
| Visual Effects Society Awards | April 6, 2021 | Outstanding Compositing in a Photoreal Feature | Sreejith Venugopalan, Ruslan Borysov, Susil Sabat, Andreas Andersson | Nominated | |

== See also ==
- Gorgo (film), a 1961 film, featuring a fictional giant mother monster, Gorgo
- List of underwater science fiction works
