= The Last House =

- Release poster
- Directed by: Louis Leterrier
- Written by: Matthew Robinson
- Produced by: Peter Chernin; Jenno Topping; Kori Adelson; Louis Leterrier; Oly Obst
- Starring: Greta Lee; Wagner Moura
- Cinematography: Pål Ulvik Rokseth
- Edited by: Adam Gough
- Music by: Yair Elazar Glotman
- Production companies: Chernin Entertainment; 3 Arts Entertainment
- Distributed by: Netflix
- Release date: August 7, 2026
- Running time: 112 minutes
- Country: United States
- Language: English

The Last House is a 2026 American science fiction horror film directed by Louis Leterrier and written by Matthew Robinson. It stars Greta Lee and Wagner Moura. The film follows a family that finds themselves inexplicably sealed in their home, with the whole world being affected by a mysterious disaster, forcing them to learn to survive.

The Last House was released on Netflix on August 7, 2026.

== Plot ==
Jason Delgado, an unemployed engineer, is fishing when he sees an unusual-looking inbound storm. Just as it starts to rain, he returns to his home in Seattle's Queen Anne neighborhood where he lives with his wife Ann, their two children Graham and Ruth, and the family dog Cassidy. When they try to leave, they discover that none of their doors or windows can open, their Internet and phones no longer work, and their neighbors are similarly trapped, while others are stranded outside. Jason tries to break through the windows, walls and floor, but the water has created a barrier that prevents exit on all sides.

The electricity still works and they have water, but after two days of no change, Jason and Ann begin rationing food, water, and electricity, even though the latter is coming from the power grid and they do not have a system to store it. They also set up activities to keep Graham and Ruth busy, which includes simple survival skill lessons.

Over the following weeks, Ann works on an indoor vegetable garden and Jason builds a water reclamation system. Ruth notices a creature outside when it rains that she believes is friendly. However, when she mentions this to her family, they initially dismiss it as her imagination.

Two months after getting trapped, one of the outsiders, their neighbor Susan, arrives at the house yelling that there is no one left before being attacked by one of the creatures. In the aftermath, Jason and Ann implement a routine to hide themselves from view when it rains, as this is when the creatures are active. When the house's chimney cap falls in, they hoist Ruth up the chimney.

Although Ruth is too big to go out, she confirms that the opening can access the outside. Cassidy becomes sick when his medicine runs out; Jason shoots him and keeps his remains in the freezer. Jason, with Graham's help, builds traps that he sends out through the opening to capture small animals that are now wandering the suburb, using Cassidy's remains and Ann's vegetables as bait. The power grid eventually collapses.

Five years later, they have expanded Ann's garden through the living room floor and their water systems are set up through the house. Despite Jason and Ann's efforts, Graham and Ruth are struggling and feel that survival is pointless. One day, a creature with tentacles and dripping seawater enters their house, and although it does not find them, it poisons their garden and water supplies. Ruth has liquid from the creature spill upon her face. Once it is gone, she wipes some off to taste it and deduces that it is salt water.

When helping with a trap, Ruth is bitten by a ferret and contracts an infection. Desperate to go outside, Jason follows the cracks in the house's floor and finds an opening, as the house is sinking and the water barrier has shifted. Ann uses the sewage pipes to obtain antibiotics from their dentist neighbor Max Richardson's house, and encounters a creature while escaping, forcing Jason to seal the opening behind her. Knowing that the creatures will come for them, the family fashion weapons and traps in the hopes of escaping.

The next time it rains, water floods the house from the pipes, forcing the family upwards to the attic. A creature enters their house to attack them and they manage to trap it. Jason stops short of killing it when Ruth insists.

At the show of mercy, the creature opens the front door to let them leave and tells the other creatures to leave them, and the rest of the planet, alone before the house collapses into a sinkhole. The rains stop and the Delgados find Seattle almost completely submerged in water. The family sets off on a salvaged boat to travel the now-flooded planet, finding other survivors by using a radio.

== Cast ==
- Greta Lee as Ann
- Wagner Moura as Jason
- Riley Chung as 8-year-old Ruth
  - Emma Ho as 13-year-old Ruth
  - Arden Cho as adult Ruth (voice)
- Noah Alexander Sosnowski as 12-year-old Graham
  - Gabriel Barbosa as 17-year-old Graham
- Audrey Anderson as Susan
- Sid Edwards as Max Richardson
- Eveline Reynolds-Boison as Marcia Richardson

== Production ==
In May 2024, it was announced that Louis Leterrier would direct a science fiction horror film titled 11817, with a screenplay by Matthew Robinson. Greta Lee and Kingsley Ben-Adir were cast in the lead roles. In January 2025, Netflix acquired the project, with Wagner Moura replacing Ben-Adir.

Principal photography began on April 21, 2025, with Gabriel Barbosa, Noah Alexander Sosnowski, Emma Ho, and Riley Chung joining the cast. Filming occurred mostly in England at Shepperton Studios.

== Release ==
The Last House was released on August 7, 2026, on Netflix.

=== Advertising billboard ===
In August 2026, an actor was propped up living inside of a furnished billboard set on Sunset Boulevard and Selma Avenue as a marketing stunt in Los Angeles, California. The robe-clad performer waves to drivers, monitors the strip with binoculars, and communicates using a whiteboard.

== Reception ==
On the review aggregator website Rotten Tomatoes, 23% of 82 critics' reviews are positive, with an average rating of 4.5/10. The website's consensus reads: "The Last House drags a capable cast through an increasingly repetitive narrative without delivering the suspense or thematic depth its premise demands." Metacritic, which uses a weighted average, assigned the film a score of 42 out of 100, based on 21 critics, indicating "mixed or average" reviews.

David Rooney of The Hollywood Reporter described it as a "claustrophobic sci-fi film", noting that the narrative loses momentum once it moves from suspense into survival. Rooney felt the film relied heavily on the strong lead performances of Greta Lee and Wagner Moura to elevate a script that ultimately fails to deliver a satisfying conclusion.

Brian Tallerico of RogerEbert.com gave the film 1.5 stars out of 4 and called it "frustrating and forgettable". Victoria Luxford of NME gave the film 2/5 stars and criticized the pacing saying the payoff wasn't worth the wait.

More positively, Empire gave the film 3/5 stars and said "Arthur C. Clarke this ain’t, but as a modestly diverting couple of hours it’s a perfectly good time." Benjamin Lee of The Guardian also gave the film 3/5 and while conceding the film wasn't good enough for a theatrical release it was "just about good enough for a low-stakes click".
