= Slumberland (film) =

2022 film by Francis Lawrence

- Official release poster
- Directed by: Francis Lawrence
- Screenplay by: David Guion; Michael Handelman
- Based on: Little Nemo by Winsor McCay
- Produced by: Peter Chernin; Jenno Topping; David Ready; Francis Lawrence
- Starring: Jason Momoa; Marlow Barkley; Chris O'Dowd; Kyle Chandler; Weruche Opia
- Cinematography: Jo Willems
- Edited by: Mark Yoshikawa
- Music by: Pinar Toprak
- Production company: Chernin Entertainment
- Distributed by: Netflix
- Release date: November 18, 2022
- Running time: 117 minutes
- Country: United States
- Language: English
- Budget: $150 million

Slumberland is a 2022 American fantasy adventure film directed by Francis Lawrence and written by David Guion and Michael Handelman. Based on the comic strip Little Nemo in Slumberland by Winsor McCay, the film stars Jason Momoa, Chris O'Dowd, Kyle Chandler, Weruche Opia, and introducing Marlow Barkley in her film debut as Nemo.

The film tells the story of a young girl whose father is lost at sea. She enters Slumberland where she befriends a renegade character who is involved in a plot to obtain a special pearl that may have the power to reunite her with her father.

Slumberland was released on November 18, 2022, by Netflix. It received generally mixed reviews from critics.

== Plot ==
Nemo is a young girl who lives in a lighthouse with her widowed father Peter, a lighthouse keeper. Every night, Peter tells her wild bedtime stories about his adventures with Flip, his old partner.

One night during a storm, Peter heads out to help a distressed boat. Nemo is later visited by their family friend Carla, who informs her that her dad was lost at sea. With Nemo devastated by the news, Carla persuades Nemo's estranged uncle Philip to take her in so she does not become a ward of the state.

In contrast to his brother Peter, Philip is a doorknob salesman who leads a lonely, boring, and monotonous life. Nemo moves to the city with Philip and the two find it difficult to adjust to each other. When enrolled at a local school, she struggles to fit in as she meets school counselor Ms. Arya and a student named Jamal.

One night, Nemo is awakened when her stuffed pig (Pig) comes to life. In reality, she is still asleep and in Slumberland, the world between dreams. Here, she meets Flip, learning that he is real and not simply a character her father made up. A stubborn and unscrupulous outlaw, he is looking for a map that will lead him to magical wish-granting pearls.

Nemo finds the map in the waking world and takes it back to Slumberland by sleeping through classes. Flip begrudgingly allows her to join him to search for the pearls so she can wish her father into her dreams. Nemo learns that Flip has refused to wake up for so long he no longer remembers who he is in the real world.

Flip uses the map as a guide through various people's dreams to get to the Sea of Nightmares, where the pearls are. They are attacked by Nemo's nightmare, a cloud of smoke resembling a kraken. Flip is later imprisoned by Agent Green of the Bureau of Subconscious Activities (BoSA) for intruding on people's dreams.

In the real world, Philip shows Nemo an old videotape of him and Peter playing together as children. Nemo realizes that Flip is Philip's dream alter ego. As Flip has not woken up, Philip has lost that part of his personality and become Flip's opposite: docile and unadventurous.

Nemo returns to Slumberland to rescue Flip. At the Sea of Nightmares, she reveals to him who he really is. The truth of his boring real life upsets him, so Flip decides never to wake up. Nemo is awakened by Ms. Arya, who calls Philip to bring up her progress in school. This event leads to an argument between her and Philip.

Nemo runs away from home and sails through a storm back to the lighthouse. She hits her head and passes out in the boat, sending her back to Slumberland. In the Sea of Nightmares, she acquires a wishing pearl. Flip saves her from the kraken nightmare whereas in the real world, she hits her head, falling unconscious.

Philip arranges a rescue boat captained by Carla and heads toward the lighthouse, terrified by the storm. When the nightmare grabs Flip, Nemo uses her wish to force Flip to wake up. In the real world, Philip becomes emboldened and dives into the water to rescue Nemo, who has slid underwater.

In Slumberland, Green commends Nemo on using her wish to save Flip, saying she has finally found something more important than what she has lost. Green reveals that Pig actually swallowed two pearls, allowing Nemo to wish to see her father again. Peter appears and they spend time together before he tells her that life is waiting for her in the real world and she cannot stay. Nemo says goodbye to him and wakes up, where Phillip embraces her, now embedded with the personality of Flip.

Nemo begins to improve her life in the waking world, making friends at school and repairing her relationship with her uncle as they make use of one of Peter's boats for sailing.

== Cast ==
- Marlow Barkley as Nemo, a young girl who has dreams of Slumberland. The character is a boy in the 1900s comic strip.
  - Abigail White works as Nemo's photo double.
- Jason Momoa as Flip, a con artist with sharp teeth and the ears and horns of a goat who becomes Nemo's companion and was a former friend of Nemo's father Peter. The character is a clown in the 1900s comic strip.
- Chris O'Dowd as Philip, Nemo's uncle who works as a doorknob salesman. He is the waking world counterpart of Flip.
  - Cameron Nicoll as young Phillip
- Kyle Chandler as Peter, Nemo's father and former lighthouse keeper who gets lost at sea.
  - Antonio Rane Pastore as young Peter.
- Weruche Opia as Agent Green, an operative of the Bureau of Subconscious Activities who Flip has been eluding.
- India de Beaufort as Ms. Arya, the school counselor at Nemo's school.
- Chris D'Silva as Jamal, Nemo's school friend.
- Yanna McIntosh as Carla, a family friend of Peter and Nemo.
- Jacob So as Emmett, a boy who dreams of driving a garbage truck.
- Izaak Smith as a Canadian guy who dreams about riding a giant Canada goose
- Michael Blake as an accountant whose dreams have him with more hair
- Humberly González as Graciela, a nun who dreams about being a salsa dancer.
- Ava Cheung as Ho-Sook
- Leslie Adlam as Agent Brown, an operative of the Bureau of Subconscious Activities.
- Jamillah Ross as Agent Orange, an operative of the Bureau of Subconscious Activities.
- Tonya Cornelisse as Agent Red, an operative of the Bureau of Subconscious Activities.
- Luxton Handspiker as Matt
- Katerina Taxia as Janice, a lunch lady.

== Production ==
=== Development and casting ===
On March 3, 2020, it was announced that Jason Momoa would star in a live-action adaptation of the comic strip series Little Nemo in Slumberland by Winsor McCay from director Francis Lawrence, with Netflix distributing and production starting in the summer of that same year. However, due to the COVID-19 pandemic, filming for the project was postponed. On October 12, 2020, Kyle Chandler joined the cast of the film, where Chris O'Dowd and Marlow Barkley had already been confirmed to star. The following year, on February 18, Weruche Opia and India de Beaufort were cast.

=== Filming ===
Filming began on February 18, 2021, in Toronto, and concluded on May 19, 2021.

=== Post-production ===
Pinar Toprak composed the musical score. DNEG and Framestore provided the visual effects. Additional VFX was done by Scanline VFX, Ghost VFX, Important Looking Pirates, Outpost VFX, Rodeo FX, Incessant Rain Studios. and Pinscreen, which did AI VFX. The film's main and end titles were done by Imaginary Forces.

== Release ==
Slumberland was released on November 18, 2022, by Netflix. In its first week of release Slumberland was the fifth most streamed program for the week of November 21–27 accruing over 1 billion minutes viewed across the platform.

== Reception ==
On the review aggregator website Rotten Tomatoes, 40% of 42 critics' reviews are positive, with an average rating of 5.3/10. The website's consensus reads: "Winsor McCay's classic Nemo comics are fertile ground for the right filmmaker, but Slumberland forsakes the spirit of the strips in favor of senseless spectacle." Metacritic, which uses a weighted average, assigned the film a score of 40 out of 100, based on 16 critics, indicating "mixed or average" reviews.

== Accolades ==
The film was nominated for two awards (Outstanding Animated Character in a Photoreal Feature & Outstanding Created Environment in a Photoreal Feature) at the 21st Visual Effects Society Awards.

== See also ==
- Little Nemo: Adventures in Slumberland
