= David Reidy (professor) =

American philosopher (born 1962)

David A. Reidy (born 1962) is an American philosopher, currently the Distinguished Humanities Professor at University of Tennessee.

== Early life and education ==
Reidy received a Bachelor of Arts in Philosophy/American Literature from DePauw University in 1984, a Master of Arts in Philosophy from the University of Kansas in 1992 and a Ph.D in Philosophy from University of Kansas in 1997 and a Juris Doctor from Indiana University School of Law Bloomington in 1987.
