= Apex (2026 film) =

2026 film by Baltasar Kormákur

- Release poster
- Directed by: Baltasar Kormákur
- Written by: Jeremy Robbins
- Produced by: Ian Bryce; Peter Chernin; Jenno Topping; David Ready; Charlize Theron; Beth Kono; AJ Dix; Baltasar Kormákur; Will McCance
- Starring: Charlize Theron; Taron Egerton
- Cinematography: Lawrence Sher
- Edited by: Sigurdur Eythorsson
- Music by: Högni Egilsson
- Production companies: Chernin Entertainment; Ian Bryce Productions; Denver and Delilah Productions; RVK Studios
- Distributed by: Netflix
- Release date: April 24, 2026
- Running time: 95 minutes
- Countries: Iceland; United Kingdom; United States
- Language: English

Apex is a 2026 survival thriller film directed by Baltasar Kormákur, written by Jeremy Robbins, and starring Charlize Theron and Taron Egerton. It tells the story of a rock climber and kayaker who finds herself being hunted in the wilds of Australia.

Apex was released on Netflix on April 24, 2026. It received mixed reviews from critics.

== Plot ==
While climbing the Troll Wall in Norway, adventurous couple Sasha and Tommy are caught in a storm. Tommy is struck by a falling boulder, and the weight of his unconscious body threatens to drag Sasha off the cliff face. She is forced to release his rope, and he plummets to his death.

Five months later in Australia, a grieving Sasha drives alone through Wandarra National Park with Tommy's lucky compass with the intent to spread his ashes. A ranger warns her of a string of disappearances in the region, and she is harassed by hunters at a service station. Ben, a local who sells his own jerky, intervenes and gives her directions to a secluded campsite. That night, Sasha is harassed again by the hunters, so she takes refuge in her car until they leave.

The next day, Sasha kayaks through the rapids and camps overnight, but wakes to find her bag missing. She stumbles across Ben's camp, where he offers her breakfast and additional supplies. He reveals that he has been watching her, and an unsettled Sasha tries to leave, realizing he stole her bag. Ben returns her backpack, but brandishes a crossbow and boombox, telling her she has until the end of "Go" by The Chemical Brothers to get as far away from as she can. As Sasha flees, Ben maniacally jumps and dances around.

Escaping to the river, Sasha loses her kayak on the rapids. She hears voices of a family nearby, only to find a video recording planted to lure her. Ben shoots at her, forcing her back into the river as he pursues her through the wilderness. After hiding in a ravine, she attempts to steal Ben's canoe, but is caught in a bear trap and captured. Having researched Sasha after she signed in at the ranger station, Ben questions her about Tommy's death.

Rappelling into a hidden cave, Ben chains Sasha up with the carcasses of the many missing people, including the family in the video. He reveals he is a ritualistic cannibal who turns his victims into jerky, including his own mother. Sasha bites off one of Ben's ears and flees, still shackled, but he follows her over a waterfall. While she attempts to break her bonds, he nearly strangles her, but she subdues him with a rock, giving his leg a compound fracture. Trapped together in a deserted canyon, a delirious Sasha tells Ben she feels guilty for Tommy's death.

In the morning, the pair reach a wary compromise: As the shackled Sasha and injured Ben cannot escape on their own, they will conduct a tandem climb out of the canyon. Unlocking Sasha's restraints but tying himself to her climbing harness, Ben threatens to pull her off the cliff if she tries to escape. As they ascend, she fashions a Prusik knot for him to pull himself up, but manages to free herself from the harness and sends him falling to his death. She continues the climb, now without gear, and reaches the top.

Rescued by a passersby, Sasha returns to the ranger station and alerts the authorities, who recover at least twenty bodies from Ben's hideout. Reaching the beach, Sasha pays a final tribute to Tommy, throwing his compass into the ocean.

== Cast ==
- Charlize Theron as Sasha, a rock climber
- Taron Egerton as Ben, a local
- Eric Bana as Tommy, a rock climber and Sasha's husband
- Matt Whelan as one of the hunters
- Bessie Holland as a cashier
- Aaron Pedersen as a park ranger
- Rob Carlton as 2nd Hunter
- Duncan Fellows as Dad
- Julia Ohannessian as Mom
- Niam Hogan as Boy
- Willow Seager as Teenage Daughter
- Zac Garred as Sean
- Caitlin Stasey as Leah

== Production ==
=== Development and casting ===
Jeremy Robbins wrote the script for Apex, and at end of the 2021, it was voted onto the Black List of best unproduced screenplays for the year. Netflix later secured the rights for the film in February 2024, with Ian Bryce and Chernin Entertainment as producers. The film is directed by Baltasar Kormákur from a Jeremy Robbins screenplay. Charlize Theron stars and is producer on the film alongside Dawn Olmstead, AJ Dix and Beth Kono. Kormákur is also producing through RVK Productions, as well as Peter Chernin, Jenno Topping and David Ready as well as Bryce through Chernin Entertainment. Taron Egerton joined the cast in November 2024, with Eric Bana joining in January 2025.

=== Filming ===
Principal photography began in Sydney and around the Blue Mountains, New South Wales, Australia, in February 2025.

Egerton campaigned for the use of The Chemical Brothers track Go and apparently approached the band to permit its inclusion.

=== Post-production ===
The film's visual effects were supervised by Enrik Pavdeja and produced by Gavin Round, with contributions from Framestore (who previously collaborated with Kormákur on Beast and Everest), ILM, Rising Sun Pictures, Union VFX and Host VFX.

== Release ==
Apex was released on Netflix on April 24, 2026.

== Reception ==
On the review aggregator website Rotten Tomatoes, 68% of 109 critics' reviews are positive, with an average rating of 6.0/10. The website's consensus reads: "Benefitting from astonishing Australian locations and Charlize Theron's raw athleticism while skimping on the finer details, Apex doesn't mark the zenith of survival thrillers but makes for a solid entry." Metacritic, which uses a weighted average, assigned the film a score of 58 out of 100, based on 23 critics, indicating "mixed or average" reviews.

Luke Buckmaster of The Guardian gave the film two stars out of five, stating "It's hard not to be cynical about movies like Apex, or to second guess its format: a trajectory whereby the steely protagonist with a dramatic backstory narrowly escapes death before eventually turning the tables on their assailant... The whole affair feels slick but soulless, with no personality or – despite the lush settings – any real sense of place." Tomris Laffly of RogerEbert.com gave the movie three stars out of four and added "Kormákur is masterly in utilizing his locations, seamlessly marrying every turn, cave, rapid, and waterfall with the narrative, realizing their full potential. Meanwhile, Egerton's maniacal scream and frighteningly livid eyes, and Theron's composed strength and endurance make a worthy pairing, with the balance slowly shifting between the two."

In a negative review, M.N. Miller of InSession Film described Apex as "a hollow, algorithm-driven action film that mistakes noise for entertainment" that "gives streaming a bad name."
