= Ian Bryce =

Film producer

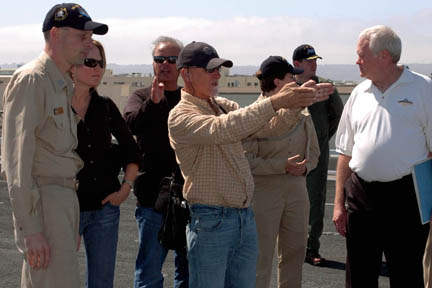
- Bryce (center) in 2008
- Born: November 30, 1956 (age 69); Totnes, England
- Occupation: Film producer
- Years active: 1983–present

Ian Bryce (born November 30, 1956) is an English film producer. Starting as a production assistant on Return of the Jedi in 1983, he has since served as a producer for films including Twister, Saving Private Ryan, The Island, Spider-Man, Transformers, and Teenage Mutant Ninja Turtles. According to The Numbers, his films have grossed $7 billion worldwide—making him the 14th highest-grossing film producer as of 2026.

== Early life ==
Bryce grew up in Bristol, England, but moved to the US as a young adult.

== Career ==
Bryce has won and been nominated for many awards, including multiple Golden Globe Awards, Academy Awards and BAFTA nominations for his work as a producer. For Steven Spielberg's World War II drama Saving Private Ryan, he won a Golden Globe Award and nominations from the Academy Awards and BAFTA. The latter film was the second-highest grossing film of 1998. Almost Famous, another Bryce production, received a BAFTA for Best Film in 2000. Bryce co-produced each the films in the Michael Bay Transformers series, one of the highest-grossing film franchises of the 21st century.

== Personal life ==
After marrying his wife Taylor, they moved to Los Angeles. They have two kids, Mac Bryce, and Alex Bryce.

== Filmography ==
Producer

- The Beverly Hillbillies (1993)
- Twister (1996)
- Hard Rain (1998)
- Saving Private Ryan (1998)
- Almost Famous (2000)
- Spider-Man (2002)
- Tears of the Sun (2003)
- The Island (2005)
- Transformers (2007)
- Transformers: Revenge of the Fallen (2009)
- Transformers: Dark of the Moon (2011)
- Pain & Gain (2013)
- World War Z (2013)
- Transformers: Age of Extinction (2014)
- Teenage Mutant Ninja Turtles (2014)
- Whiskey Tango Foxtrot (2016)
- War Machine (2017)
- Transformers: The Last Knight (2017)
- 6 Underground (2019)
- Finding 'Ohana (2021)
- Ambulance (2022)
- Apex (2026)
- The Mandalorian and Grogu (2026)

Executive producer

- Speed (1994)
- Hancock (2008)

Associate producer

- Ewoks: The Battle for Endor (1985)
- Howard the Duck (1986)
- Batman Returns (1992)

Production manager

- Who Framed Roger Rabbit (1988)
- Indiana Jones and the Last Crusade (1989)
- Field of Dreams (1989)
- The Rocketeer (1991)

Other credits

Year	Title	Role
1983	Return of the Jedi	Production assistant
1984	Indiana Jones and the Temple of Doom	Second assistant director
1993	Rising Sun	Line producer

== See also ==
- List of accolades received by Almost Famous
- 1998 in film
