= Jenno Topping =

American film producer

Jenno Topping is an American film producer.

== Career ==
Films she has produced include Dr. Dolittle (1998), Charlie's Angels (2000), The Heat (2013), St. Vincent (2014), Hidden Figures (2016) (which earned her an Oscar nomination for Best Picture with Donna Gigliotti, Peter Chernin, Pharrell Williams, and Theodore Melfi), The Greatest Showman (2017), Ford v Ferrari (2019) (which earned her another Oscar with Chernin and its director James Mangold), Backrooms (2026), and both Rise and War of the Planet of the Apes (2014, 17).

== Filmography ==
She was a producer in all films unless otherwise noted.

=== Film ===
Year	Film	Credit
1995	The Brady Bunch Movie	Co-producer
1998	Can't Hardly Wait	
1998	Dr. Dolittle	Executive producer
2000	28 Days	
2000	Charlie's Angels	Executive producer
2002	I Spy	
2003	Charlie's Angels: Full Throttle	Executive producer
2004	Surviving Christmas	
2005	Guess Who	
2006	Catch and Release	
2010	Country Strong	
2011	Seeking Justice	Executive producer
2013	The Heat	
2014	Dawn of the Planet of the Apes	Executive producer
2014	St. Vincent	
2014	Exodus: Gods and Kings	
2015	Spy	
2016	Mike and Dave Need Wedding Dates	
2016	Miss Peregrine's Home for Peculiar Children	
2016	Hidden Figures	
2017	Snatched	
2017	War for the Planet of the Apes	Executive producer
2017	The Mountain Between Us	
2017	The Greatest Showman	
2018	Red Sparrow	
2019	Tolkien	
2019	Ford v Ferrari	
2019	Spies in Disguise	
2020	Underwater	
2021	Fear Street Part One: 1994	
2021	Fear Street Part Two: 1978	
2021	Fear Street Part Three: 1666	
2022	Slumberland	
2023	Luther: The Fallen Sun	
2023	Dicks: The Musical	
2025	Back in Action	
2025	Fear Street: Prom Queen	
2026	Apex	
2026	Backrooms	
2026	The Last House	
TBA	36 Questions	
TBA	Blackout	
TBA	Ever After High	
TBA	Queen & Country	

As an actress

Year	Film	Role
2004	Incident at Loch Ness	Party Guest

Location management

Year	Film	Role
1991	The Rapture	Assistant location manager

Thanks

Year	Film	Role
1997	Good Will Hunting	Thanks
2003	Grand Theft Parsons	Special thanks
2014	Hollidaysburg	Special thanks

=== Television ===
Year	Title	Credit
2019−2021	See	Executive producer
2019−2021	Truth Be Told	Executive producer
2020	P-Valley	Executive producer
2021	Bombay Begums	Executive producer
2024	Exploding Kittens	Executive producer
2026	Man on Fire	Executive producer

== Awards and nominations ==
- 2019: Best Picture (for Ford v Ferrari, Nominated)
- 2019: Producers Guild of America Award for Best Theatrical Motion Picture (for Ford v Ferrari, Nominated)
- 2016: Best Picture (for Hidden Figures, Nominated)
- 2016: Producers Guild of America Award for Best Theatrical Motion Picture (for Hidden Figures, Nominated)
