= List of accolades received by Almost Famous =

This is a list of awards and nominations received by Almost Famous.

== Organizations ==
Organization	Award category	Recipients	Result
Academy Awards	Best Actress in a Supporting Role	Kate Hudson	Nominated
Academy Awards	Best Actress in a Supporting Role	Frances McDormand	Nominated
Academy Awards	Best Original Screenplay	Cameron Crowe	Won
Academy Awards	Best Film Editing	Joe Hutshing and Saar Klein	Nominated
British Academy Film Awards	Best Actress in a Leading Role	Kate Hudson	Nominated
British Academy Film Awards	Best Actress in a Supporting Role	Frances McDormand	Nominated
British Academy Film Awards	Best Film	Ian Bryce and Cameron Crowe	Nominated
British Academy Film Awards	Best Film Music	Nancy Wilson	Nominated
British Academy Film Awards	Best Screenplay – Original	Cameron Crowe	Won
British Academy Film Awards	Best Sound	Doug Hemphill, Rick Kline, Paul Massey, Michael Wilhoit and Jeff Wexler	Won
Golden Globe Awards	Best Actress in a Supporting Role	Kate Hudson	Won
Golden Globe Awards	Best Actress in a Supporting Role	Frances McDormand	Nominated
Golden Globe Awards	Best Film – Musical or Comedy		Won
Golden Globe Awards	Best Screenplay	Cameron Crowe	Nominated
Grammy Awards	Best Compilation Soundtrack Album – Film, Television or other Visual Media	Danny Bramson and Cameron Crowe	Won
Satellite Awards	Best Actor in a Supporting Role – Musical or Comedy	Philip Seymour Hoffman	Nominated
Satellite Awards	Best Actress in a Supporting Role – Musical or Comedy	Kate Hudson	Won
Satellite Awards	Best Actress in a Supporting Role – Musical or Comedy	Frances McDormand	Nominated
Satellite Awards	Best Director	Cameron Crowe	Nominated
Satellite Awards	Best Film – Musical or Comedy		Nominated
Satellite Awards	Best Screenplay – Original	Cameron Crowe	Nominated

Also in 2004, the American Film Institute nominated the song "Tiny Dancer" from this film for AFI's 100 Years...100 Songs.

== Guilds ==
Guild	Award category	Recipients	Result
American Cinema Editors	Best Edited Film – Musical or Comedy	Joe Hutshing and Saar Klein	Won
Art Directors Guild	Excellence in Production Design – Contemporary Film	Clay Griffith, Clayton Hartley, Virginia Randolph and Eric Rosenberg	Nominated
Costume Designers Guild	Excellence in Period/Fantasy Film	Betsy Heimann	Nominated
Directors Guild of America	Outstanding Directing – Motion Pictures	Cameron Crowe	Nominated
Motion Picture Sound Editors	Best Sound Editing – Musical Film (Domestic and Foreign)	Carlton Kaller	Won
Motion Picture Sound Editors	Best Sound Editing – Dialogue & ADR, Domestic Film	Laura Graham, Laura Harris, Kimaree Long, Kelly Oxford and Michael Wilhoit	Nominated
Producers Guild of America	Motion Picture Producer of the Year		Nominated
Screen Actors Guild	Outstanding Actress in a Supporting Role	Kate Hudson	Nominated
Screen Actors Guild	Outstanding Actress in a Supporting Role	Frances McDormand	Nominated
Screen Actors Guild	Outstanding Cast		Nominated
Writers Guild of America	Best Screenplay – Original	Cameron Crowe	Nominated

== Critics groups ==
Group	Award category	Recipients	Result
Broadcast Film Critics Association	Best Supporting Actress	Frances McDormand (also for Wonder Boys)	Won
Broadcast Film Critics Association	Best Original Screenplay	Cameron Crowe	Won
Dallas-Fort Worth Film Critics	Best Actress in a Supporting Role	Kate Hudson	Won
Florida Film Critics	Best Actress in a Supporting Role	Frances McDormand (also for Wonder Boys)	Won
Florida Film Critics	Newcomer of the Year	Kate Hudson	Won
Kansas City Film Critics	Best Actress in a Supporting Role	Kate Hudson	Won
London Film Critics Circle	Actor of the Year	Philip Seymour Hoffman (also for Flawless)	Nominated
London Film Critics Circle	Screenwriter of the Year	Cameron Crowe	Nominated
Los Angeles Film Critics	Best Actress in a Supporting Role	Frances McDormand (also for Wonder Boys)	Won
San Diego Film Critics	Best Actress in a Supporting Role	Frances McDormand	Won
San Diego Film Critics	Best Director	Cameron Crowe	Won
San Diego Film Critics	Best Film		Won
San Diego Film Critics	Best Screenplay – Original	Cameron Crowe	Won
Southeastern Film Critics	Best Actress in a Supporting Role	Frances McDormand	Won
Southeastern Film Critics	Best Film		Won
Southeastern Film Critics	Best Screenplay – Original	Cameron Crowe	Won
