= TCG (company) =

American investment advisory firm

TCG Capital Management, LP
- Trade name: The Chernin Group
- Company type: Private
- Founded: 2010; 16 years ago
- Founders: Peter Chernin; Jesse Jacobs
- Headquarters: Los Angeles, California, United States
- Area served: Worldwide
- Key people: Peter Chernin; Jesse Jacobs; Mike Kerns
- Number of employees: 50
- Divisions: TCG Portfolio Companies
- Website: tcg.co

TCG Capital Management, LP, doing business as TCG or the Chernin Group, is an American investment advisory firm focused on private equity investments in the media, entertainment, technology, sports and consumer and digital media sectors.

== History ==
Peter Chernin and Jesse Jacobs founded TCG as the Chernin Group in 2010 as a holding company to acquire and operate direct-to-consumer brands in media and technology.

TCG hired Mike Kerns, formerly a senior executive at Yahoo!, as president of digital in 2015.

In 2018, Chernin, Jacobs, and Kerns formed TCG, an investment advisory firm based in Los Angeles, San Francisco, and New York. TCG manages private equity investments in the media, entertainment, technology, sports and consumer sectors. Chernin, Jacobs, and Kerns are the co-founders and managing partners of the investment advisory firm.

== Funding ==
In April 2012, the Financial Times reported that TCG had received $200 million in new funding from a group of investors led by Providence Equity Partners.

In November 2019, TCG announced "that it closed an inaugural fund with over $700 million of commitments from investors."

== Investments ==
TCG had acquired the majority stake of anime video-on-demand service Crunchyroll in December 2013. Both TCG and AT&T later formed a joint venture known as Otter Media in 2014. TCG sold its controlling interest in Otter Media (including Crunchyroll) to AT&T in August 2018, reportedly for around $1 billion.

As of November 2019, TCG had "invested over $200 million in emerging businesses, with an average equity investment of $25 million-$75 million," including in the media and commerce site Food52, tabletop games company Exploding Kittens, MeatEater, Headspace, The Action Network, online wedding registry Zola, Cameo, ShopShops, and Dadi. In January 2022, TCG invested $17.5 million in Epic Gardening. TGC invested in the youth sports parent company Unrivaled Sports, established by Josh Harris and David Blitzer in March 2024.

TCG previously held a majority share in Barstool Sports, which it had acquired from Dave Portnoy in 2016 at a $10 to $15 million valuation. In January 2020, TCG/Barstool sold 36% of Barstool to Penn National Gaming for $163 million and sold the remaining stake in the company to Penn in 2023 for $388 million.
