= Back in Action (2025 film) =

Film by Seth Gordon

- Release poster
- Directed by: Seth Gordon
- Written by: Seth Gordon; Brendan O'Brien
- Produced by: Peter Chernin; Jenno Topping; Sharla Sumpter Bridgett; Beau Bauman; Seth Gordon
- Starring: Jamie Foxx; Cameron Diaz; Andrew Scott; Jamie Demetriou; Kyle Chandler; Glenn Close
- Cinematography: Ken Seng
- Edited by: Peter S. Elliot
- Music by: Christopher Lennertz
- Production companies: Chernin Entertainment; Exhibit A; Good One
- Distributed by: Netflix
- Release date: January 17, 2025
- Running time: 114 minutes
- Country: United States
- Language: English
- Budget: $207.2 million (gross); $158.9 million (net)

Back in Action is a 2025 American action comedy film directed by Seth Gordon from a script he co-wrote with Brendan O'Brien. It stars Jamie Foxx and Cameron Diaz as two CIA operatives who are pulled back into espionage after 15 years living incognito with their two children, when their secret cover is blown. Andrew Scott, Jamie Demetriou, Kyle Chandler, and Glenn Close also star in supporting roles.

The film was released by Netflix on January 17, 2025.

== Plot ==
CIA NOC operatives Matt and his pregnant fiancée Emily are tasked by their superior and friend Chuck to secure the Industrial Control Systems (ICS) – a device that can control any electronic system, from the Polish KGB agent-turned terrorist Balthazzar Gor during his children's grandiose birthday party. They manage to steal the device, but narrowly escaped death from the plane crash when the flight crew–revealed to be under Gor's payroll to retrieve the device, ambushes them on the return flight. Realizing someone must have fed the flight crew information of their Key, the pair decide to go off grid.

Fifteen years later, the now married Matt and Emily reside in Atlanta under new identities while trying to care for their children Leo and Alice. They spot Alice inside the nightclub but are forced into a brawl when Alice's club-going friends becomes aggressive. Their actions became a viral sensation and attracted the attention of both Chuck, and Gor's Polish–Belarusian mercenary group Volka, who shoots Chuck while he attempts to warn Matt and Emily.

Matt and Emily briefly loses Volka's mercenaries, allowing them to take the children from school to escape from Atlanta onto a flight to England, where Matt had hidden the ICS Key inside the manor belonging to Emily's estranged mother, former MI6 sniper, Ginny Curtis. Arriving in Heathrow, the family is again pursued by Volka, as well as the MI6, led by Emily's ex-boyfriend Baron. While they had hidden their former identities from their children, the couple are forced to reveal the truth to them once they witness their parents fending off Volka's mercenaries and evading the pursuing MI6.

When Matt and Emily find the ICS Key, Volka's mercenaries raid Ginny's manor. Ginny fends off against a few of Volka's operatives, but her partner Nigel is injured. Chuck arrives, revealing that not only he faked his death, but also is working with Gor and Volka after losing his job as a direct consequence of Matt and Emily being presumed dead by the CIA for going off-grid. Matt and Emily are forced to surrender the ICS Key to save their kids, but they are knocked out and Chuck's Volka operatives take Leo and Alice anyway.

Using Leo's smart ring, they track them down to a black-tie event in Tate Modern, London, where Chuck plans to sell the ICS Key to the highest bidder. As a demonstration, his tech assistant Daphne uses the Key to hack the power station to trigger a brief blackout across London, as well as the Thames Barrier to forcibly open its floodgates. Matt and Emily infiltrate the museum, knocking out Chuck and Gor's guards while searching for their children.

The couple are followed by Baron and MI6, who also arrive to apprehend Chuck. While Baron's agents subdue the Volka operatives, the couple, with assistance from Ginny, pursue Chuck. He intends to escape London with Leo and Alice through the Thames Barrier. Nigel spots Daphne and crashes his van into hers, rendering her unconscious and securing the ICS Key. Ginny guides Nigel to close the Thames Barrier while Emily commandeers a boat, and she and Matt catch up to Chuck. Leo and Alice jump into the water, as Emily and Matt subdue Chuck. They leave him on the boat as it crashes into the now closing barrier, presumingly killing him.

Rescued by both the police and MI6, the family rest in relief as they reconcile with Emily's mother. As the entire family attends Alice's soccer game, Matt and Emily are met by Baron. He informs them that Chuck's body has never been found, suggesting he may still be alive, and proposes they recruit Emily's father, whom Matt is unaware of.

== Cast ==
- Jamie Foxx as Matt, Emily's husband who's a former CIA operative
- Cameron Diaz as Emily, Matt's wife who's a former CIA operative
- Andrew Scott as Baron, MI6 agent, who Emily briefly dated
- Jamie Demetriou as Nigel, Ginny's boyfriend
- Kyle Chandler as Chuck, Emily's and Matt's former CIA supervisor
- Glenn Close as Ginny, Emily's mother and former legendary MI6 sniper
- McKenna Roberts as Alice, Emily and Matt's daughter
- Rylan Jackson as Leo, Emily and Matt's son

In addition, Fola Evans-Akingbola appears as Wendy, Baron's MI6 colleague.

== Production ==
In June 2022, it was reported that Cameron Diaz was coming out of retirement for a Seth Gordon and Brendan O'Brien penned action comedy entitled Back in Action, also set to star Jamie Foxx. Beau Bauman was revealed to be producing for Good One Productions with Seth Gordon producing for Exhibit A and Foxx, Datari Turner, O'Brien and Mark McNair executive producing. In August 2022, Foxx spoke about persuading Diaz (whose last film prior to her retirement in 2014 was Annie, which she and Foxx also starred in) to join the cast, telling Entertainment Tonight that "Cameron is such an incredible force and she has done so much in this business" and that he asked her "'Do you wanna have some fun? Just have some fun!' And I think that's what brought her to it...we're so happy that it's happening and looking forward to it".

In November 2022, Glenn Close and Kyle Chandler were added to the cast. In February 2023, Andrew Scott, McKenna Roberts, Rylan Jackson and Jamie Demetriou joined the cast. Principal photography took place in London from December 2, 2022, to March 9, 2023. In late February 2023, Diaz shot scenes at the River Thames. Filming in Atlanta began on March 28 and wrapped in late April. In mid-April, while Foxx was hospitalized for a medical emergency, body doubles were used to film his remaining scenes. The opening scene showing a cityscape was filmed in Ljubljana, Slovenia. Netflix spent $207.2 million producing the film, which came down to a net cost of $158.9 million after UK tax incentives.

While Gordon and O'Brien were solely credited with the screenplay, various contributions were made by Andrea Berloff, Matteo Borghese, Joel Church-Cooper, Adam Cole-Kelly, Dana Fox, Paul Fruchbom, John Gatins, Joe Nussbaum, Cassie Pappas, Lennon Parham, Sam Pitman, Ellen Shanman, Laura Solon, David Stassen, Jessica St. Clair, Victoria Strouse, and Lillian Yu.

== Release ==
Back in Action was released by Netflix on January 17, 2025. It was originally set to be released on November 15, 2024, before being pushed to its current release date.

The film amassed 46.8 million views in its first three days, giving it the biggest opening weekend for an English-language Netflix film since The Adam Project.

== Critical response ==
On the review aggregator website Rotten Tomatoes, 31% of 98 critics' reviews are positive, with an average rating of 4.4/10. The website's consensus reads: "It's good to have Diaz and Foxx back, but they deserve a warmer welcome than this rote action-comedy." Metacritic, which uses a weighted average, assigned the film a score of 46 out of 100, based on 23 critics, indicating "mixed or average" reviews.

Christy Lemire of RogerEbert.com gave the film one out of four stars and wrote, "Back in Action isn't as obnoxiously soulless as Red Notice, but it's firmly within that subgenre of glossy, globetrotting action pictures you can stream while you fold your laundry. It all feels so cynical."

Richard Roeper of the Chicago Sun-Times gave it two and a half out of four stars, writing, "Director Seth Gordon (Four Christmases, Horrible Bosses) knows how to film fast-moving comedies with star appeal, and Diaz (who hasn't lost an ounce of onscreen charisma) and Foxx are terrific together, but wouldn't it have been lovely if they had tackled more creative and challenging material? Trading quips while engaging in high-wire action sequences that defy all credibility is the movie equivalent of ordering fast food for breakfast, lunch and dinner when there's a whole world of more interesting menus out there."

== Viewership ==
According to data from Showlabs, Back in Action ranked first on Netflix in the United States during the week of 20–26 January 2025.
