= Malaria No More =

Non-profit organization

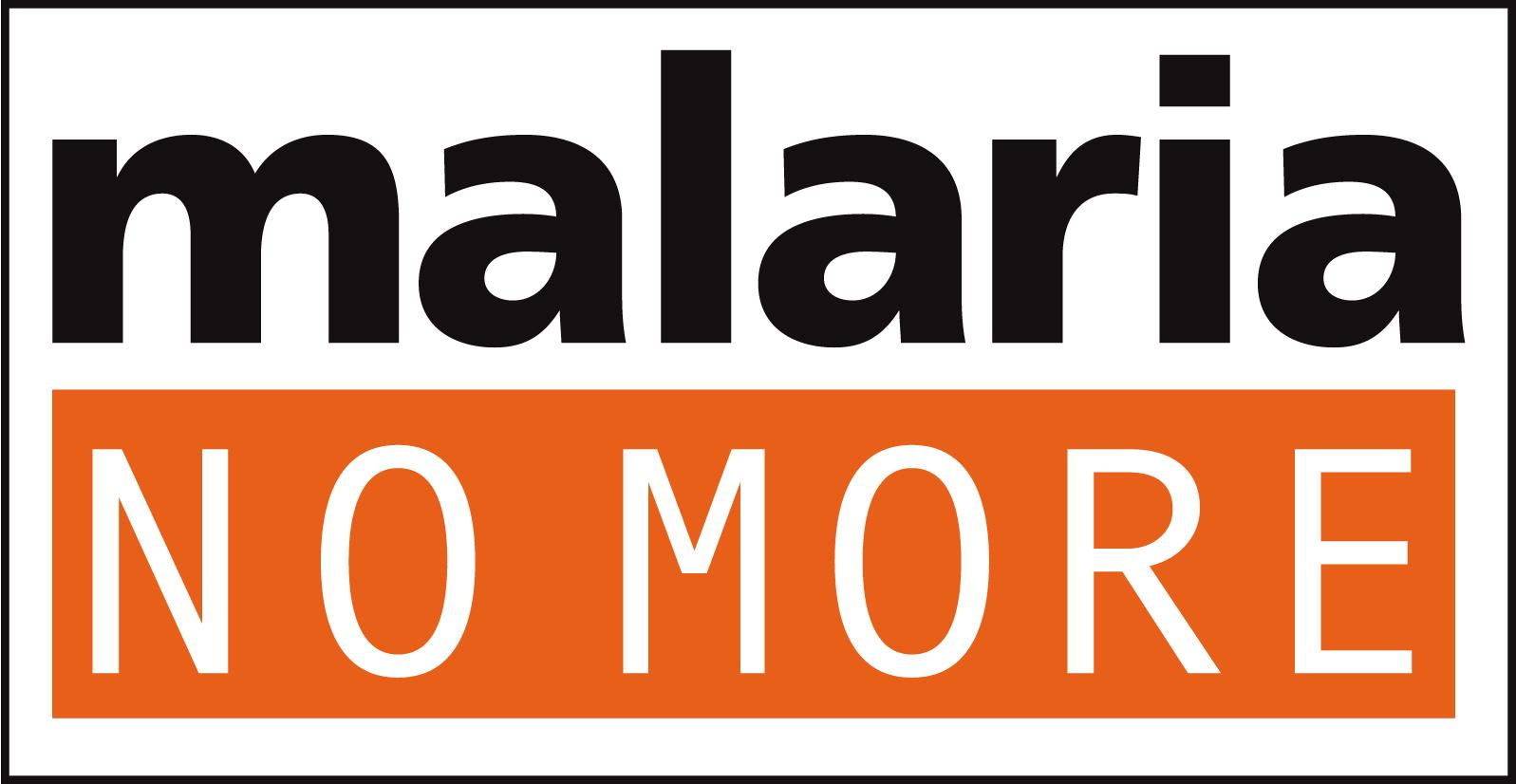
- Malaria No More logo
- Founded: December 2006
- Founder: Peter Chernin and Raymond G. Chambers
- Type: Nonprofit organization
- Location: Seattle
- Region served: Worldwide
- Key people: Timothy "Scott" Case
- Website: www.malarianomore.org

Malaria No More is a nonprofit organization that seeks to eradicate malaria. The organization has offices in the United States, as well as affiliates in India, Japan and the United Kingdom, and is known for its participation in the Idol Gives Back charity specials.

== History ==
Malaria No More was established in December 2006 by business leaders looking to apply private sector expertise and entrepreneurial methods to tackling malaria. In 2008, it was one of six charities supported by the TV show American Idol, as part of its "Idol Gives Back" campaign.

Since Malaria No More's inception - at the White House event that launched the U.S. President's Malaria Initiative in 2006 - Malaria No More has worked to mobilize political commitment, funding and innovation, with the goal of "ending malaria within our generation."

In June 2024, the World Economic Forum noted that The Malaria 'Dividend' report by Malaria No More UK found that reducing malaria by 90% by 2030 could "increase Africa’s GDP by $126.9 billion – or $16 billion per year".
