= David Ready =

American film producer

David Ready is an American film producer and production executive, and President of Film at Chernin Entertainment.

== Life and career ==
A native of Boston and graduate of Washington University in St. Louis, Ready previously was a production executive for Jerry Weintraub and subsequently at Di Bonaventura Pictures. He was featured in The Hollywood Reporter's 2011 "Next Gen" list. He joined Chernin Entertainment in 2013, where his producing credits include Mike and Dave Need Wedding Dates, The Mountain Between Us (2017), Red Sparrow (2018),Tolkien, Netflix's Fear Street trilogy, Slumberland, and Luther: The Fallen Sun. His upcoming credits include future installments of the Fear Street franchise with Netflix, and a biopic about the rock band, Sublime with 3000 Pictures, director, Francis Lawrence, and writer, Chris Mundy.

In early 2025, he produced Netflix's upcoming Apex (2026 film) starring Charlize Theron and Taron Egerton.

His earlier credits include Transformers: Revenge of the Fallen, Salt, Red and Red 2, Jack Ryan: Shadow Recruit, and Man on a Ledge.

== Filmography ==
He was a producer in all films unless otherwise noted.

=== Film ===
Year	Film	Credit
2009	Transformers: Revenge of the Fallen	Production executive
2009	Imagine That	Production executive
2010	Salt	Production executive
2010	Red	Co-producer
2012	Man on a Ledge	Executive producer
2013	Red 2	Executive producer
2014	Jack Ryan: Shadow Recruit	Co-producer
2016	Mike and Dave Need Wedding Dates	Executive producer
2017	The Mountain Between Us	
2018	Red Sparrow	
2019	Tolkien	
2021	Fear Street Part One: 1994	
2021	Fear Street Part Two: 1978	
2021	Fear Street Part Three: 1666	
2022	Slumberland	
2023	Luther: The Fallen Sun	
2026	Apex	
TBA	The Big Fix	
