= 44 Blue Productions =

American unscripted production company

- Type: Subsidiary
- Founded: June 1984; 42 years ago
- Founders: Rasha Drachkovitch; Stephanie Drachkovitch
- Headquarters: Burbank, California, United States
- Parent: Red Arrow Studios (2016–2022); The North Road Company (2022–present)
- Website: www.44blue.com

44 Blue Productions is an American unscripted production company that is owned by Peter Chernin's global production company The North Road Company, located in Burbank, California and was founded in June 1984 by Rasha Drachkovitch and Stephanie Noonan Drachkovitch that supplies reality television, documentary, lifestyle and action-adventure programming for US broadcast and cable outlets including Animal Planet,.

== History ==
In May 2015, 44 Blue Productions expanded into the virtual reality operation by launching its VR content studio Ovrture, the new virtual reality unit would handle 360-degree content adapations based on 44 Blue's programming while the new VR studio Ovrture would create in-house programming and would be based in Los Angeles with Mike Drachkovitch, son of 44 Blue's co-founders Rasha Drachkovitch & Stephanie Noonan Drachkovitch, would lead 44 Blue Productions' new virtual reality studio as president while brothers David and Dan Holecheck, founders of graphics & effects studio Duality Filmworks, would lead 44 Blue's VR studio Ovrture as head of production and head of post-production.

In July 2016, German entertainment production & distribution studio Red Arrow Entertainment Group (now Seven.One Studios) acquired a 61% majority stake in 44 Blue Productions alongside its VR content studio Ovrture to expand Red Arrow Entertainment Group's American operations with 44 Blue Productions became a subsidiary of Red Arrow Entertainment Group while its distribution arm Red Arrow International would handle distribution to 44 Blue's future programming.

However twelve years later in July 2022 when Peter Chernin established a global independent and production content studio that would bring his film & television production company Chernin Entertainment and its unscripted production studio Words + Pictures entitled The North Road Company and the two subsidiaries became part of his new company as labels, 44 Blue Productions' German entertainment & international distribution parent company Red Arrow Studios exited the American television production industry had sold its American entertainment production operations including 44 Blue Productions to Peter Chernin's new global studio The North Road Company had brought the US assets of German entertainment & international distribution company Red Arrow Studios from ProSiebenSat.1 Media, including 44 Blue Productions, became a subsidiary of Chernin's new global content company, The North Road Company. At the same time, its newly established international division, North Road International (which is based in London, England), had taken over 44 Blue's programming catalogue and would distribute 44 Blue's future productions.

On August 29 2023 a year following Red Arrow's selling of its American unscripted studios including 44 Blue Productions to Peter Chernin's global production studio The North Road Company back in July 2022, 44 Blue Productions had appointed former NBCUniversal unscripted alum Lee Straus as their executive VP business & legal affairs at 44 Blue Productions.

In January 2026, French media entertainment company Mediawan had entered advanced talks to acquire 44 Blue Productions alongside its American global entertainment & production content studio and parent The North Road Company alongside its international division North Road International their scripted & unscripted entertainment production subsidiary Chernin Entertainment, minority investment stakes in Omaha Productions and Two One Five Entertainment, Turkish/American drama production company Karga Seven Pictures, Mexican scripted television studio Perro Azul and its unscripted production operations which were Left/Right, Words + Pictures (including Little Room Films) and Kinetic Content from its founder Peter Chernin that would expand Mediawan's American production operations and the planned acquisition of North Road would lead Mediawan's entry into the Turkish and Latin American production operations.

== Productions ==
Title	Years	Network	Notes
A Place of Our Own	1998–2011	PBS	co-production with KCET
Family Court with Judge Penny	2008–2009	Syndication	co-production with Program Partners and Walnut Hill Media
Nightwatch	2015–2023	A&E	co-production with Wolf Entertainment
Jailbirds	2019	Netflix	
First Responders Live	2019	Fox	co-production with Wolf Entertainment
LA: Fire & Rescue	2021	NBC	co-production with Universal Television Alternative Studio and Wolf Entertainment
