= Mediawan =

French media conglomerate

Mediawan S.A.
- Type: Private
- ISIN: FR0013247137
- Industry: Entertainment
- Predecessor: AB Groupe; Makever Group; Lagardère Studios
- Founded: December 15, 2015; 10 years ago, in Paris, France
- Founders: Xavier Niel; Matthieu Pigasse; Pierre-Antoine Capton
- Headquarters: Paris, France
- Key people: Pierre Antoine-Capton (president); Orla Noonan (CEO)
- Revenue: $1.3 billion
- Divisions: Mediawan Africa; Mediawan Digital; Mediawan Finland; Mediawan Kids & Family; Mediawan Originals; Mediawan Pictures; Mediawan Podcast; Mediawan Rights; Mediawan Skyhigh; Mediawan Studios Spain; Mediawan Thematics; Mediawan US
- Subsidiaries: See § Assets
- Website: www.mediawan.com

Mediawan S.A. is a French media conglomerate and audiovisual international production & distribution group. It was founded on December 15, 2015, by Xavier Niel, Matthieu Pigasse and Pierre-Antoine Capton under the legal form of a special-purpose acquisition company ("SPAC") with the purpose to acquire assets and operations in the media production and distribution business in Europe. Their ambition for the company was to become "one of the largest platforms for European content".

== History ==
=== Founding, first acquisitions and expansions (2015–2020) ===
Mediawan was founded on December 15, 2015, as an acquisition service, with the company's plan was to form an audiovisual international group through acquisitions across France and Europe in the entertainment or media industries.

The company went public on April 22, 2016, raising €250 million ($310 million).

In January 2017, Mediawan announced that it had entered exclusive negotiations to acquire French audiovisual production, broadcasting and distribution company AB Groupe from its co-founder Claude Berda who had a 53% stake of the company alongside media company TF1 Group who owned a 33.5% stake, for €270 million in order for Mediawan to build a European premium content leader and an audiovisual production and distribution group. The deal could give Mediawan their own production companies and an international distribution division along with the pay-TV channels that AB Groupe owns. Two months later, Mediawan completed its acquisition of French audiovisual production, broadcasting & distribution company AB Groupe from its co-founder Claude Berda (who had a 53% stake of the latter group) alongside media company TF1 Group (who owned a 33.5% stake) as AB Groupe becoming a fully owned subsidiary of Mediawan, marking Mediawan's first step into the premium production and distribution activities.

In June 2017, Mediawan announced exclusive talks to acquire a majority stake in Paris-based French documentary production company Clarke Costelle & Co. (CC&C) One month later, Mediawan closed its acquisition of a majority stake in Paris-based French documentary audiovisual production company Clarke Costelle & Co (CC&C) with CC&C became a subsidiary of Mediawan. Also in the same month, they announced that they purchased the remaining 35% stake in Luxembourgish television channel RTL9 from its previous parent company RTL Group.

In December 2017, Mediawan announced they were in exclusive talks to acquiring a majority stake of Paris-based entertainment & animation production group ON Entertainment who owns live-action film production house Chapter 2 and its animation label Method Animation under the ON Kids & Family division alongside their feature film division ON Animation Studios, their post-production & CGI feature studio Onyx Lux and their Montreal-based feature animation production studio for about €50 million in order for them to enter the animation and feature film businesses. One year later in June 2018, Mediawan announced that they had completed their acquisition of a majority stake in ON Entertainment, the acquisition marked Mediawan's first entry into the animation market and gave Mediawan their own animation studio. Following its completion of Mediawan's acquisition of ON Entertainment, Mediawan restructured its operations into four groups and rebranded ON Entertainment as their children's subsidiary renamed to ON Kids & Family after ON's division with Chapter 2 moved into Mediawan's feature film production division.

In January 2018, Mediawan announced that it had acquired EuropaCorp's French television production division EuropaCorp Television (which was previously known as Cipango) and renamed the division into Storia Television expanding Mediawan's drama portfolio and becoming the biggest producer of television fiction content and expanded their international content. They also announced that they were in exclusive negotiations to buy a 60% majority stake in Paris-based French scripted production company Mon Voisin Productions and a majority stake in French television production group Makever along with their 7 independent production companies. Two months later, Mediawan announced that they had completed their acquisition of a majority stake in French scripted television production group Makever Group along with their production subsidiaries. Seven months later, Mediawan announced that they had completed their acquisition of a majority stake in French scripted production company Mon Voisin Productions. Later in that same month, Mediawan announced that they had entered a restructure by organising their operations into four audiovisual activities and had rebranded AB Groupe and their own international distribution arm AB International Distribution under the Mediawan name into Mediawan Thematics and Mediawan Rights, marking the first time Mediawan had rebranded their subsidiaries following their acquisition since 2017.

In December 2019, Mediawan announced that they had acquired a 50% stake in French film production company Mai Juin Productions and placing it under their content production division Mediawan Originals with the founder of Mai Juin Productions Gilles de Maistre joining Mediawan under their pool of talent.

In January 2019, Mediawan announced that they had entered a deal to acquire a 53% stake in Italian independent production outfit Palomar, the acquisition will be Mediawan's first acquisition outside of France. Two months later in March, Mediawan announced that they had completed their acquisition of a 53% majority stake in Italian independent production company Palomar, marking Mediawan's expansion into Italy with Mediawan will have plans to acquire a 75% stake later alongside founder and CEO of Palomar, Carlo Degli Esposti who continued having a 25% in the acquired company.

In April 2019, one year after Mediawan brought Paris-based production group ON Entertainment in June 2018, Mediawan alongside its children's subsidiary ON Kids & Family announced they've established a partnership with world-known French author and illustrator Joann Sfar to adapt his works into film and television with Mediawan and its subsidiary ON Kids & Family's acquisition of a majority stake in Joann Sfar's animation production company Nice Pictures, marking ON Kids & Family's first acquisition and placed it under the latter subsidiary and would undergo a major rebranding and a state of series and movies.

In May 2019, Mediawan announced that they had joined forces with French producer Noor Sadar and Belgian production company Entre Chien et Loups to launch a French production company dedicated to genre and low-budget films named Black Swan Tales.

In September 2019, Mediawan announced that they had launched their production label named NC Production with producer Nicole Collet joining Mediawan and their production label as their CEO of the production label.

In October 2019, Mediawan announced that there buying a majority stake in French film production company Radar Films in order for Mediawan to move into French and international series, expanding Mediawan's film production operations with Radar Films was placed under Mediawan's film production activities and will use their investment develop French and English-language films.

In February 2020, Mediawan announced that they had acquired a majority stake in Paris-based French premium documentary and scripted production company Black Dynamite, expanding Mediawan's documentary production activities.

In June 2020, following ON Kids & Family's acquisition of Joann Sfar's Paris-based production outfit Nice Pictures back in June 2019 and whilst during the online Annecy Animation Film Festival, Mediawan announced their children's subsidiary ON Kids & Family had rebranded its Paris-based production subsidiary Nice Pictures as their mini-studio, renaming it to Magical Society with Veteran animation producer, founder of Method Animation founder and ON Kids & Family co-founder Aton Soumache joining the rebranded production unit as renowned comic book artist & filmmaker Joann Sfar continued heading the rebranded production company with the release of its first movie based on Sfar's comic book series Little Vampire.

On 22 June 2020, Mediawan announced the creation of a dedicated pan-European company named Mediawan Alliance with Mediawan announcing that they had established an agreement to acquire a minority stake in German film & television production and distribution company Leonine Holding and announced that they had entered negotiations to buy French entertainment production and distribution company Lagardère Studios and their production subsidiaries including its distribution division from the Lagardère Group for €100 million that could further expand Mediawan's production portfolio and further expand Mediawan's international operations into other countries like Spain in order for Lagardère to focus on its publishing and travel retail operations. Mediawan also announced that they brought a majority stake in Spanish-based content production company Good Mood expanding their Spanish operations. Mediawan's division Mediawan Alliance announced that they were in exclusive negotiations to buy the French hip-hop group Troisième Œil's audiovisual activities. Five months later on November 2, Mediawan announced that they had completed their acquisition of French international production and distribution company Lagardère Studios and their production subsidiaries including its distribution division from the Lagardère Group along with their pan-European division Mediawan Alliance had completed their acquisition of the French hip-hop group Troisième Œil's audiovisual division and a minority stake in German audiovisual production and distribution company Leonine Holding, with the former being folded into Mediawan's expanded portfolio turning Mediawan into a pan-European entertainment production powerhouse. They also announced that they had taken a minority stake in Madrid-based Spanish production company Weekend Studio. One week later, following Mediawan completed their acquisition of Lagardère Studios, Mediawan announced that they were forming a Spanish production hub based in Spain named Mediawan Studios Spain with their three Spanish production companies being placed in that new division.

=== Major genre expansions, rebrandings and 10th anniversary (2021–present) ===
In March 2021, Mediawan launched its first owned SVOD service dedicated to documentaries called Explore, marking Mediawan's first entry into the French streaming service platform operations and their new documentary-focus streaming service will be exclusively via Apple TV.

In July 2021, Mediawan alongside German audiovisuel film & television production and distribution company Leonine Holding (whom Mediawan would acquire in 2024) had formally renamed their joint venture production division Mediawan Alliance as Mediawan & Leonine Studios and had announced it had jointly acquired a majority stake in British-based drama production company Drama Republic, marking the first time Mediawan had entered the British television market and the English-language operations alongside Leonine Holding with Drama Republic founders & CEOs Greg Brenman and Roanna Benn continued leading Drama Republic. Later in that same month following Mediawan's joint acquisition of British drama production studio Drama Republic with German film & television production company Leonine Studios via Mediawan & Leonine Studios, Mediawan announced their acquisition of a majority stake in Paris-based feature film production outfit Chi-Fou-Mi Productions in an effort to expand Mediawan's French film production business with Chi-Fou-Mi Productions being placed into Mediawan's division Mediawan Pictures.

In January 2022, Mediawan under their joint venture division Mediawan & Leonine Studios announced that they had opened up an American office based in Los Angeles, California and had hired former Red Arrow Studios and Fremantle executive Caroline Kusser to handle the joint venture division's own international co-productions as their executive VP.

In February 2022, Mediawan announced that they were restructuring their Finnish production subsidiary Aito Media and had hired media industry veteran Lauri Nurkse and TV professional Emilia Valentin who will take over development and distribution of Aito's scripted and unscripted programmes. Three months later in May, following Mediawan's restructuring of their Finnish production company Aito Media, Mediawan announced that they had rebranded their Finnish production company Aito Media which Mediawan acquired along with their parent Lagardére Studios back in 2020 as its Finnish production division through the Mediawan name and renamed it to Mediawan Finland, marking the first time that Mediawan had renamed one of their production companies after their parent company since their rebranded of its broadcasting division Mediawan Thematics and their distribution arm Mediawan Rights back in 2018.

In June 2022, one month after Mediawan rebranded Aito Media to Mediawan Finland, Mediawan renamed its children's subsidiary ON Kids & Family as their own division re-titled Mediawan Kids & Family, the rebranding had effectively retired the ON name after seven years & marked the second time Mediawan had renamed one of its subsidiaries after Mediawan Finland, with their animation labels Method Animation, Magical Society, ON Animation Studios and ON Classics being placed under the newly renamed division with the latter two retaining the ON name. Mediawan also announced that they had launched two new production labels which was traditional animation production studio Somewhere Animation and live-action studio Elliott Studio which would be part of the division, along with Mediawan Kids & Family launching their own distribution label called Mediawan Kids & Family Distribution which will handle all of their live action and animated programmes along with third-party programmes.

In September 2022, Mediawan announced that they were teaming up with Oscar-winning French film maker Florian Zeller to launch French-American film and television production company based in Paris and Los Angeles named Blue Morning Pictures with Mediawan financing and producing their film and television projects.

In October 2022, Mediawan announced that their international distribution division Mediawan Rights had entered the Web3 Space by launching their own metaverse dedicated for buyers to access Mediawan's catalog releases and connect with sales executives named Metawan.

On 30 October 2022, Mediawan announced that they were in exclusive talks to acquiring in a significant stake Brad Pitt's American film and television production studio Plan B Entertainment. Two months later in December 2022, Mediawan announced it had acquired a significant stake in Brad Pitt's Los Angeles-based American film and television production studio Plan B Entertainment and was placed under Mediawan's operations with Mediawan launching their dedicated US division named Mediawan US.

In February 2023, Mediawan announced that their children's division Mediawan Kids & Family had acquired a majority stake in Bristol-based British scripted and animation production company Wildseed Studios, making it Mediawan Kids & Family's first international acquisition with Wildseed Studios became a production label.

In April 2023, Mediawan announced that it had brought a majority stake in Amsterdam-based Dutch independent film & television production company and animation production studio Submarine, expanding Mediawan's animation and film & television production activities along with Mediawan's expanded Dutch production activities.

In May 2023, Mediawan announced that they had acquired Ivory Coast-based African independent audiovisual content production and distribution company Côte Ouest Audiovisuel and were placing it under their division Mediawan Africa expanding Mediawan's African operations with Mediawan's long-time partner Canal+ International continuing to hold a minority stake in Mediawan's acquired company Côte Ouest Audiovisuel.

In July 2023, Mediawan announced that they had acquired a majority stake in Paris-based French film production company 24 25 Films.

On 16 January 2024, Mediawan announced that they had brought a majority stake in London-based British documentary production company Misfits Entertainment, expanding Mediawan's factual production output and their English-language production activities.

In April 2024, Mediawan announced that they had rebranded their Dutch television production label Skyhigh TV which Mediawan eventually brought along with their acquisition of its parent Lagardère Studios back in 2020 under the Mediawan name and had it renamed to Mediawan Skyhigh in order to celebrate the latter's 25th anniversary, marking the third time that Mediawan had rebranded one of their production companies under the Mediawan name after Mediawan Finland and Mediawan Kids & Family. Later in that same month, Mediawan announced that they had entered an agreement with Munich-based German film and television production and distribution company Leonine Holding and had acquired the remaining stakes of the production company including their production divisions & subsidiaries (such as i&u TV and Toon2Tango) in an all stock deal for an undisclosed sum. The acquisition of the remaining stake in Leonine Holding had expanded Mediawan's operations into the German production & distribution operations & further expanded Mediawan's scripted, unscripted and kids & family activities, as Mediawan had turned into a pan-European film and television production and distribution powerhouse with approval from the German authorities whilst Leonine Studios retained their name and its production subsidiaries joined the Mediawan group as Leonine's founder Fred Kogel had joined Mediawan's executive team and continued heading Leonine's operations.

In May 2024, Mediawan announced that they along with independent animation studio ZAG which both previously produced Miraculous: Tales of Ladybug & Cat Noir under their brands Method Animation and Zagtoon had teamed up to launch a new joint venture production and IP holder label named Miraculous Corp. that will bring all of the components of the successful Miraculous franchise under one label with Mediawan holding a 60% stake in the new label placing it under their Mediawan Kids & Family division.

In August 2024, Mediawan announced that they had acquired a majority stake in Rome-based Italian film and television production company Our Films.

In September 2024, Mediawan announced that they had signed a global content production partnership with professional basketball player LeBron James and Maverick Carter's American entertainment production company SpringHill Company to produce and develop film and television series and adapt existing IP together along with explore international distribution opportunities starting with Weekend Warriors.

On 23 November 2024, Sky News reported that CVC Capital Partners, TF1, RedBird Capital Partners, All3Media, Mediawan and Kohlberg Kravis Roberts had been linked to a potential takeover bid for ITV plc and a possible break-up of core assets such as ITV Studios and ITVX.

In February 2025, Mediawan and their division Mediawan Kids & Family announced that they're shutting down their Montreal-based ON Animation Studios following the collapse of the entire Quebec animation industry ending the ON name entirely after 11 years with Mediawan's divisions Mediawan Kids & Family Cinema and their joint venture production company Miraculous Corp. taken over their animated film production activities in-house and will collaborate with partner studios around the world.

One month later,, Mediawan acquired a 51% majority stake in British/Australian Oscar-winning independent film and television production company See-Saw Films, expanding Mediawan's British production activities alongside the European production & distribution group's first entry into the Australian film & television market with See-Saw Films' founders and CEOs Iain Canning and Emile Sherman continued leading the acquired production company as Mediawan was preparing to celebrate their 10th anniversary.

Three months later, Mediawan announced the acquisition of Paris-based film & television production company led by comedian Jonathan Cohen and the studio behind the French adaptation of Ben Stiller-produced format Burning Love, Les Films Entre 2&4. Mediawan had previously produced the former's series through Mediawan's subsidiary MakingProd. The acquisition expanded Mediawan's in-house French production portfolio as Les Films Entre 2&4 became a subsidiary of Mediawan whilst continued to develop its own films and series whilst comedian Jonathan Cohen alongside fellow actors, screenwriters and producers Benjamin Bellecour and Jean-Toussaint Bernard had continued to lead the acquired Paris-based film & television production company.

Five months later, Mediawan expanded its British and American operations by teaming up with Margot Robbie's production portfolio LuckyChap Entertainment to establish the latter's film & television & international distribution arm as a joint venture entitled LuckyChap International with Mona Qureshi heading the joint-venture division.

In January 2026, Mediawan entered advanced talks to acquire The North Road Company and North Road International from Peter Chernin, including subsidiaries such as Chernin Entertainment, Karga Seven Pictures, Perro Azul, and unscripted labels Words + Pictures (Little Room Films), Kinetic Content, and 44 Blue Productions, as well as minority stakes in Omaha Productions. The deal aimed to expand Mediawan’s U.S. operations and mark its entry into Turkish and Latin American production markets.

On January 30, 2026, Mediawan confirmed the acquisition. North Road became Mediawan’s American production subsidiary alongside Chernin Entertainment. Peter Chernin joined Mediawan’s board and continued as North Road’s non-executive chairman.

On July 15, 2026, Banijay set up a bidding war to buy Lionsgate Studios along with Mediawan. Bolloré was thought to have also bid for the company, but confirmed that it hadn't as per earlier reports. On July 29, 2026, when Banijay dropped out of the bidding war, Mediawan became a winner of the bidding war and began to focus on acquiring Lionsgate Studios.

== Assets ==
Assets owned by Mediawan include:

Region/Country	Units
Africa	Côte Ouest Audiovisuel; Keewu Production
Australia	See-Saw Films (also in the United Kingdom; 51%); I Am That Productions (with Garth Davis); Picking Scabs (with Samantha Strauss)
Belgium	Black Swan Tales
Finland	Mediawan Finland
France	24 25 Films; 909 Productions; Alauda Films; Anthracite Productions; Atlantique Productions; Aubes Productions; Auteurs Associés; Black Dynamite; Black Dynamite Films; Black Wizard; Blue Morning Pictures (also in the United States); Cameron's; CC&C; Chapter 2; Chi-Fou-Mi Productions; Dana Productions; DEMD Productions; Ego Productions; Electron Libre; Fit Production; Georgia; GMT Productions; H2O Productions (6%); IdFictions; Image & Compagnie; Imagissime; Les Films Entre 2&4; Making Prod; Mai Juin Productions; Maximal Productions; Merlin Productions; Mon Voisin Productions; Moonbow; Mother Production (20%); Oberkampf Productions; Page 36; Païva Studio; Pink Lizard; Radar Films; Réservoir Prod; Scarlett Production; Septembre Productions; Storia Television; Story Nation Productions; Thematics Prod (formerly AB Productions); Troisième Œil Productions; Troisième Œil Story; White Lion Films
Germany	Beetz Brothers Filmproduktion; Hyperbole Medien; i&u Studios; Madame Zheng Productions; Odeon Fiction; Leonine Holding; SEO Entertainment; Wiedemann & Berg Film; W&B Television
Italy	Our Films; Palomar; Vision Distribution (joint venture with Sky Italia, Cattleya, Lucisano Media Group, Wildside and Indiana Production)
Netherlands	Mediawan Skyhigh; Submarine
Spain	Boomerang TV; Good Mood; Veranda; Weekend Studio
United Kingdom	Drama Republic; LuckyChap International (also in United States; with LuckyChap Entertainment); Misfits Entertainment; See-Saw Films (also in Australia; 51%); Cross City Films (international sales division); fanboy (with Patrick Walters)
United States	Blue Morning Pictures (also in France); Plan B Entertainment (60%); LuckyChap International (also in United Kingdom; with LuckyChap Entertainment); The North Road Company; Chernin Entertainment; Chernin Entertainment Television; Kinetic Content; Kinetic UK; 44 Blue Productions; Words + Pictures; Omaha Productions (with Peyton Manning); Two One Five Entertainment (with Questlove and Black Thought); North Road Television Studio
Latin America	Perro Azul (Mexico)
Turkey	Karga Seven Pictures
International	Leonine Distribution; A24/Leonine Studios (co-owned by A24); Leonine Licensing; Mediawan Digital; Mediawan Kids & Family; Mediawan Kids & Family Cinema; Mediawan Kids & Family Distribution; Mediawan Kids & Family Licensing; Magical Society; Magical Society UK; Magical North; Method Animation; Methonyx; Norman Studio; Onyx Lux; Somewhere Animation; Elliott Studio; Picture Box.; Palomar Animation; Wildseed Studios; Wildseed Movies; Submarine; Toon2Tango; Mediawan Podcast; Mediawan Rights; Miraculous Corp. (60%); The Awakening Production; Telmondis Distribution
Former/Defunct	Ango Productions; Carte Blanche Production; Europe Images; Frenchkiss Pictures; Hide Park Productions; IDDH; JPG Films; Lagardère Studios; LS Distribution (folded into Mediawan Rights); NC Production; ON Animation Studios; ON Animation Studios Montreal; Résolution; Save Ferris Studios; Studio Animage; Vema Production

=== Mediawan Finland ===
Mediawan Finland OY
- Formerly: Alto Media (2003–2022)
- Type: Division
- ISIN: FR0013247137
- Industry: Television
- Founder: Ilkka Hynninen; Eero Hietala
- Headquarters: Helsinki, Finland
- Key people: Jussi Lipponen (CEO & president)
- Parent: Content Media Corporation (2013–2017); Lagardère Studios (2017–2020); Mediawan (2020–)
- Website: www.mediawan.fi

Mediawan Finland (formerly known as Aito Media) is a Finnish television and film production division that is part of French media company Mediawan, specializing in producing entertainment content for Finnish television networks and international streaming services.

In October 2017, Aito Media was acquired by Lagardère's French production & distribution company Lagardère Studios from its previous British parent company Content Media Corporation, thrust expanded Largardère Studios's operations to the Finnish television production market for the first time with Alto Media Group's programming catalog now being distributed by Lagardère Studios' distribution arm.

=== Mediawan Rights ===
Mediawan Rights
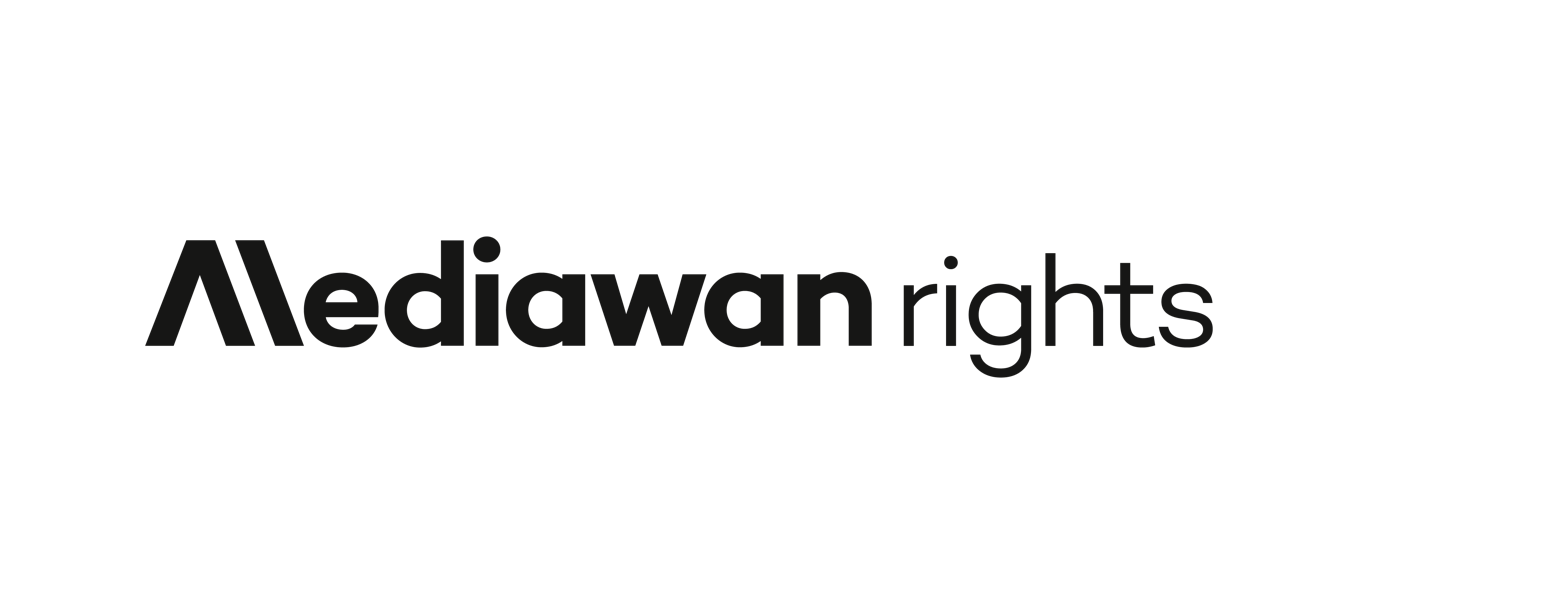
- Formerly: AB International Distribution (1977–2018)
- Type: Division
- ISIN: FR0013247137
- Industry: Distribution
- Predecessor: LS Distribution
- Founded: 1977; 49 years ago
- Founder: Claude Berda
- Key people: Valérie Vleeschhouwer (president)
- Parent: AB Groupe (1977–2017); Mediawan (2017–present)
- Website: rights.mediawan.com

Mediawan Rights (formerly known as AB International Distribution) is the distribution arm of Mediawan that handles distribution of all of its in-house programming catalogue including scripted & unscripted content alongside third-party productions worldwide. It was originally established in 1977 as the distribution division of AB Groupe before being sold to Mediawan in 2017.

In April 2021, Mediawan Rights who distributed Mediawan's in-house unscripted productions worldwide announced they've established a dedicated unscripted documentary distribution division with the new unscripted division signed an exclusive partnership deal with organization & production company Forbidden Stories to co-produce and distribute its programmes internationally.

In October 2022, Mediawan Rights expanded its unscripted division by opening to distribute third-party unscripted formats with the appointment of former Shine France executive and Jeremy Klif as deputy director of international sales at Mediawan Rights' unscripted division and would work alongside head unscripted distribution formats at Mediawan Rights' unscripted division Estelle Bodén.

=== Mediawan Skyhigh ===
Mediawan Skyhigh, formerly known as Skyhigh TV until April 2024 is a Dutch television production division of French production group Mediawan.

It was originally established under the name Skyhigh TV by Dutch television presenters Bert van Leeuwen, Marc Dik, producers Wilfred Drechsler and Bernard van den Bosch.

In March 2018, Skyhigh TV was acquired by Mediawan's predecessor & French production & distribution company Largadère Studios, the acquisition had given the former Lagardère Studios company and expansion into the Netherlands production genre and strengthen its international TV production; before being transferred to Mediawan two years later in November 2020.

By April 1, 2024, following Mediawan's acquisition of Dutch production company Skyhigh TV alongside former French production group Lagardère Studios back in November 2020 and on the year of Skyhigh's 25th anniversary, Mediawan rebranded its Dutch television production subsidiary Skyhigh TV as their own division, renaming it to Mediawan Skyhigh.
