= Celtics City =

2025 sports documentary miniseries

- Genre: Sports; Television documentary
- Showrunner: Gabe Honig
- Directed by: Lauren Stowell
- Country of origin: United States
- Original language: English
- No. of seasons: 1
- No. of episodes: 9

Production
- Executive producers: Bill Simmons; Connor Schell; Aaron Cohen; Libby Geist; Wyc Grousbeck; Rich Gotham
- Producers: Sascha Gardner; Christina Lenis; Jackie MacMullan
- Running time: 60 minutes
- Production companies: HBO Sports Documentaries; Ringer Films; Words + Pictures

Original release
- Network: HBO
- Release: March 3 – April 28, 2025

Celtics City is an American sports documentary miniseries produced by HBO. The series covers the history of the Boston Celtics from its first seasons to their record 18th NBA championship in the 2023–24 season. It was directed by Lauren Stowell and premiered on March 3, 2025.

== Synopsis ==
The series gives an extensive view of the team's history and cultural significance in Boston using unseen archival footage and interviews with current and former Celtics players.

== Production and release ==
The production of Celtics City was announced in November 2024, co-produced by HBO Sports Documentaries, Ringer Films, and Words + Pictures. Development for the documentary series began approximately four years prior to release. It was directed by Lauren Stowell, co-executive produced by Bill Simmons and Connor Schell, and features more than 80 interviews from players, coaches, and analysts, alongside archived game footage. Former Detroit Pistons point guard Isiah Thomas declined to be interviewed for the series due to his dislike of his portrayal in the Netflix documentary series The Last Dance. As part of production, cameras filmed the Celtics team during their 2023–24 championship season. In February 2025, HBO released the official trailer and announced that the nine-episode series would premiere on March 3, with a new episode airing each week.

== Episodes ==
Episodes of Celtics City
No.	Title	Directed by	Original release date
1	"Chapter I: Founding Fathers"	Lauren Stowell	March 3, 2025
2	"Chapter II: No Final Victories"	Lauren Stowell	March 10, 2025
3	"Chapter III: All Swept Up"	Lauren Stowell	March 17, 2025
4	"Chapter IV: Great Hope, Period"	Lauren Stowell	March 24, 2025
5	"Chapter V: F**k The Celtics"	Lauren Stowell	March 31, 2025
6	"Chapter VI: Untenable Toll"	Lauren Stowell	April 7, 2025
7	"Chapter VII: Not Again"	Lauren Stowell	April 14, 2025
8	"Chapter VIII: Ubuntu"	Lauren Stowell	April 21, 2025
9	"Chapter IX: We’re The Celtics"	Lauren Stowell	April 28, 2025

== Reception ==
On review aggregator website Rotten Tomatoes, Celtics City has an approval rating of 100% based on 7 critic reviews, with an average rating of 8 out of 10.

== See also ==
- Winning Time: The Rise of the Lakers Dynasty
