= Words + Pictures =

American film production studio

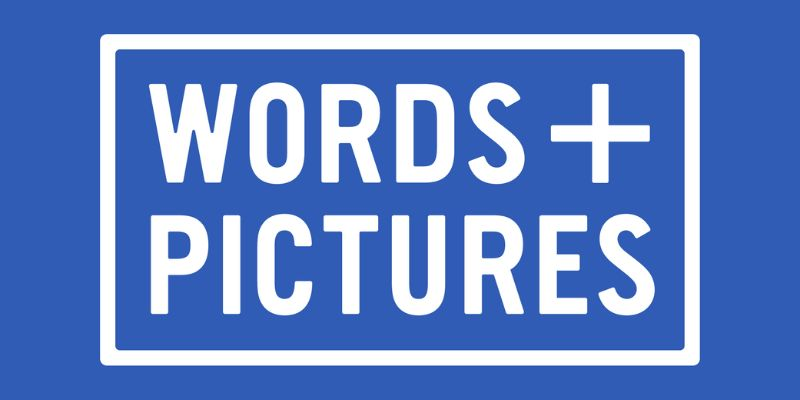
- Type: Production studio
- Industry: Film and television
- Founder: Connor Schell and Chernin Entertainment
- Headquarters: New York City
- Parent: The North Road Company
- Website: wordsandpictures.com; fulldayprod.com

Words + Pictures is a production studio founded by Connor Schell and Chernin Entertainment in 2021.

Connor Schell, former ESPN content chief, is the CEO of Words + Pictures. Libby Geist was promoted to President of the company in 2024 from her former role as EVP and head of documentaries. Aaron Cohen, promoted from his previous position of EVP of Development at the same time as Geist, serves as Chief Creative Officer (CCO). In 2021, Words + Pictures launched Full Day, a new production branch under the leadership of President and Executive Producer Dave Chamberlin, to focus on live entertainment, specials, and unscripted series.

In July 2022, it was announced that Chernin Entertainment's president & founder Peter Chernin announced that he established a global independent and production content studio named The North Road Company that would bring Words + Pictures together with fellow scripted film & television production studio Chernin Entertainment becoming part of his new company while the new studio The North Road Company had brought the remaining 50% stake in unscripted documentary production company Words + Pictures and also acquired the U.S. assets of German entertainment & international distribution company Red Arrow Studios from ProSiebenSat.1 Media (which were Kinetic Content, Left/Right and 44 Blue Productions) with Peter Chernin became CEO & chairman of the new company with Chernin Entertainment veteran Jenno Topping retained his role president of The North Road Company's division Chernin Entertainment and started overseeing The North Road Company's scripted film and television operations alongside Words + Pictures founder Connor Schell who had continued running the unscripted production company under North Road and would assume The North Road Company's unscripted operations as head of unscripted while Providence Equity Partners, Apollo, and QIA continued holding investment in Words + Pictures via North Road. The new global content studio had also established its international division named North Road International as Jan Frouman (who joined Words + Pictures' fellow subsidiary Chernin Entertainment three months prior back in April of that year) became The North Road Company's president as former AMC Networks executive Kirstin Jones joined The North Road Company and became the global studio's president of international film & television and the two would run North Road's new international division with their international office being based in London, England.

Words + Pictures acquired Hock Films, founded by Peabody and Emmy Award-winning director and producer Jonathan Hock, in 2022, as well as Little Room Films, founded by Jason Hehir (director of The Last Dance), in 2023.

Words + Pictures is currently partnered with NASCAR's Full Speed Entertainment, Peyton Manning's Omaha Productions, and Questlove and Black Thought's Two One Five.

Words + Pictures is based in SoHo in New York City.

In January 2026, French media entertainment company Mediawan had entered advanced talks to acquire Words + Pictures including its subsidiary Little Room Films alongside its American global entertainment & production content studio and parent The North Road Company alongside its international division North Road International their scripted & unscripted entertainment production subsidiary Chernin Entertainment, minority investment stakes in Omaha Productions and Two One Five Entertainment, Turkish/American drama production company Karga Seven Pictures, Mexican scripted television studio Perro Azul and its unscripted production operations which were Left/Right, Kinetic Content and 44 Blue Productions from its founder Peter Chernin that would expand Mediawan's American production operations and the planned acquisition of North Road would lead Mediawan's entry into the Turkish and Latin American production operations.

== Filmography ==
Words + Pictures has distributed its media across platforms like ESPN, ESPN+, Apple TV+, Max, Hulu, Prime Video, and Netflix.

=== Film ===
==== Super/Man: The Christopher Reeve Story ====
In co-production with Misfits Entertainment and Passion Pictures, Words + Pictures financed and produced the feature-length documentary Super/Man: The Christopher Reeve Story (2024). The documentary follows the life and legacy of actor, activist, director, and author Christopher Reeve.

Super/Man premiered at Sundance Film Festival in 2023 and was acquired by Warner Bros. Discovery for distribution across Warner Bros. Pictures, DC Studios, HBO Documentary Films, CNN Films, and the streaming service Max. The documentary sold for roughly $15 million. In November 2024, it won six Critics' Choice Awards, including Best Documentary Feature.

==== Countdown: Inspiration4 Mission to Space ====
Directed by Jason Hehir, Countdown: Inspiration4 Mission to Space (2021) tracks Inspiration4, the SpaceX Dragon mission that launched four civilians into space. The film was produced by TIME Studios in association with Words + Pictures.

==== Giannis: The Marvelous Journey ====
Giannis: The Marvelous Journey is a 2024 documentary following Giannis Antetokounmpo's journey towards playing in the NBA, covering the struggles he and his family faced as Nigerian immigrants in Greece. The documentary was directed by Kristen Lappas and produced by Words + Pictures. It streams on Amazon's Prime Video.

==== Open Heart ====
Open Heart is a documentary feature film following New York Rangers goalie Henrik Lundqvist and his struggle to return to hockey after heart surgery. The film was produced by Words + Pictures, directed by Jonathan Hock, and premiered at the 2023 Tribeca Film Festival as a Spotlight Documentary.

==== The Lionheart ====
The Lionheart is a 2023 documentary film produced by Words + Pictures, Stardust Frames, XTR, and TIME Studios. The film covers the IndyCar crash that killed Dan Wheldon, two-time Indy 500 Champion, alongside the subsequent racing careers of Wheldon's sons Sebastian and Oliver. It was acquired by HBO Sports Documentaries and premiered at the 2023 Tribeca Film Festival.

==== Ayenda ====
Ayenda is a 2023 documentary short film that tracks the evacuation of members of the Under-18 Afghan Women's Football Team after Kabul fell to the Taliban. It was produced by MSNBC Films, TIME Studios, and Words + Pictures. Marie Margolius directed the film.

==== Jeen-yuhs: A Kanye Trilogy ====
Directed by Coodie Simmons and Chike Ozah, Jeen-yuhs: A Kanye Trilogy (2022) is a documentary trilogy that charts the career of musical artist Kanye West over two decades. The series was produced with creative control by Words + Pictures, with Connor Schell as Executive Producer, in partnership with TIME Studios. It streams on Netflix.

==== 30 for 30 ====
===== "Dude Perfect: A Very Long Shot" =====
"Dude Perfect: A Very Long Shot" is season 4 episode 19 of ESPN's 30 for 30 series. Directed by Oliver Anderson and Louis Burgdorf, the documentary follows a group of college friends who turned filming YouTube videos of trick shots into a cultural and sports-comedy phenomenon. It was produced by ESPN Films in association with Words + Pictures and premiered August 2024.

===== "American Son" =====
"American Son" is an episode of 30 for 30 produced by ESPN Films and Words + Pictures. Directed by Emmy-nominated correspondent Jay Caspian Kang, "American Son" reflects on Michael Chang's improbable rise to tennis stardom and his family's immigrant journey. The story is centered around 17-year-old Chang's upset of top-ranked Ivan Lendl at the 1989 French Open, a match that unfolded shortly after the Tiananmen Square massacre in China. The episode came out in July 2024.

===== "No Scope: The Story of FaZe Clan" =====
"No Scope: The Story of FaZe Clan" follows the rise and fall of influential esports team FaZe Clan. The episode was directed by Justin Staple, produced by ESPN Films and Words + Pictures, and premiered in June 2024.

===== "Jeanette Lee Vs." =====
Directed by Ursula Liang, "Jeanette Lee Vs." chronicles the story of Jeanette Lee, the Black Widow, one of the most infamous billiards players of all time. The episode was produced by ESPN Films in association with Words + Pictures and aired in December 2022.

===== "Shark" =====
Directed by Jason Hehir and Thomas Odelfelt, "Shark" follows golfer Greg Norman as he looks back on his career and how it was shaped by one fateful day at the Masters in 1996. The film was produced by ESPN Films in association with Words + Pictures. "Shark" premiered in April 2022.

All 30 for 30 episodes are distributed by ESPN and stream on ESPN/ESPN+.

===== "Kate Spade documentary" =====
This documentary on Kate Spade is in production as of November 2025 and will be directed by Spade's niece Rachel Brosnahan in her directorial debut.

=== Television ===
Title	Years	Network	Notes
Super League: The War for Football	2023	Apple TV+	co-production with All Rise Films; It won two Sports Emmy Awards in May 2024: Outstanding Documentary Series and Outstanding Graphic Design - Specialty.
NASCAR: Full Speed	2024–present	Netflix	co-production with NASCAR Studios and Full Speed Entertainment (season 2–)
Full Court Press	2024–2025	ESPN+	co-production with ESPN and Omaha Productions
Game 7	2024	Amazon Prime Video	co-production with Amazon MGM Studios and Jersey Films 2nd Avenue
Court of Gold	2025	Netflix	co-production with Higher Ground Productions and Olympic Channel
Celtics City	2025	HBO	co-production with HBO Sports Documentaries and Ringer Films
The Kingdom	2025	ESPN	co-production with Skydance Sports, NFL Films, 2PM Productions and Foolish Club Studios

==== For the Win: NWSL ====
For the Win: NWSL is a docuseries tracking the 2024 National Women's Soccer League (NWSL) playoffs and Championship. The four-part series was produced by Words + Pictures and began streaming on Amazon Prime Video in March 2025.

==== The Fight Life ====
The Fight Life is an upcoming docuseries that chronicles a year in the lives of five Top Rank Boxing stars: Tyson Fury, Naoya Inoue, Seniesa Estrada, Teofimo Lopez, and Josh Taylor. The Fight Life premiered October 7 on ESPN+ and aired on ESPN2 following its streaming run. ESPN produces the series with Words + Pictures and Top Rank.

==== Murder in Boston: Roots, Rampage, and Reckoning ====
Murder in Boston: Roots, Rampage, and Reckoning is a three-episode 2023 docuseries that examines the murder of Carol Stuart, the ensuing police investigation, and the resulting sociopolitical tensions. The series was directed by Jason Hehir and produced by Little Room Films.

==== Under Pressure: The U.S. Women's World Cup Team ====
Under Pressure: The U.S. Women's World Cup Team is a 2023 documentary miniseries that follows the U.S. Women's soccer team as they pursue their third consecutive World Cup. The series was produced by Words + Pictures in collaboration with Time and streams on Netflix.

==== Sue's Places ====
Sue's Places is a 2024 ESPN television program produced by Omaha Productions in collaboration with Words + Pictures. The series follows former UConn basketball star Sue Bird as she explores places rich in the traditions of college basketball.

==== The King of Collectibles ====
The King of Collectibles follows sports card collector Ken Goldin and his team as they manage an auction house specializing in collectibles. The series was produced by Words + Pictures in collaboration with Omaha Productions. Season one premiered on Netflix in April 2023, and season two was released in June 2024.

==== Algiers, America: The Relentless Pursuit ====
Directed by Jackson Fager (VICE News, HBO's Fighting ISIS), this five-part documentary tells the story of a successful high school football program in a community struggling with urban blight. Algiers, America was produced by Words + Pictures, Fager Films, and Andscape; it premiered on Hulu in April 2023.

==== The Yankees Win (upcoming) ====
In February 2023, it was announced that Words + Pictures, Hock Films, Bad Robot, and Zipper Bros Films are partnering with Major League Baseball to produce an eight-part documentary series about the New York Yankees. The series is being directed by Jonathan Hock.

== Full Day ==
Full Day, the live production label of Words + Pictures, is led by President and Executive Producer Dave Chamberlin. Chamberlin is an Emmy Award-winning producer. Full Day creates live events such as the Oscars Red Carpet Show, the Emmys Red Carpet Show, NFL Honors, the ESPYS, Netflix Slam, the Netflix Cup, and the Savage X Fenty shows.

== Awards ==
Year	Project	Awarding Body	Award	Result	Ref.
2024	Super/Man: The Christopher Reeve Story	Critics Choice Association	Best Documentary Feature	Won	
2024	Super/Man: The Christopher Reeve Story	Critics Choice Association	Best Director	Won	
2024	Super/Man: The Christopher Reeve Story	Critics Choice Association	Best Editing	Won	
2024	Super/Man: The Christopher Reeve Story	Critics Choice Association	Best Score	Won	
2024	Super/Man: The Christopher Reeve Story	Critics Choice Association	Best Archival Documentary	Won	
2024	Super/Man: The Christopher Reeve Story	Critics Choice Association	Best Biographical Documentary	Won	
2024	Super/Man: The Christopher Reeve Story	Producers Guild Awards	Outstanding Producer of Documentary Motion Pictures	Won	
2024	Super/Man: The Christopher Reeve Story	British Academy Film Awards (BAFTA)	Best Documentary	Won	
2024	Super League: The War for Football	National Academy of Television Arts and Sciences (Emmy Awards)	Outstanding Documentary Series - Serialized	Won	
2024	Super League: The War for Football	National Academy of Television Arts and Sciences (Emmy Awards)	Outstanding Graphic Design	Won	
2024	King of Collectibles: The Goldin Touch	National Academy of Television Arts and Sciences (Emmy Awards)	Outstanding Arts and Popular Culture Program	Nominated	
2024	Murder in Boston: Roots, Rampage, and Reckoning	National Academy of Television Arts and Sciences (Emmy Awards)	Outstanding Crime and Justice Documentary	Won	
2024	Murder in Boston: Roots, Rampage, and Reckoning	National Academy of Television Arts and Sciences (Emmy Awards)	Best Documentary	Nominated	
2024	Murder in Boston: Roots, Rampage, and Reckoning	National Academy of Television Arts and Sciences (Emmy Awards)	Outstanding Editing: Documentary	Nominated	
2024	Murder in Boston: Roots, Rampage, and Reckoning	Peabody Awards	84th Annual Peabody Awards	Nominated	
2024	Murder in Boston: Roots, Rampage, and Reckoning	Gotham Awards	Breakthrough Nonfiction Series	Nominated	
2024	Algiers, America: The Relentless Pursuit	International Documentary Association	Best Multi-Part Documentary	Nominated	
2023	The Lionheart	Tribeca Film Festival	Best Documentary Feature	Nominated	
2023	The Lionheart	Heartland International Film Festival	Audience Choice Award	Won	
2023	Ayenda	Doc NYC	Directing Award, Shorts	Won	
2023	Ayenda	Venice Fullshot Film Festival	Jury Prize, Best Documentary Short	Won	
2023	Jeen-Yuhs: A Kanye Trilogy	Cinema Eye Honors	Outstanding Broadcast Cinematography	Nominated	
2022	Jeen-Yuhs: A Kanye Trilogy	National Academy of Television Arts and Sciences (Emmy Awards)	Outstanding Documentary or Non-Fiction Series	Nominated	
2022	Jeen-Yuhs: A Kanye Trilogy	Hollywood Critics Association	Best Streaming Docuseries or Non-Fiction Series	Nominated	
2022	Jeen-Yuhs: A Kanye Trilogy	MTV Movie and TV Awards	Best Music Documentary	Nominated	
