= Nightwatch (TV series) =

American reality television series

- Genre: Reality television
- Created by: Dick Wolf
- Country of origin: United States
- Original language: English
- No. of seasons: 7

Production
- Executive producers: Dick Wolf; Tom Thayer; Rasha Drachkovitch; Shelly Tatro; Drew Tappon; Lily Neumeyer; Devon Graham; Devon Hammonds; Robyn Younie; Elaine Frontain Bryant; Peter Tarshis
- Production companies: 44 Blue Productions; Wolf Films

Original release
- Network: A&E
- Release: January 22, 2015 – October 7, 2023

Related
- Nightwatch Nation

Nightwatch is an American reality television series broadcast by A&E. The show follows the night-shift emergency service workers of a specific city as they perform their duties. The series is filmed in New Orleans, except for Season 4, which was filmed in Tampa.

== List of episodes ==
=== Season 1 (2015) ===
No. overall	No. in season	Title	Original release date
1	1	"Retaliation"	January 22, 2015
2	2	"Those We Rely On"	January 29, 2015
3	3	"Officer Down"	February 5, 2015
4	4	"The Darkest Shift on the Scariest Night"	February 12, 2015
5	5	"Their Worst Day"	February 19, 2015
6	6	"Full Moon Rising"	February 26, 2015
7	7	"100%, Every Time"	March 5, 2015
8	8	"Caught You, By Surprise"	March 12, 2015
9	9	"When Work Becomes Family"	March 19, 2015

=== Season 2 (2015–16) ===
No. overall	No. in season	Title	Original release date
10	1	"Mardi Gras"	November 5, 2015
11	2	"In the Blink of an Eye"	November 12, 2015
12	3	"Trust the Ones You're With"	November 19, 2015
13	4	"Fallen Brother"	December 3, 2015
14	5	"Guardians of the City"	December 3, 2015
15	6	"United We Stand"	December 17, 2015
16	7	"Triumph & Tragedy"	January 7, 2016
17	8	"Dark Side of the City"	January 14, 2016
18	9	"Dreams and Nightmares"	January 21, 2016
19	10	"Saints and Sinners"	January 28, 2016
20	11	"Katrina"	February 4, 2016
21	12	"Nightwatch: Memorable Cases and Chases"	February 11, 2016

=== Season 3 (2016–17) ===
No. overall	No. in season	Title	Original release date
22	1	"New Beginnings"	December 1, 2016
23	2	"Pride"	December 8, 2016
24	3	"The Ties That Bind"	December 15, 2016
25	4	"We Give Thanks"	December 22, 2016
26	5	"Heroes Among Us"	December 29, 2016
27	6	"Southern Comfort"	January 5, 2017
28	7	"105 and Rising"	January 12, 2017
29	8	"Stranger Things"	January 19, 2017
30	9	"Brotherhood"	January 26, 2017
31	10	"The End is Just the Beginning"	February 2, 2017

=== Season 4 (2017) ===
Note: Episodes 1, 3, and 5 are officially recognized by A&E as episodes of Season 4, though they follow the New Orleans crew instead of the Tampa crew, and are promoted by some unofficial sources as part of Season 3.

No. overall	No. in season	Title	Original release date
32	1	"Nightwatch: Behind the Badge"	February 9, 2017
33	2	"Life on the Line"	February 9, 2017
34	3	"EMTs Bare All: Part 1"	February 16, 2017
35	4	"Family Ties"	February 16, 2017
36	5	"EMTs Bare All: Part 2"	February 23, 2017
37	6	"Needle in a Haystack"	February 23, 2017
38	7	"Dumb Luck"	March 2, 2017
39	8	"Animal Instinct"	March 9, 2017
40	9	"Always Remain Calm"	March 23, 2017
41	10	"Freak Show"	March 30, 2017
42	11	"Teenage Wasteland"	April 6, 2017
43	12	"Tough Love"	April 13, 2017
44	13	"Thin Blue Line"	April 20, 2017

=== Season 5 (2021) ===
Season 5 also includes the one-hour specials "Return to the Big Easy", which aired on March 18, 2021, and "City of Saints", which aired on April 29, 2021.

No. overall	No. in season	Title	Original release date
45	1	"Answering the Call"	March 25, 2021
46	2	"Night Lessons"	April 1, 2021
47	3	"The Great Unknown"	April 8, 2021
48	4	"A Light in the Darkness"	April 15, 2021
49	5	"Heartbeat of the City"	April 22, 2021
50	6	"Circle of Life"	May 6, 2021
51	7	"The Fire Within"	May 13, 2021
52	8	"Heart and Soul"	May 20, 2021
53	9	"Cold Hands, Warm Hearts"	May 27, 2021
54	10	"The Big Not-So-Easy"	June 3, 2021
55	11	"Keep Calm and Carry On"	June 10, 2021
56	12	"Drama Calls"	June 17, 2021

=== Season 6 (2022) ===
No. overall	No. in season	Title	Original release date
57	1	"Yardi Gras"	March 10, 2022
58	2	"Man's Best Friend"	March 17, 2022
59	3	"Have Mercy"	March 24, 2022
60	4	"In Sync"	March 24, 2022
61	5	"A Walk on the Wild Side"	April 7, 2022
62	6	"Every Breath You Take"	April 14, 2022
63	7	"Lifeline"	April 21, 2022
64	8	"Saturday Night Fever Dream"	April 28, 2022
65	9	"Why We Serve"	May 5, 2022

== Release ==
In 2021, the series was released on the streaming service Discovery+. Season 1 was also released on Hulu.

== Reception ==
Nightwatch was given a rating of 3/5 stars by Common Sense Media. The series has been widely praised by emergency service people and organizations for its authenticity.

The series has been the subject of controversy with regards to patient privacy. There have also been concerns about the cities featured in the show being portrayed negatively.

== Related series ==
The series was followed by Nightwatch Nation, a one-season series with the same premise, but which focuses on a different city in each episode, and only focuses on emergency medical technicians (whereas the main series focuses on police and firefighters as well). Nightwatch Nation aired in between seasons 4 and 5 of Nightwatch, and is sometimes promoted as a season of the main series.
