= Dick Wolf =

American television producer (born 1946)

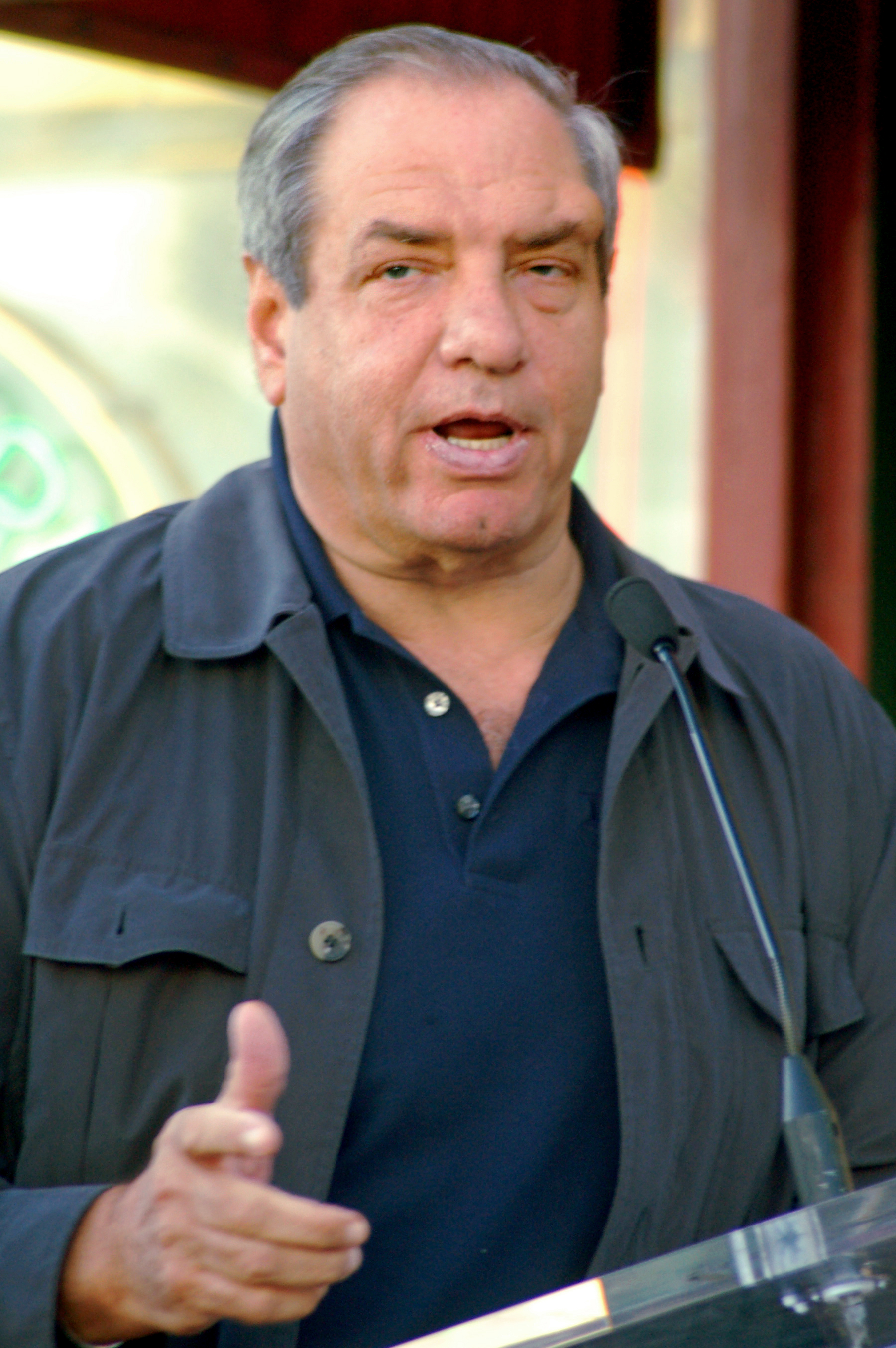
- Wolf in 2010
- Born: Richard Anthony Wolf; December 20, 1946 (age 79); New York City, U.S.
- Other name: Richard D. Wolf
- Education: University of Pennsylvania (BA)
- Occupations: Television writer, director, executive producer, creator
- Employer: Wolf Entertainment
- Known for: Law & Order franchise; Chicago franchise; FBI franchise
- Spouses: Susan Scranton (m. 1970; div. 1983); Christine Marburg (m. 1983; div. 2005); Noelle Lippman (m. 2006; div. 2019)
- Children: 5

Richard Anthony Wolf (born December 20, 1946) is an American television producer best known for his Law & Order franchise. Since 1990, the franchise has included six police/courtroom dramas and four international spin-offs. He is also the co-creator and executive producer of the Chicago franchise and the co-creator and executive producer of the FBI franchise.

Wolf has also written four books. The first, the non-fiction volume Law & Order: Crime Scenes, is a companion to the Law & Order television series. The Intercept, The Execution, and The Ultimatum are works of fiction in a thriller series featuring an NYPD detective named Jeremy Fisk.

Wolf has won two Emmy Awards, has been inducted into the Television Academy Hall of Fame, and has received a star on the Hollywood Walk of Fame.

== Early life and education ==
Wolf was born in Manhattan to a Jewish father and a Catholic mother of Irish descent. His father, George Wolf, was a writer, director, and producer. As a boy, he was an altar server at the local Catholic parish.

Wolf attended Saint David's School, The Gunnery, and Phillips Academy, Andover. He subsequently attended the University of Pennsylvania (class of 1969), where he was a member of the Zeta Psi fraternity.

== Career ==
=== Advertising ===
Wolf worked as an advertising copywriter at Benton & Bowles creating commercials for Crest toothpaste, including the slogan "You can't beat Crest for fighting cavities." He is also credited with the campaign "I'm Cheryl, fly me" for National Airlines. Despite his success in copywriting, he was writing screenplays in the hopes of a film career. It was at this time that he briefly collaborated on a screenplay with Oliver Stone, who was a struggling screenwriter at the time.

=== Initial screenwriting success ===
He moved to Los Angeles after a few years and had three screenplays produced; one of these films, Masquerade (1988), featuring Rob Lowe and Meg Tilly, gained notable acclaim. He started his television career as a staff writer on Hill Street Blues and was nominated for his first Emmy Award for the episode "What Are Friends For?", on which he was the only writer. While working on Hill Street Blues, Wolf became close friends with Tom Fontana, then writing for the series St. Elsewhere, produced in the same building, at the same time. Wolf moved from Hill Street Blues to Miami Vice, where he was a writer and co-producer for the third and fourth seasons.

=== Law & Order franchise ===
Wolf's original series Law & Order ran from 1990 to 2010, and was revived in 2022. It has surpassed Gunsmoke as longest-running dramatic show in American television history, making it one of television's most successful franchises. It has been nominated for the most consecutive Emmy Awards of any primetime drama series. Wolf serves as creator and executive producer of the current Law & Order drama series from Wolf Entertainment and NBCUniversal Television – Law & Order: Special Victims Unit (which, as of September 5, 2024, is the longest-running scripted primetime drama, having aired 551 episodes, breaking the original Law & Order count of 456 (now 501 through the twenty-third season), and beating both the original Law & Order and Gunsmoke in number of seasons).

Wolf also was creator and executive producer for five spinoff shows in the franchise – Law & Order: Criminal Intent, Law & Order: Trial by Jury, Law & Order: LA, Law & Order: Organized Crime, and Conviction. Many of Wolf's series have intersected with the Law & Order franchise in some fashion, and the Law & Order series have been adapted into several foreign versions. He was also the creator and executive producer of NBC's courtroom reality series Crime & Punishment, which chronicled real-life cases prosecuted by the San Diego District Attorney's office.

=== Chicago franchise ===
Wolf developed Chicago Fire, a drama about a group of men and women working at the Chicago Fire Department. The series was picked up by NBC in May 2012, and premiered on October 10, 2012, with meek numbers in the ratings and minimal reviews in the first few weeks before spiking to NBC's #2 scripted drama series, under Revolution. In March 2013, NBC announced intentions for a spin-off of Chicago Fire revolving around the Chicago Police Department. When that series Chicago P.D. premiered, Derek Haas, Michael W. Brandt, and Matt Olmstead became executive producers, under Wolf. Two subsequent shows, Chicago Med which premiered in 2015, and Chicago Justice whose one season began and ended in 2017, followed in Chicago P.D.'s wake.

=== FBI franchise ===
In 2018, Wolf became executive producer of the CBS drama FBI, starring Law & Order cast members Jeremy Sisto and Alana de la Garza and also Sela Ward. FBI has since had three spinoffs (FBI: Most Wanted, FBI: International and CIA), giving Wolf his third franchise.

Beginning in the 2021–2022 TV season, all three of Wolf's franchises have their own night of programming: FBI Tuesdays on CBS (original series, Most Wanted, International), Chicago Wednesdays on NBC (Med, Fire, P.D.), and Law & Order Thursdays on NBC (original series revival, SVU and Organized Crime).

=== Other work ===
Wolf had a miniseries that was in pre-production in September 2001, under the name Terror, when the September 11th attacks took place. The show was soon "scrapped."

In 2012, Wolf developed the unscripted show Cold Justice, a documentary drama, for TNT. He also has written three novels whose central character is NYPD Detective Jeremy Fisk: The Intercept, The Execution, and The Ultimatum. In 2024, Wolf released a documentary miniseries with Netflix called Homicide: New York.

In May 2021, NBC ordered a docuseries LA Fire and Rescue. The series followed the firefighters of the Los Angeles County Fire Department and was executive produced by Wolf. The series was cancelled by NBC after one season.

=== Art collecting ===
In December 2023, the Metropolitan Museum of Art announced the promised gift of over 200 works of art from Wolf, including Old Master paintings, sculptures and drawings, as well as funds to endow two galleries with his name. Wolf reported that his appreciation for art started when he was a child visiting Met on his way home from school.

== Honors ==
Wolf's personal honors include the Award of Excellence from the Banff Television Festival, the 2002 Creative Achievement Award from NATPE; the Anti-Defamation League's Distinguished Entertainment Industry Award, the Leadership and Inspiration Award from the Entertainment Industries Council, the Governor's Award by the New York Chapter of the National Academy of Television Arts and Sciences, the 1997 achievement award from the Caucus for Producers, Writers, and Directors, the 1998 Television Showman of the Year Award from the Publicists Guild of America, the 2002 Tribute from the Museum of Television and Radio, and a 2003 Special Edgar Award from the Mystery Writers of America.

On March 29, 2007, Wolf received a star on the Hollywood Walk of Fame at 7040 Hollywood Boulevard. In 2013, Wolf was inducted into the Television Academy Hall of Fame. Wolf is also an Honorary Consul general of Monaco and is actively involved in the principality's prestigious annual Television Festival.

== Political involvement ==
It was reported that Wolf contributed to Fred Thompson's campaign for the Republican nomination for president in 2008. The two had worked together since 2002, when Thompson joined the cast of Law & Order playing a district attorney.

== In popular culture ==
Community, a sitcom on NBC from 2009 to 2014, had an episode which parodied Dick Wolf's Law & Order, with the title "Basic Lupine Urology" being a play on his name. Wolf is given a special thanks credit at the end of the episode of the series.

== Filmography ==
=== Film ===
- Skateboard (1978) (writer)
- No Man's Land (1987) (writer)
- Masquerade (1988) (writer)
- School Ties (1992) (writer)
- Twin Towers (2003) (producer)
- Bury My Heart at Wounded Knee (2007) (executive producer)
- Naked Singularity (2021) (executive producer)

=== Television ===
==== Scripted ====
Year	Title	Creator	Executive Producer	Writer	Network
1985–1986	Hill Street Blues	No	No	Yes	NBC
1986–1988	Miami Vice	No	Co-executive	Yes	NBC
1989	Gideon Oliver	Yes	Yes	No	ABC
1989	Christine Cromwell	Yes	Yes	No	ABC
1990	Nasty Boys	Yes	Yes	No	NBC
1990	H.E.L.P.	Yes	Yes	No	ABC
1990–2010, 2022–present	Law & Order	Yes	Yes	Yes	NBC
1992	Mann & Machine	Yes	Yes	Yes	NBC
1992	The Human Factor	No	Yes	No	CBS
1993	South Beach	Yes	Yes	Yes	NBC
1993	Crime & Punishment	Yes	Co-executive	Yes	NBC
1994–1999	New York Undercover	Yes	Yes	Yes	Fox
1995	The Wright Verdicts	Yes	Yes	No	CBS
1996	Swift Justice	Yes	Yes	No	UPN
1997	Feds	Yes	Yes	No	CBS
1997–1998	Players	Yes	Yes	No	NBC
1998	Exiled: A Law & Order Movie	Yes	Yes	No	NBC
1998	The Invisible Man	No	Yes	No	N/A
1999–present	Law & Order: Special Victims Unit	Yes	Yes	Yes	NBC
2000	D.C.	No	Yes	No	The WB
2000	Arrest & Trial	Yes	Yes	No	Syndication
2000–2001	Deadline	Yes	Yes	Yes	NBC
2001–2011	Law & Order: Criminal Intent	Yes	Yes	Yes	NBC/USA Network
2003	L.A. Dragnet	Yes	Yes	No	ABC
2005–2006	Law & Order: Trial by Jury	Yes	Yes	Yes	NBC
2006	Conviction	Yes	Yes	No	NBC
2009–2014	Law & Order: UK	Yes	Yes	No	ITV
2010–2011	Law & Order: LA	Yes	Yes	Yes	NBC
2012–present	Chicago Fire	No	Yes	Yes	NBC
2014–present	Chicago P.D.	Yes	Yes	Yes	NBC
2015–present	Chicago Med	Yes	Yes	Yes	NBC
2017	Chicago Justice	Yes	Yes	Yes	NBC
2017	Law & Order True Crime	No	Yes	No	NBC
2018–present	FBI	Yes	Yes	Yes	CBS
2020–2025	FBI: Most Wanted	No	Yes	No	CBS
2021–2025	Law & Order: Organized Crime	Yes	Yes	Yes	NBC/Peacock
2021–2025	FBI: International	Yes	Yes	No	CBS
2024–present	Law & Order Toronto: Criminal Intent	Yes	No	No	CityTV
2025	On Call	Yes	Yes	Yes	Prime Video
2025–present	CIA	No	Yes	No	CBS

==== Unscripted ====
Year	Title	Creator	Executive Producer	Network
2013–present	Cold Justice	Yes	Yes	TNT/Oxygen
2015	Cold Justice: Sex Crimes	Yes	Yes	TNT
2015	3AM	Yes	Yes	Showtime
2015–2023	Nightwatch	Yes	Yes	A&E/NBCUniversal
2017	Inside the FBI: New York	Yes	Yes	USA Network
2017–2020	Criminal Confessions	Yes	Yes	Oxygen
2019	Murder for Hire	No	Yes	Oxygen
2019	First Responders Live	No	Yes	Fox
2023	LA Fire and Rescue	No	Yes	NBC
2023	Blood & Money	Yes	Yes	NBC
2024	Homicide; Season 1: New York; Season 2: Los Angeles	Yes	Yes	Netflix

==== Animated ====
- Family Guy (2012); Guest voice in "Ratings Guy"

==== Foreign ====
- Paris enquêtes criminelles (2007–2008)

==== Thanks ====
- Community ("Basic Lupine Urology", 2012)

== See also ==
- List of celebrities by net worth
