= André the Giant (film) =

2018 television programme

- Film poster
- Written by: Simon Pummell
- Directed by: Jason Hehir
- Music by: Thomas Caffey
- Country of origin: United States

Production
- Producers: Bill Simmons; Matt Maxson; Jacob Rogal; Rick Bernstein
- Editor: Harris Mendheim
- Running time: 85 minutes
- Production companies: HBO Sports; WWE Studios; JMH Films; Ringer Films

Original release
- Network: HBO
- Release: April 10, 2018

André the Giant is a 2018 American documentary film based on the life of French professional wrestler and actor André René Roussimoff, best known as André the Giant. The documentary covers André's life with gigantism. The film features professional wrestlers and media personalities such as Vince McMahon, Hulk Hogan, Pat Patterson, Tim White, Ric Flair, Dave Meltzer, Arnold Schwarzenegger, Billy Crystal as well as family members discussing André's life.

André the Giant was released on HBO on April 10, 2018. The film was executively produced by Janine Marmot and Bill Simmons, who had been interested in creating a documentary on André previously. The documentary was slated as focusing on his "upbringing in France, his celebrated career in WWE and his forays in the entertainment world".

== Reception ==
The review aggregation website Rotten Tomatoes reports an approval rating of 96%, based on 23 reviews, with an average rating of 8.4/10. The website's consensus reads, "Well-crafted and entertaining, Andre the Giant is a compelling celebration of a wrestling legend." Metacritic, which uses a weighted average, assigned the film a score of 78 out of 100, based on 6 critics, indicating "generally favorable" reviews.

In July 2018, HBO claimed that André the Giant was the most watched sports documentary in its history.
