= Arrest & Trial =

- Genre: Documentary; nontraditional court show
- Presented by: Brian Dennehy
- Narrated by: Steve Zirnkilton
- Country of origin: United States
- Original language: English
- No. of seasons: 2
- No. of episodes: 195

Production
- Executive producers: Dick Wolf; Maury Povich
- Running time: 23 minutes
- Production companies: MoPo Entertainment; Wolf Films; Studios USA Television Distribution

Original release
- Network: Syndication
- Release: 2000 – 2001

Arrest & Trial is an American, syndicated nontraditional court show which follows individual criminal cases (commission, police investigation, and actual trial) via a combination of re-enactments and real trial footage. Episodes run for 30 minutes, and the program aired during the 2000–01 television season. Brian Dennehy hosted. It has been described as a reality show.

The program was produced by Dick Wolf, executive producer and creator of the Law & Order franchise.

Steve Zirnkilton, also of the Law & Order franchise was the show's narrator.

== Episodes ==
=== Series overview ===
Season	Episodes	Originally released	
Season	Episodes	First released	Last released
1	95	October 9, 2000	December 22, 2000
2	100	January 29, 2001	September 14, 2001

=== Season 1 (2000) ===
No. overall	No. in season	Title	Original release date
1	1	"Best Friend"	October 9, 2000
2	2	"Supermarket Abductor"	October 9, 2000
3	3	"Dr. Lips: Prescription for Death"	October 10, 2000
4	4	"Sailing, Sailing"	October 10, 2000
5	5	"Frat Rats"	October 11, 2000
6	6	"Pillow Pyro"	October 11, 2000
7	7	"Three in a Hole: Buried Alive"	October 12, 2000
8	8	"Wrong Man"	October 12, 2000
9	9	"Biting Postal Worker"	October 13, 2000
10	10	"Mall Murders"	October 13, 2000
11	11	"Family Betrayal"	October 16, 2000
12	12	"Linda Sobek Murder"	October 16, 2000
13	13	"Mystery of King Tut"	October 17, 2000
14	14	"Sex, Drugs & Rock and Roll?"	October 17, 2000
15	15	"Case of the Rubik's Cube"	October 18, 2000
16	16	"Mother's Day Murder"	October 18, 2000
17	17	"Evil Soul"	October 19, 2000
18	18	"West Hills Bandits"	October 19, 2000
19	19	"For the Love of a Baywatch Babe"	October 20, 2000
20	20	"Husband Kills; Wife Confesses"	October 20, 2000
21	21	"Face From Bones"	October 23, 2000
22	22	"Teenage Prostitutes"	October 23, 2000
23	23	"Stripping Down Chippendales"	October 24, 2000
24	24	"Vegas Dancer Stalked"	October 24, 2000
25	25	"Closet Killer"	October 25, 2000
26	26	"Holtsinger Gunslinger"	October 25, 2000
27	27	"Scoutmaster Kills Wife"	October 26, 2000
28	28	"Sleepwalking Defense"	October 26, 2000
29	29	"Leisurely Leisure"	October 27, 2000
30	30	"Romeo Ramon"	October 27, 2000
31	31	"Bittaker Murders"	October 30, 2000
32	32	"Daddy's Little Girl"	October 30, 2000
33	33	"Greedy Grandsons"	October 31, 2000
34	34	"Love Gone Wrong"	October 31, 2000
35	35	"Deadly Delivery"	November 1, 2000
36	36	"The Wrong Hit"	November 1, 2000
37	37	"Valentine Murders"	November 2, 2000
38	38	"Vampire Cult Killers"	November 2, 2000
39	39	"The Burning of Crosses"	November 3, 2000
40	40	"War on Drugs"	November 3, 2000
41	41	"Baby 'Napping"	November 6, 2000
42	42	"Tequila Sunset"	November 6, 2000
43	43	"Armored Car Murders"	November 7, 2000
44	44	"Make-Up Murder"	November 7, 2000
45	45	"An Eye for an Eye"	November 8, 2000
46	46	"Buried in the Backyard"	November 8, 2000
47	47	"Angel of Death"	November 9, 2000
48	48	"Cheerleader Murder"	November 9, 2000
49	49	"Attack by Pretense"	November 10, 2000
50	50	"Hricko Case"	November 10, 2000
51	51	"Drug Doctors"	November 13, 2000
52	52	"The Hit From Jail"	November 13, 2000
53	53	"Mako"	November 14, 2000
54	54	"The Perfect Couple"	November 14, 2000
55	55	"Tumbe"	November 15, 2000
56	56	"Unusual Voice"	November 15, 2000
57	57	"Deadly Safe"	November 16, 2000
58	58	"Principal"	November 16, 2000
59	59	"Armando Garcia"	November 17, 2000
60	60	"Bank Robbers in Love"	November 17, 2000
61	61	"Cowboy Criminal"	November 20, 2000
62	62	"Family Dishonor"	November 20, 2000
63	63	"Lords of Chaos"	November 21, 2000
64	64	"The Grim Reaper"	November 21, 2000
65	65	"Operation Hotwheels"	November 22, 2000
66	66	"Overseas Ransom"	November 22, 2000
67	67	"Chaney Case"	November 23, 2000
68	68	"Phillips' Fiery Flames"	November 23, 2000
69	69	"Hot Shots"	November 24, 2000
70	70	"Nasty Bandits"	November 24, 2000
71	71	"Girl Gang Leader"	November 27, 2000
72	72	"Tractor Trailer Kidnapping"	November 27, 2000
73	73	"Natural Born Killer"	November 28, 2000
74	74	"Night Stalker"	November 28, 2000
75	75	"Nazi Arms Dealer"	November 29, 2000
76	76	"She Said, They Said"	November 29, 2000
77	77	"Candyman"	November 30, 2000
78	78	"Cotton Club Mystery"	November 30, 2000
79	79	"Broken Pearls"	December 1, 2000
80	80	"The Code"	December 1, 2000
81	81	"Nightmare Nurse"	December 4, 2000
82	82	"Mustang Mayhem"	December 5, 2000
83	83	"Murder for Little Money"	December 6, 2000
84	84	"Spittin' Bullets"	December 7, 2000
85	85	"Vacation Nightmare"	December 8, 2000
86	86	"Deadly Affair"	December 11, 2000
87	87	"Neighbor Double Murder"	December 12, 2000
88	88	"Long Kept Secret"	December 13, 2000
89	89	"You're Getting Very Sleepy"	December 14, 2000
90	90	"Dr. Death"	December 15, 2000
91	91	"Death on Mothers Day"	December 18, 2000
92	92	"Insurance King Crime"	December 19, 2000
93	93	"Frozen Dinner: The Crucial Clue"	December 20, 2000
94	94	"Murder by Poison"	December 21, 2000
95	95	"BBQ's and Bloody Marys"	December 22, 2000

=== Season 2 (2001) ===
No. overall	No. in season	Title	Original release date
96	1	"M.O.: A Sinister Kiss"	January 29, 2001
97	2	"Trust Fund Murder Exposed"	January 30, 2001
98	3	"Evil Twin"	January 31, 2001
99	4	"Miami Blues"	February 1, 2001
100	5	"Baby Snatcher"	February 2, 2001
101	6	"Riddle Me This"	February 5, 2001
102	7	"Burning Love"	February 6, 2001
103	8	"Woodland Hills Murder"	February 7, 2001
104	9	"Slave Ranch"	February 8, 2001
105	10	"Three Out of Four"	February 9, 2001
106	11	"Slumber Party Abduction"	February 12, 2001
107	12	"Risky High-Rise Robber"	February 13, 2001
108	13	"Burton Boys"	February 14, 2001
109	14	"A Very Evil Man"	February 15, 2001
110	15	"Operation: Gorilla"	February 16, 2001
111	16	"Ruthless Ricky"	February 19, 2001
112	17	"Husband Draws Deadly Bath"	February 20, 2001
113	18	"All-American Girl"	February 21, 2001
114	19	"A Second Look"	February 22, 2001
115	20	"Pimp 'Till I Die"	February 23, 2001
116	21	"Texas Prison Break: Part 1"	February 26, 2001
117	22	"Texas Prison Break: Part 2"	February 27, 2001
118	23	"Kiko Returns"	February 28, 2001
119	24	"Deadly Greed"	March 1, 2001
120	25	"White Collar Criminal"	March 2, 2001
121	26	"Almost Perfect Murder"	March 12, 2001
122	27	"Beachside Attacker"	March 13, 2001
123	28	"Evaporating Love"	March 14, 2001
124	29	"Murder by the Book"	March 15, 2001
125	30	"Patience"	March 16, 2001
126	31	"Deadly Love"	March 19, 2001
127	32	"Pyro Robles"	March 20, 2001
128	33	"Ninja Bandit"	March 21, 2001
129	34	"Baby Seat Bait"	March 22, 2001
130	35	"Stolen Car Clue"	March 23, 2001
131	36	"While Innocents Sleep"	April 16, 2001
132	37	"Snakeheads"	April 17, 2001
133	38	"Indian Trackers"	April 18, 2001
134	39	"Las Vegas Black Widow"	April 19, 2001
135	40	"Volatile Marriage Ends in Murder"	April 20, 2001
136	41	"Lethal Husband"	April 23, 2001
137	42	"Doctor Beware"	April 24, 2001
138	43	"Latin Lover's Murder"	April 25, 2001
139	44	"Die Hard Dad"	April 26, 2001
140	45	"Cold Blooded Cupid"	April 27, 2001
141	46	"Chilling Confession"	April 30, 2001
142	47	"Child Abductor"	May 1, 2001
143	48	"Iceman: Mob Killer"	May 2, 2001
144	49	"Corridor Killer"	May 3, 2001
145	50	"World Trade Center"	May 4, 2001
146	51	"Capano Case: Part 1"	May 7, 2001
147	52	"Capano Case: Part 2"	May 8, 2001
148	53	"Red Dog Case"	May 9, 2001
149	54	"Convenience Store Killing"	May 10, 2001
150	55	"Porteous' Print"	May 11, 2001
151	56	"Multiple MO Killer"	May 14, 2001
152	57	"Fugitive on a Rampage"	May 15, 2001
153	58	"Sister's Revenge"	May 16, 2001
154	59	"Romeo Escapee on the Run"	May 17, 2001
155	60	"Cleaning House"	May 18, 2001
156	61	"Cop's Son Kills Cop"	May 21, 2001
157	62	"Freeway Killer"	May 22, 2001
158	63	"Little Pink Nails"	May 23, 2001
159	64	"Trick or Treat Murders"	May 24, 2001
160	65	"Gas Gangsters"	May 25, 2001
161	66	"Botched Hit"	May 28, 2001
162	67	"Operation Green Ice"	May 29, 2000
163	68	"Deadly Dad"	May 30, 2001
164	69	"Kiko"	May 31, 2001
165	70	"Femmes Fatales"	June 1, 2001
166	71	"Uncle Hilty"	June 25, 2001
167	72	"Wrong Prescription"	June 26, 2001
168	73	"Noriega"	June 27, 2001
169	74	"Caught by Surprise"	June 28, 2001
170	75	"Serial Killers"	June 29, 2001
171	76	"Family Cover-up"	July 2, 2001
172	77	"Officer Down"	July 3, 2001
173	78	"Killer Movie"	July 4, 2001
174	79	"Double Double Cross"	July 5, 2001
175	80	"Cano"	July 6, 2001
176	81	"Silence Proves Deadly"	July 9, 2001
177	82	"Can't Escape Justice"	July 10, 2001
178	83	"Cop Killer"	July 11, 2001
179	84	"Bear of a Case"	July 12, 2001
180	85	"Wasted Youth"	July 13, 2001
181	86	"Smile Now, Cry Later"	July 23, 2001
182	87	"Smack Smugglers"	July 24, 2001
183	88	"Forensics"	July 25, 2001
184	89	"The Ride"	July 26, 2001
185	90	"Barking Up the Wrong Tree"	July 27, 2001
186	91	"Holy Day Murders"	July 30, 2001
187	92	"Bad Love"	July 31, 2001
188	93	"Janitor Brought to Justice"	August 1, 2001
189	94	"Tunnel Case"	August 2, 2001
190	95	"Delivery Man"	August 3, 2001
191	96	"Stealing Was Not Enough"	September 10, 2001
192	97	"German Tourist Tragedy"	September 11, 2001
193	98	"Carlos Lehder"	September 12, 2001
194	99	"Forced Prostitution"	September 13, 2001
195	100	"Drugs and Murder in Vermont"	September 14, 2001
