= Return of the King: The Fall and Rise of Elvis Presley =

- Genre: Documentary
- Directed by: Jason Hehir
- Starring: Priscilla Presley; Bruce Springsteen; Baz Luhrmann; Conan O'Brien; Billy Corgan; Darlene Love; Jerry Schilling; Robbie Robertson
- Music by: Thomas Caffey

Production
- Producers: Tomas Odelfelt; Matthew Chase; Priscilla Presley; John Eddie; Nicolas Eisenberg; Jerry Schilling
- Cinematography: Thomas McCallum
- Editor: Ross Hockrow
- Running time: 92 minutes
- Production company: Netflix/Little Room Films

Return of The King: The Fall and Rise of Elvis Presley is a 2024 American documentary directed by Jason Hehir about Elvis Presley's 1968 comeback TV special. It debuted on Netflix on November 13, 2024.

== Plot ==
Elvis' former wife Priscilla, family friend Jerry Schilling, and others discuss details, including some personal experience, concerning the triumphant comeback performance for Elvis which aired on U.S. national television on December 3, 1968 and proved to be a gamble, but would result in his music career being revived following a long period of being more recognized for acting in feature films.

== Participants (alphabetical) ==
- John Lennon (archive)
- Paul McCartney (archive)
- George Harrison (archive)
- Ringo Starr (archive)
- Steve Binder (archive)
- Billy Corgan
- Bob Dylan (archive)
- D.J. Fontana (archive)
- John Jackson
- Ernst Jørgensen
- Darlene Love
- Baz Luhrmann
- Scotty Moore (archive)
- Conan O'Brien
- Elvis Presley (archive)
- Priscilla Presley
- Robbie Robertson
- Jerry Schilling
- Bruce Springsteen
- Wright Thompson
- Sandi Tompkins
