= This Is a Robbery =

2021 American documentary film

- Genre: Documentary; Historical drama
- Directed by: Colin Barnicle
- Music by: Jason Hill
- Country of origin: United States
- Original language: English
- No. of episodes: 4

Production
- Executive producers: Colin Barnicle; Nick Barnicle; Jane Rosenthal; Berry Welsh; Linda Pizzuti Henry
- Producers: Jeff Siegel; Rachel Koteen; Bobby O'Brien; Mary Abramson
- Cinematography: Stephen McCarthy
- Editors: Kelly Kendrick; Chris Kronus; Matt Cascella; Andrew Jenter
- Running time: 50–57 minutes
- Production company: Barnicle Brothers Production TriBeCa Productions

Original release
- Network: Netflix
- Release: April 7, 2021

This Is a Robbery: The World's Biggest Art Heist is a 2021 American documentary miniseries about the 1990 robbery of the Isabella Stewart Gardner Museum in Boston. The four-part series was directed by Colin Barnicle, who also produced alongside his brother Nick Barnicle. The series was produced over a seven-year period, beginning in 2014. It was released on Netflix on April 7, 2021, receiving generally positive reviews from critics.

== Episodes ==
No.	Title	Original release date
1	"They Looked Like Cops"	April 7, 2021
In Boston 1990, two men dressed as police officers enter the Isabella Stewart Gardner Museum, and leave with Rembrandt's The Storm on the Sea of Galilee and A Lady and Gentleman in Black, Vermeer's The Concert, and ten other works of art.
2	"Vipers in the Grass"	April 7, 2021
As law enforcement scrutinizes the museum's security, a suspect emerges.
3	"We've Seen It"	April 7, 2021
As alleged sightings of the stolen art are reported, organized crime activity leads to possible suspects and motives for the robbery.
4	"$10 Million Reward"	April 7, 2021
An informant and sting operation lead federal agents to a small-time mobster with possible connections to the robbery.

== Reception ==
For the series, review aggregator Rotten Tomatoes reported an approval rating of 81% based on 16 reviews, with an average rating of 7.4/10. The website's critics consensus reads, "This is a Robbery may not be the world's most innovative docuseries, but a fascinating subject and an acute attention to detail make for a riveting watch." Metacritic gave the series a weighted average score of 70 out of 100 based on 13 critic reviews, indicating "generally favorable reviews".
