= Linda Pizzuti Henry =

American businesswoman (born 1978)

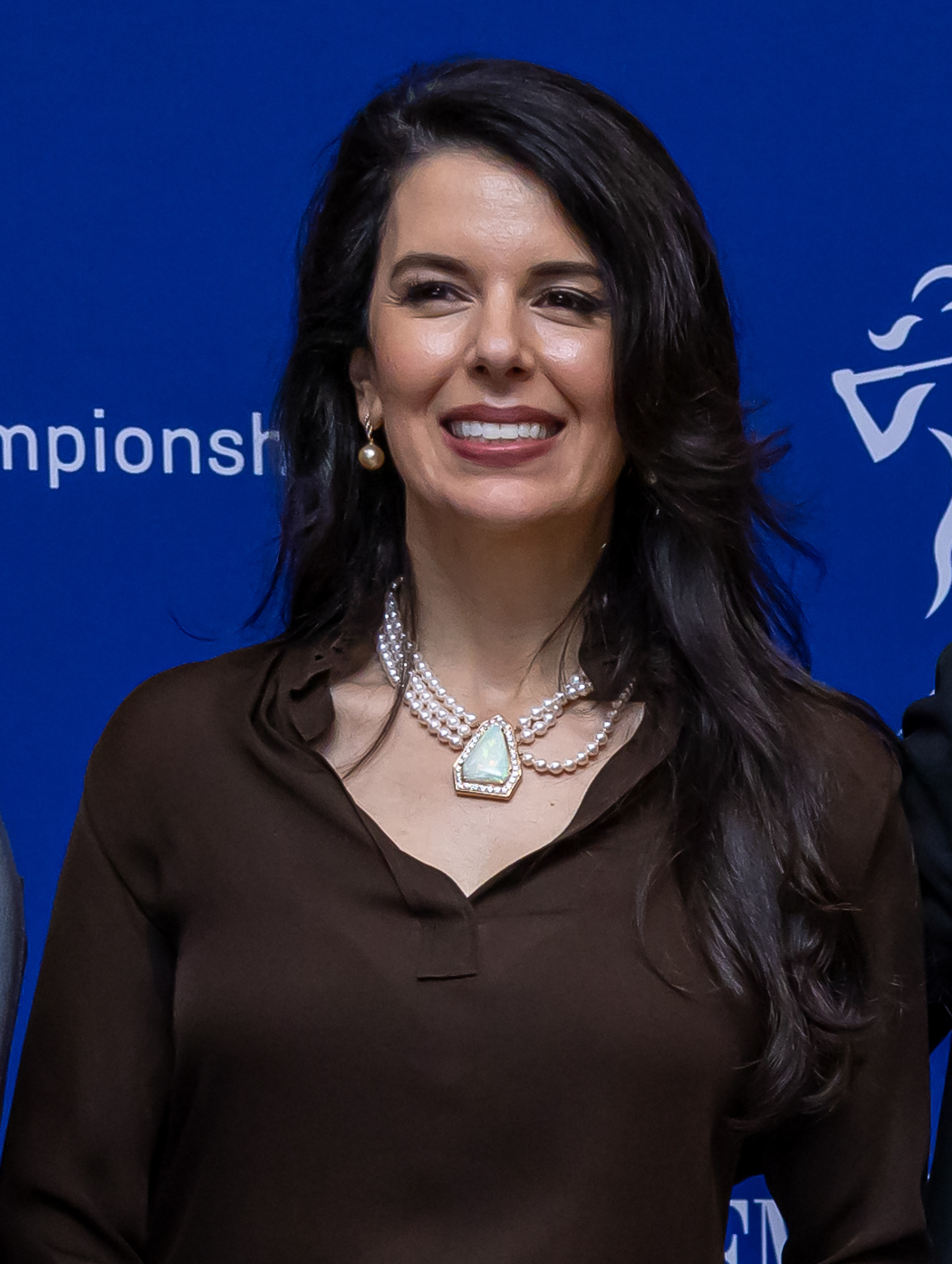
- Born: Linda Karen Pizzuti; September 20, 1978 (age 48); Lynnfield, Massachusetts, U.S.
- Education: Babson College; Massachusetts Institute of Technology (MIT)
- Occupations: Businesswoman media producer
- Known for: CEO of Boston Globe Media Partners
- Spouse: John W. Henry (m. 2009)
- Children: 2
- Parents: Donato "Don" Pizzuti (father); Maria Pizzuti (mother)

Linda Henry (née Pizzuti; born September 20, 1978), is an American business executive, media producer, author, and philanthropist. who is the chief executive officer of Boston Globe Media Partners. A member of the Boston Globe Media , she oversees operations for The Boston Globe, Boston.com, Boston magazine, and Stat News. Pizzuti is a partner in Fenway Sports Group (FSG), which is the parent company of several sports franchises, including the Boston Boston Red Sox, Liverpool F.C., and the Pittsburgh Penguins.

Born into a wealthy family, Pizzuti graduated from the Massachusetts Institute of Technology in 2005 with a master’s degree in real estate development. She became an employee of her family's real estate business, named Pizzuti Development.

Pizzuti's film career began as a producer in 2013. she produced several stage plays before gaining wider recognition for the American comedy-drama film Lucky Them (2013), which earned a nomination from the Georgia Film Critics Association. She has also co-produced a number of television programs, including NESN Clubhouse (2014). and NESN Next Producer (2015), on the New England Sports Network which aired for eight seasons CodeGirl (2015). She received multiple regional Emmy Awards and was also nominated for a Gotham TV Awards and an International Documentary Association Award for the series Murder in Boston: Roots, Rampage, and Reckoning (2023).

== Early life and education ==
Linda Karen Pizzuti was born on September 20, 1978, in Lynnfield, Massachusetts. She is the youngest child of Donato and Maria Pizzuti. She is of Italian-American descent. She grew up with her older siblings, Tina, Laura, and Donna, in the Lynnfield neighbourhood. Donato Pizzuti is an engineer, real estate investor, and developer who graduated from Northeastern University and owns Pizzuti Development, a company where her sisters are also employed.

Linda attended and earned a Bachelor of Science degree from Babson College and later completed a master’s degree in real estate development at the Massachusetts Institute of Technology (MIT) in 2005.

== Career ==
=== Early career ===
Pizzuti Henry began her professional career in real estate development, a field in which her father was also active. Her public profile increased following her marriage to John W. Henry, principal owner of Fenway Sports Group, in 2009. She later assumed leadership roles within organizations affiliated with Henry.

=== The Boston Globe / Boston Globe Media Partners ===
In 2013, John W. Henry, founder of the investment management firm John W. Henry & Company, acquired The Boston Globe from The New York Times Company. In November 2020, The Boston Globe named Linda Pizzuti Henry as the chief executive officer of Boston Globe Media Partners, the parent company of The Boston Globe, Boston.com, and STAT News. Prior to her appointment, she held an ownership stake in Boston Globe Media Partners alongside her husband, John W. Henry.

A 2020 report by The New York Times showed John W. Henry's involvement in his wife's increasing leadership role within the company. Matt Rocheleau, a Globe investigative reporter and union representative, expressed skepticism at the time about the likelihood of quick resolutions to internal issues following her promotion.

As the Chief Executive Officer of Boston Globe Media Partners, she has overseen initiatives aimed at digital innovation and the modernization of journalistic and business practices at The Boston Globe.

In addition to her executive work, Pizzuti Henry has contributed as a producer on media projects, including documentaries focused on sports and civic topics. She is also involved in the strategic management of Fenway Sports Group's portfolio, which includes the Boston Red Sox, Liverpool F.C., and the Pittsburgh Penguins.

== Philanthropy and civic engagement ==
Pizzuti Henry is active in philanthropic initiatives and civic engagement. She is a co-founder of HUBweek, a collaborative event created by The Boston Globe, Harvard University, MIT, and Massachusetts General Hospital, which focuses on the convergence of art, science, and technology. She serves as chair of both the Boston Globe Foundation and the John W. Henry Family Foundation, and holds trustee roles with the Red Sox Foundation and the Liverpool Football Club Foundation.

== Personal life ==
In 2009, Linda Pizzuti married John W. Henry, principal owner of Fenway Sports Group and publisher of The Boston Globe . The couple resides in the Boston area and have a daughter and a son. They are known for their active involvement in both the media and sports industries.

== Filmography ==
Year	Title	Producer	Writer
2013	Lucky Them	Co-executive	No
2014	NESN Clubhouse	Co-producer	No
2015	NESN Next Producer	Co-executive	No
2015	CodeGirl	Executive	No
2017	Wally's Opening Day	Executive	No
2018	Mapplethorpe	Yes	No
2021	This Is a Robbery: The World's Greatest Art Heist	Executive	No
2013	Murder in Boston: Roots, Rampage, and Reckoning	Executive	No
2024	Bearing Witness: A Name & A Voice	Yes	No
2024	American Sports Story	Co-executive	No
