= North Road (company) =

American global media production & distribution company

The North Road Company
- Type: Subsidiary
- Founded: July 2022; 4 years ago
- Founders: Peter Chernin; Jenno Topping; Jesse Jacobs
- Headquarters: Los Angeles, California, United States
- Parent: Mediawan (2026–present)
- Divisions: North Road International
- Subsidiaries: 44 Blue Productions; Chernin Entertainment; Karga Seven Pictures; Kinetic Content; Omaha Productions; Perro Azul; Two One Five Entertainment
- Website: www.northroadcompany.com

The North Road Company, also known as North Road, is an American global content production & distribution studio founded in 2022 by Peter Chernin, the founder of The Chernin Group; since 2026, it has been owned by French media entertainment production company Mediawan, that produces scripted, unscripted, and documentary film and television content. It serves as a multi-genre powerhouse studio, housing entities like Chernin Entertainment, Kinetic Content and Words + Pictures, with notable projects including Love is Blind, Ford v Ferrari and The Last Dance.

== History ==
=== Formation and expansions ===
The company was formed in July 2022 when Peter Chernin, founder and CEO of both Chernin Entertainment and the former's parent The Chernin Group, had departed the latter parent and announced that he had taken his film and television production company Chernin Entertainment and its unscripted production studio Words + Pictures to establish a global independent and production content studio that was entitled The North Road Company. The two subsidiaries became part of his new company as labels, while the new global company had acquired the US assets of German entertainment and international distribution company Red Arrow Studios from ProSiebenSat.1 Media (which were Kinetic Content, Left/Right Productions, Half Yard Productions, Dorsey Pictures and 44 Blue Productions) and the remaining 50% stake in unscripted documentary production company Words + Pictures.

Peter Chernin became CEO and chairman of the new company, with Chernin Entertainment veteran Jenno Topping retaining his role president of Chernin Entertainment and started overseeing The North Road Company's scripted film and television operations alongside Words + Pictures founder Connor Schell, who had continued running the unscripted production company under North Road and would assume The North Road Company's unscripted operations as head of unscripted. The new global content studio had also established its international division based in England, named North Road International, as Jan Frouman (who joined Chernin Entertainment three months prior back in April of that year) became The North Road Company's president; former AMC Networks executive Kirstin Jones joined The North Road Company and became the global studio's president of international film and television. The two would run North Road's new international division, with their international office being based in London, England.

In June 2023, The North Road Company had its first acquisition when they had brought Istanbul and LA-based Turkish/American film and television drama production company Karga Seven Pictures to expand North Road's scripted operations; the acquisition of Karga Seven Pictures reunited the company with Red Arrow's former American unscripted production subsidiaries (which were Kinetic Content, Left/Right Productions, Half Yard Productions, Dorsey Pictures, and 44 Blue Productions that North Road acquired a year prior in 2022), with Karga Seven Pictures co-founders & producers Sarah Wetherbee, Emre Sahin and Kelly McPherson continuing to lead the company.

Five months later in November of that year, The North Road Company had acquired a majority stake in Los Angeles-based production company Two One Five Entertainment, led by the founders of the hip hop band The Roots, Tariq "Black Thought" Trotter and Ahmir "Questlove" Thompson. The North Road Company would be financing Two One Five Entertainment's future film and television projects, along with North Road expanding Two One Five into the scripted business.

In January 2025, The North Road Company expanded into the Latin American production business with the acquisition of Mexican television production company Perro Azul, marking North Road's second international production studio acquisition; Perro Azul's founders Alexis Fridman and Juan Uruchurtu will continued leading the company under North Road. Most recently, the company signed a film deal with Apple TV+.

=== Acquisition by Mediawan ===
In January 2026, French media entertainment studio Mediawan had entered advanced talks to acquire The North Road Company, including its scripted entertainment production arm Chernin Entertainment, its minority stake in Omaha Productions, Karga Seven Pictures, Perro Azul and its unscripted production operations from its founder Peter Chernin that would expand Mediawan's American production operations. A week later on the 30th in that same month, Mediawan confirmed that they had acquired The North Road Company and its various subsidiaries from Peter Chernin. Chernin subsequently joined Mediawan's board and continued leading North Road as non-executive chairman under Mediawan.

== Subsidiaries ==
=== 44 Blue Productions ===
44 Blue Productions is a Burbank-based reality production studio founded in 1984 by Rasha Drachkovitch and Stephanie Noonan Drachkovitch, with the Drachkovitchs leading the company as co-CEOs and Creative Directors.

- Chernin Entertainment

=== Karga Seven Pictures ===
Karga Seven Pictures is an American/Turkish scripted production subsidiary of The North Road Company that was founded in 2008 by Sarah Wetherbee, Emre Sahin, and Kelly McPherson.

On January 19, 2017, Karga Seven Pictures opened its Turkish production division based in Istanbul that would produce local television series in that country including worldwide co-productions named Karga Seven Turkey with president of its parent, Tamer Uner, alongside former Mindshare Turkey CEO Ozer Sata, who had joined Karga Seven's new Turkish production unit via CEO and Karga Seven's former CCO Todd Cohen.

- Kinetic Content
  - Kinetic UK - A British production division of Kinetic Content that is producing adaptations of Kinetic Content's programming for the UK market.
- Words + Pictures
