= Wolf Entertainment =

American television production company

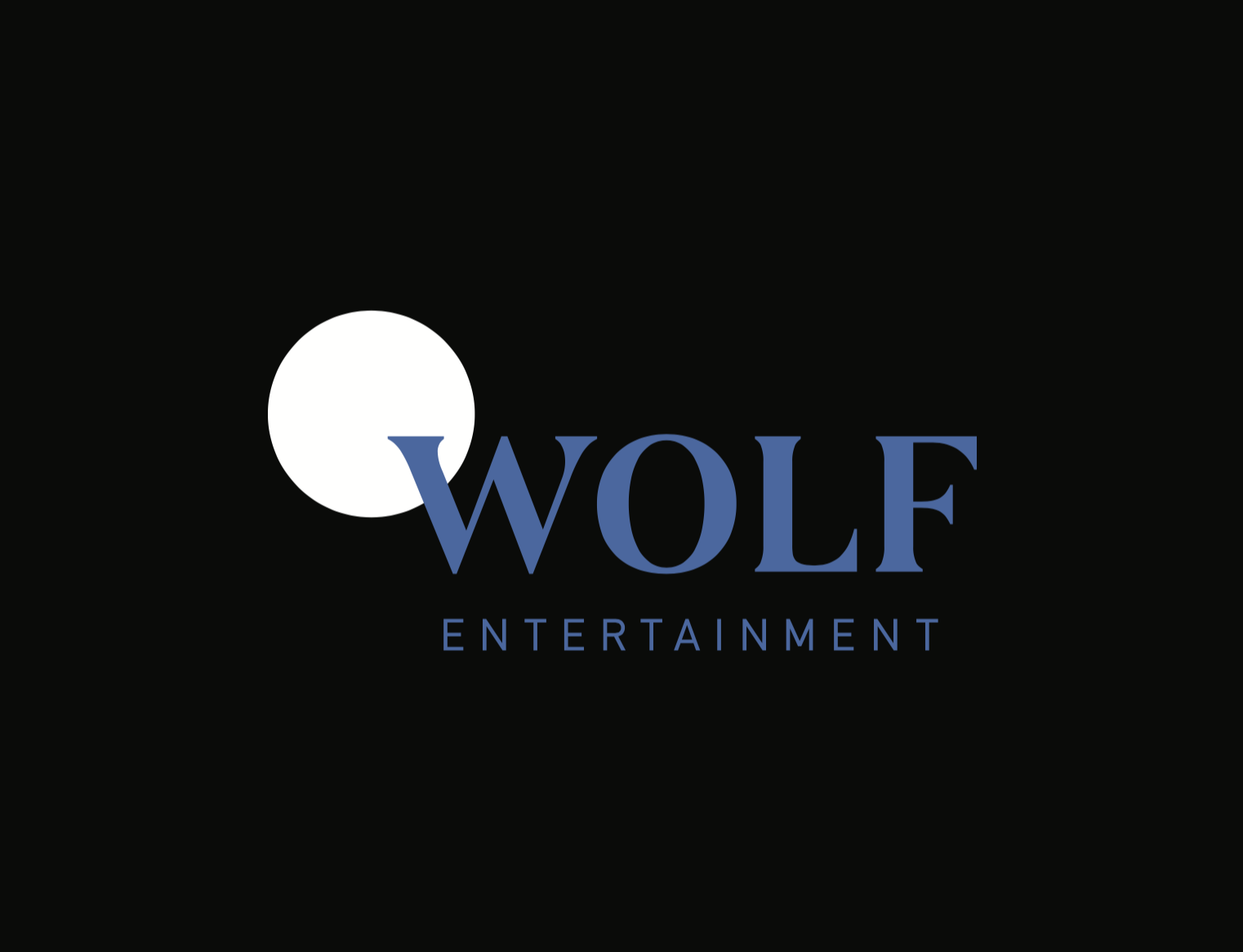
- Logo used since 2019
- Formerly: Wolf Films (1988–2019)
- Type: Private
- Industry: Television
- Founded: February 29, 1988; 38 years ago
- Founder: Dick Wolf
- Headquarters: Universal Studios Lot, Universal City, California, United States
- Key people: Dick Wolf (chairman and CEO); Peter Jankowski (president and COO); Arthur W. Forney (head of Post Production); Tom Thayer (head of unscripted series); Anastasia Puglisi (SVP of scripted series)
- Products: Law & Order franchise Chicago franchise FBI franchise
- Website: www.wolfentertainment.com

Wolf Entertainment is an American television production company founded by producer Dick Wolf in 1988. The company produces television franchises including Law & Order, Chicago, and FBI.

In April 2023, Wolf Entertainment extended its multi-year agreement with Universal Television through 2027, building on the original "nine-figure deal" signed in February 2020 that spanned both broadcast and streaming platforms.

Originally named Wolf Films, the company was rebranded as Wolf Entertainment in 2019. As of 2024, it has produced 40 television series totaling over 2,500 episodes. The company has received 96 Emmy nominations.

== Overview ==
Wolf Entertainment produces several prime-time network television series that air on NBC and CBS. Current series include FBI, FBI: Most Wanted, and FBI: International (Tuesdays); Chicago Fire, Chicago P.D., and Chicago Med (Wednesdays); and Law & Order, Law & Order: Special Victims Unit, and Law & Order: Organized Crime (Thursdays).

In 2023, Wolf Entertainment entered the streaming market with On Call, a half-hour drama series. Initially, Amazon Freevee, in a joint production with Amazon MGM Studios and Universal Television, picked up the series but later moved it to Amazon Prime Video, with the series' release occurring in January 2025. It was cancelled after one season in May 2025.

== Leadership structure ==
Wolf Entertainment is led by founder Dick Wolf, with Peter Jankowski serving as Chief Operating Officer. In December 2024, the company hired Kevin Plunkett as Executive Vice President of Development, a role previously held by Danielle Gelber from 2011 to 2016. Elliot Wolf heads the company's digital department.

== Filmography ==
=== Television series ===
==== Scripted ====
Year(s)	Title	Network
1989	Gideon Oliver	ABC
1989	Christine Cromwell	ABC
1990	Nasty Boys	NBC
1990	H.E.L.P.	ABC
1990–2010; 2022–present	Law & Order	NBC
1992	Mann & Machine	NBC
1992	The Human Factor	CBS
1993	Crime & Punishment	NBC
1993	South Beach	NBC
1994–1998	New York Undercover	Fox
1995	The Wright Verdicts	CBS
1996	Swift Justice	UPN
1997	Feds	CBS
1997–1998	Players	NBC
1998	Exiled: A Law & Order Movie	NBC
1998	The Invisible Man	N/A
1999–present	Law & Order: Special Victims Unit	NBC
2000	D.C.	The WB
2000–2001	Deadline	NBC
2000	Arrest & Trial	Syndication
2001–2011	Law & Order: Criminal Intent	NBC/USA Network
2003	Dragnet	ABC
2005–2006	Law & Order: Trial by Jury	NBC
2006	Conviction	NBC
2009–2014	Law & Order: UK	ITV
2010–2011	Law & Order: LA	NBC
2012–present	Chicago Fire	NBC
2014–present	Chicago P.D.	NBC
2015–present	Chicago Med	NBC
2017	Chicago Justice	NBC
2017	Law & Order True Crime	NBC
2018–present	FBI	CBS
2018	Law & Order: Hate Crimes	NBC
2020–2025	FBI: Most Wanted	CBS
2021–present	Law & Order: Organized Crime	NBC
2021–2025	FBI: International	CBS
2025	On Call	Prime Video
2026–present	CIA	CBS

==== Unscripted ====
Year(s)	Title	Network	Notes
2000–2002	Arrest & Trial	First-run syndication	co-production with Studios USA Television Distribution and MoPo Productions
2002–2004	Crime & Punishment	NBC	co-production with Universal Television Distribution, Anonymous Content and Shape Films
2012	Stars Earn Stripes	NBC	co-production with Universal Television, One Three Media and Bill's Market & Television Productions
2013–present	Cold Justice	TNT/Oxygen	co-production with Magical Elves
2015–2023	Nightwatch	A&E	co-production with 44 Blue Productions
2015	Cold Justice: Sex Crimes	TNT	co-production with Magical Elves
2015	3AM	Showtime	co-production with Showtime Networks and Left/Right Productions
2017	Inside the FBI: New York	USA Network	
2017–2020	Criminal Confessions	Oxygen	co-production with Oxygen Media Productions and Shed Media
2019	Murder for Hire	Oxygen	co-production with Oxygen Media Productions, Shed Media and Green Lakes Productions
2019	First Responders Live	Fox	co-production with 44 Blue Productions
2022–2024	Final Moments	Oxygen	co-production with Oxygen Media Productions and Good Caper Content
2023	LA Fire and Rescue	NBC	co-production with Universal Television Alternative Studio and 44 Blue Productions
2023–present	Prosecuting Evil with Kelly Siegler	Oxygen	co-production with Universal Television Alternative Studio, Magical Elves and Green Lakes Productions
2025–present	Death Row Confidential: Secrets of a Serial Killer	Oxygen	co-production with Universal Television Alternative Studio, Fireside Pictures and Vanity Fair Studios
2025–present	The Death Investigator with Barbara Butcher	Oxygen	co-production with Universal Television Alternative Studio and Alfred Street Industries
