= Côte Ouest Audiovisuel =

Côte Ouest Audiovisuel is an Ivorien distributor and producer of television content, owned since 2023 by Mediawan. Founded by Franco-Tunisian businessman Bernard Azria in 1997, the company made its name by importing Latin American telenovelas into African television networks, and opened an office in Mauritius in 2010 to deal with English-language titles. Since the mid-2010s, the company branched out into original production.

== History ==
Azria founded Côte Ouest in 1997. Initially, the company distributed American TV series, and then, Brazilian telenovelas, to public television stations in Africa. TV Globo's international sales unit is one of its longest-serving clients, being active since practically the company's beginning. In 2010, it set up an office in Mauritius to handle English dubbed content, and in 2015, it launched Nina TV (now Nina Novelas), broadcasting telenovelas from its back catalogue, first in French, and later launching a second channel in English.

During the late 2000s, the company started acquiring distribution rights to African TV series in order to diversify its business. Azria then decided to sell, through his company, the South African series Jacob's Cross to Francophone African countries, and, years later, the Angolan telenovela Windeck to all of Africa, as well as France and the United States. The company's situation regarding local content began to change when Ivorien and Cameroonian channels started depending less on middleman companies and offered distribution contracts directly to producers. This led to the creation of Côte Ouest Production in 2016.

In May 2023, Mediawan acquired a majority stake in Côte Ouest for an undisclosed fee.
