= Nina Novelas =

- Country: France
- Broadcast area: France; Africa; Overseas France
- Headquarters: La Plaine Saint-Denis, France

Programming
- Languages: French; English
- Picture format: 1080i (HDTV); 576i (16:9 SDTV)

Ownership
- Owner: Mediawan Thematics (Côte Ouest Audiovisuel)

History
- Launched: 14 February 2015; 11 years ago (French); 27 July 2015; 11 years ago (English)
- Former names: Nina TV (2015-2018)

Links
- Website: www.nina-tv.com

Nina Novelas (formerly Nina TV) is a French-based pan-African television channel owned by Mediawan through its subsidiary Mediawan Thematics, in association with Côte Ouest Audiovisuel. The channel is available in two editions, a French channel available in both Africa and France and an English channel only in Africa. The content comes from Côte Ouest's back catalogue. Since 2017, a VOD service, MyNina, is also available.

== History ==
Côte Ouest launched the French-language Nina TV channel on 14 February 2015 (Valentine's Day) and was divided into six programming categories: Passion, Vengeance, Action, Teen, Culte and Africaine. Programming included telenovelas from African countries (Nigeria, Ghana, Kenya, South Africa, Angola, Ivory Coast) and Brazilian telenovelas from TV Globo's catalogue. Initially it was available only through the African ABSAT platform, before launching on MMDS networks. On 27 July of that year, a second channel in English opened.

In November 2017, Côte Ouest launched MyNina, the channel's VOD service. On 1 December, it launched on Cell-C's TV service Black.

StarTimes Kenya added the channel in March 2020. With the acquisition of Côte Ouest by Mediawan, it entered the French group's linear channel business as its first African channel.

The channel launched in the French Caribbean departments on SFR in 2024. At the time, the African telenovelas were spun off to a separate channel (Afro Novelas) and the programming categories were narrowed down to four: Novelas jeunes adultes, Novelas Action, Novelas Famille and Novelas Culte.

In July 2026, Nina Novelas launched on Can'L in New Caledonia.
