= Murder of Carol Stuart =

American murder

- Location: Boston, Massachusetts, U.S.
- Date: October 23, 1989
- Attack type: Murder by gunshot
- Victims: Carol Ann Stuart (30); Christopher William DiMaiti (17 days)
- Perpetrator: Charles Michael Stuart

On the night of October 23, 1989, 30-year-old Carol Ann Stuart (née DiMaiti; born March 26, 1959) was shot by her husband, Charles Michael "Chuck" Stuart Jr. (December 18, 1959 – January 4, 1990) in Boston, Massachusetts, U.S.; she died in the early hours of October 24. Charles Stuart falsely claimed that a black man had shot both him and Carol after a carjacking.

His statement to police set off a months-long manhunt by the Boston Police Department for a purported black assailant. Police actions, with widespread stop and frisk of African-American residents in Mission Hill, was supported by the Suffolk County District Attorney. The hunt lasted until Charles' younger brother, Matthew, confessed that Charles killed Carol to collect her life insurance payout. Soon afterward, Charles committed suicide.

The shooting occurred in Boston's predominantly black Mission Hill neighborhood, which had a high crime rate. It generated intense and sustained media attention both nationally and in Boston as an alleged example of black on white crime.Suffolk County District Attorney Newman A. Flanagan, who had supported the hoax of the killer being a black man and the actions of the police, later resigned.

Before the revelation of Charles as the killer, police arrested William "Willie" Bennett, a 39-year-old black man from Roxbury, on unrelated charges, and soon the investigation centered on Bennett. The media reported as though his guilt were certain.

== Murders ==
Cover of The Boston Herald on October 24, 1989, reporting the shooting as an attempted robbery of the couple

In 1989, Charles Stuart was the general manager at Edward F. Kakas & Sons, an upscale fur clothing shop on fashionable Newbury Street in Boston, Massachusetts. His wife, Carol, a tax attorney, was pregnant with their first child. They lived in a comfortable two-story house in suburban Reading. On October 23, the couple attended childbirth classes at Brigham and Women's Hospital and drove through Roxbury on their way home.

Stuart later told police that a young adult African-American gunman with a raspy voice and wearing a striped tracksuit forced his way into their Toyota Cressida at a stoplight, and ordered them to drive to nearby Mission Hill. There he robbed them, and shot Charles in the stomach and Carol in the head. Stuart said he managed to drive away and call the emergency number 9-1-1 on his car phone.

While on the phone with 9-1-1, Charles never mentioned that his wife was pregnant and never spoke to her directly during the call. Although he left the crime scene, he claimed he could not see street signs and did not know where he was. Gary McLaughlin, a state police dispatcher, found their car by telling responding police cars to shut off their sirens and then having them turn them back on, one by one, until dispatchers could hear the closest siren through Charles's phone.

On the night of the murder, the CBS reality television series Rescue 911 was riding with Boston Emergency Medical Services personnel. The crew took dramatic footage of the couple being extricated from the car and wheeled to the ambulance. Other footage included Stuart straining to speak with ambulance workers, and graphic scenes of his rushed entry to the hospital's emergency room.

Carol died at 2:50 a.m. on October 24 at Brigham & Women's Hospital. Before she died, doctors delivered her baby by caesarean section. Baptized in the intensive care unit, the baby was named Christopher William. Carol's funeral took place on October 28 at St. James Church in her hometown of Medford, Massachusetts. During the funeral, Brian Parsons, a friend of Charles, read a note that Charles had written in the hospital to his wife: ''Good night sweet wife, my love. God has called you to his side,'' it began. The note asked the public to forgive the murderer. The baby Christopher was nine weeks premature and had suffered trauma and oxygen deprivation due to the shooting; he died 17 days later. Both deaths were ruled homicides. A private funeral service was held for Christopher on November 20, 1989. Both Carol and Christopher were buried in Holy Cross Cemetery in Malden, Massachusetts, under Carol's maiden name, DiMaiti.

=== Investigation ===
Boston Police detectives Robert Ahearn and Robert Tinlin immediately suspected Stuart because he seemed too calm when recounting the shootings. They were overruled by their superiors, who pursued Stuart's description of the assailant. The case was assigned to lead detective Peter O’Malley.

During the manhunt, the city's police indiscriminately used controversial stop and frisk tactics on young black men, which heightened racial tensions. Suffolk County District Attorney Newman Flanagan called for reinstating the death penalty, which had been abolished in Massachusetts in 1984, a proposal that received some support in the state legislature.

In late October, the Boston Police arrested Alan "Albie" Swanson and his girlfriend Pamela Scott on a breaking and entering charge unrelated to the murders. Swanson became a suspect in the Stuart case after officers found newspaper clippings about the murder in his home and a black running suit soaking in his bathroom. Ultimately, the police concluded he had been too intoxicated to have committed the crime.

In mid-November, the police arrested William "Willie" Bennett in Burlington on a motor vehicle violation. Their suspicions of Bennett's involvement in the murders increased after finding a bullet in his mother's home that matched the caliber of the gun used in the murders. Two days later, on November 13, Bennett was charged with the robbery of a video store several weeks earlier.

Stuart, who was released from the hospital on December 5, identified Bennett as his attacker in a police lineup on December 28, 1989.

=== Confession ===
By early winter, the identity of the person who had murdered Carol Stuart and her unborn child had become an open secret. An analysis by the Boston Globe found that at least 33 people figured out or suspected the truth by the end of 1989.

Shortly after the new year, a group of Stuart siblings decided to meet with Charles's lawyer, Jack Dawley, so that Matthew Stuart, the youngest brother, could tell him what he was about to tell the police: the carjacking story was a hoax. On the evening of January 3, 1990, Matthew told the Boston police's homicide unit what he knew.

Matthew said that in mid-October, Charles had asked for his help with an insurance fraud scam where Matthew would "steal" Carol's jewelry from the Stuarts' house, and Charles would disguise the theft as a burglary and file a false insurance claim. When that plan went awry, Matthew said Charles asked him to help with a new plan: Charles told Matthew that he would stage a false holdup. They would afterwards rendezvous in Mission Hill on October 23 late at night, and Charles would throw a bag through the window of Matthew's car. Charles promised to pay Matthew $10,000 to get rid of the bag, which he would claim to the insurance company had been stolen. Matthew said he saw something slumped next to Charles in the passenger seat of Charles's car but could not make out what it was because the street was poorly lit.

After Charles threw Matthew the bag, which turned out to be Carol's Gucci purse, Matthew said he hid the purse temporarily in the Stuart family home. After discovering a .38 revolver, her engagement ring, and wallet, he asked his best friend, John "Jack" McMahon, to check the gun to see if it had been fired. When McMahon revealed that the gun had been fired three times, they panicked and threw Carol's purse off the Dizzy Bridge into the Pine River in their hometown of Revere, Massachusetts. Most of the items were later recovered by police.

Matthew claimed, and would continue to insist for the remainder of his life, that he did not know Charles intended to kill his pregnant wife. He also said that he did not know Carol had been murdered until he saw it reported on the television news the following day.

=== Suicide ===
The same evening that Matthew Stuart met with police, Charles met with his lawyer, Dawley, who dropped him as a client and reportedly told him he needed a criminal lawyer. After spending the night in a Sheraton hotel in Braintree, Charles abandoned his car on the Tobin Bridge in Chelsea around 7 a.m. on January 4, 1990, and jumped 135 feet to his death in the Mystic River. He left a suicide note in the car that read in part, "Whatever this new accusation is, it has beaten me." His body was recovered from the river later that day.

=== Missed leads ===
Matthew was not the only Stuart brother whom Charles tried to recruit in the fall of 1989. Two months before the murder, Charles approached his brother, Michael Stuart, and a high school friend, David MacLean, and asked them to help him cheat his insurance company. He also implied that he wanted them to help him kill his wife. Both of them refused. They later claimed that they did not fully understand what Charles was proposing until after the murder took place. David MacLean's brother, Michael "Dennis" MacLean, and his friend, John Carlson, later approached Sergeant Dan Grabowski on October 28, 1989, with information about Charles's possible role in Carol's murder. Grabowski did not pursue the lead, as it was hearsay without evidence.

They also shared their suspicions with Carlson's brother in law, who was a police officer. That officer passed the tip along to Boston Police detective Robert Ahearn, who earlier had doubted Charles Stuart's story. Ahearn made only a desultory effort to follow up.

=== Prosecution of accomplices ===
Shortly after the suicide, a grand jury investigating the murder of Carol Stuart was reconvened. The purpose was to learn whether or not other people participated in Carol Stuart's murder. Three witnesses testified that they saw someone resembling Matthew Stuart in the back seat of Charles's car on the night of the murders. However, they could not say for certain it was Matthew Stuart. Some doctors involved in Charles's care after the shooting said it was unlikely that his gunshot wound was self-inflicted; ballistic evidence suggested the same.

The Boston Globe, in its 2023 series and documentary on the murders, asked an independent forensic consultant, Lewis Gordon, whether Charles could have shot himself. “We just don’t have enough information to reach a conclusion one way or the other,” Gordon said.

In September 1991, Matthew Stuart was indicted on six charges, including conspiracy, obstruction of justice, unlawful possession of a firearm, compounding a felony, and insurance fraud. He was not charged with participating in the murder itself due to insufficient evidence. In November 1992, Matthew and the prosecution agreed to a plea bargain. He pleaded guilty to obstruction of justice and insurance fraud and the prosecution withdrew the remaining charges. He was sentenced to three to five years in prison.

In a separate case, his friend Jack McMahon was also indicted on multiple charges. In November 1992, he pleaded guilty to accessory after the fact of murder, unlawful possession of a firearm, conspiracy to impede and obstruct justice, and concealing stolen property. McMahon was sentenced to one to three years for assisting Matthew Stuart in disposing of the handgun that Charles Stuart used to kill his wife.

Released on parole in 1995, Matthew was arrested in May of 1997 for cocaine trafficking in Revere. He was returned to prison for a parole violation, but his attorney appealed the charges. Those charges were later dropped for lack of evidence. On September 3, 2011, Matthew was found dead of an apparent drug overdose in Heading Home, a homeless shelter in Cambridge, Massachusetts.

=== Possible motives ===
Over the course of a decade, Charles Stuart had risen from a short-order cook to a fur salon manager who made more than $100,000 a year. After his death, police and the media speculated that he may have been consumed by ambition and greed. He had spoken to several friends about needing money to open his own restaurant and he took a course on "Buying and Operating a Restaurant Successfully." He complained to his friend David MacLean that his wife refused to get an abortion and that he was worried she would not resume her career after the baby was born. There was also speculation that Charles was having an affair with a 22-year-old colleague, Deborah Allen, who visited him in the hospital and kept a journal for him chronicling "the things he was missing." Allen denied having an affair with Stuart and it was never proven otherwise.

In a New York Times article, Harvard psychologist Robert Coles described Stuart as "an extreme example of a psychopath, an antisocial personality with little sense of remorse, a propensity to lie and often an ability to deceive others into believing his fantasies." In most psychopaths, said Coles, "there is cruelty and callousness, but Stuart [outdid] that."

In January 1990, The Boston Globe's Mike Barnicle wrote that Prudential Financial had issued a check for $482,000 as the life insurance payout for Carol's policy. The New York Times later reported there was no such policy. Charles did receive $82,000 from a life insurance policy through Carol's law firm and had applied to collect $100,000 from a second life insurance policy with The Travelers Companies.

After his release from the hospital, Charles began spending money on a new Nissan Maxima car and women's jewelry, including diamond solitaire earrings and a gold brooch. "It struck me as funny, because why would he be shopping?" said the salesman who sold him the brooch. "He didn't express any grief at all."

== Lawsuits ==
Bennett was never charged in the murders of Carol Stuart and her unborn son Christopher. In October 1990, a jury found Bennett guilty of an armed robbery of a Brookline video store and three counts of assault with a dangerous weapon. He was sentenced to 12 to 25 years in prison and was released in 2002.

After a lengthy lawsuit against the city and its police department for treatment of Bennett during the Stuart affair, Bennett's family was awarded $12,500 in damages, according to the Boston Globe. As of 2023, Bennett was reportedly living alone in Boston and suffering from dementia.

In September 2025, the city settled another lawsuit, with the family of Bennett receiving $100,000 and with Bennett himself receiving $50,000.

== City apologies ==
On January 5, 1990, the day after Charles Stuart committed suicide, District Attorney Newman Flanagan said Willie Bennett was no longer a suspect in the murder investigation. That night, Boston Mayor Raymond Flynn stopped by the Bennetts’ home in Mission Hill to privately apologize on behalf of the city.

In public apology on behalf of the city, Boston Mayor Michelle Wu formally apologized on December 20, 2023, for the investigation's negative treatment of Boston's African-American community, especially in Mission Hill. Her apology was also directly addressed to Bennett and Swanson. "What was done to you," Wu said, "was unjust, unfair, racist and wrong." Swanson and members of Bennett's family attended Wu's press conference.

== Memorial fund ==
In Carol DiMaiti's memory, her family established the Carol DiMaiti Stuart Foundation to provide scholarships to Mission Hill residents and Malden High School graduates. The foundation helped students who showed leadership ability and had significant financial need, and provided recipients with mentors and summer internships. One of the beneficiaries was the daughter of William Bennett, the man falsely accused of Carol's murder. By early 2006, the foundation had awarded $1.2 million to 220 students. The DiMaitis' attorney and family spokesman, Marvin Geller, told the press: "Carol would not want to be remembered as the victim of a sensational murder, but rather as a woman who left behind a legacy of healing and compassion."

== In popular culture ==
CBS broadcast a TV docudrama film Goodnight Sweet Wife: A Murder in Boston in 1990, based on what was known of events prior to the murder, the police and media investigations, and their aftermath.

The 1991 song "Wildside" by Marky Mark and the Funky Bunch refers to the case.

The Stuart case is mentioned in Gone Baby Gone (1998), the fourth novel of Dennis Lehane's Kenzie and Gennaro series. It is also referred to in Robert B. Parker's novel Small Vices (1997); at one point, protagonist Spenser, a private investigator, muses that he would have suspected at once that Stuart had "murdered his wife and wounded himself badly to cover it up."

The documentary TV series City Confidential covers the Stuart murder in its December 2000 episode titled "Boston: Betrayal in Beantown".

American poet Cornelius Eady ends his 2001 poem "COMPOSITE" with a summary of this case.

The 2002 documentary Bowling for Columbine refers to the case as contributing to false racial fears that drive gun ownership in the United States.

Puerto Rican poet Martín Espada alludes to the case in his 2018 poem "Jumping Off the Mystic Tobin Bridge."

The HBO documentary series Murder in Boston: Roots, Rampage, and Reckoning (2023), directed by Jason Hehir and co-produced by The Boston Globe, presents the results of a two-year re-investigation and retrospective of the case.

== See also ==
- Jesse Anderson, who killed his wife in 1992 and claimed a racial hoax
