= Jason Hehir =

American film director and producer

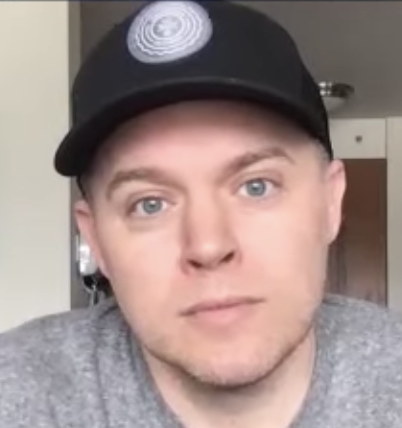
- Hehir in 2020
- Occupations: Director, producer
- Years active: 2001–present

Jason Hehir is an American film director and producer. Hehir has directed André the Giant (2018), The Last Dance (2020), Countdown: Inspiration4 Mission to Space (2021), Murder in Boston: Roots, Rampage, and Reckoning (2023), Return of the King: The Fall and Rise of Elvis Presley (2024), Novak Djokovic: The Wolf in Winter (2026), (Note: In the documentary's official title, its associated promotional materials, and all on-screen references to Djokovic, his name is rendered as Novak Djoković.) and SCTV: The Greatest Show You've Never Heard Of (2026).

== Early life ==
Hehir attended Newton North High School. He also attended Williams College.

== Career ==
Hehir previously served as a production intern for NBC Sports, Initially wanting to be a sports anchor, Hehir met Bob Costas, who asked him to move to HBO, where he served as an associate producer on On the Record with Bob Costas, and worked with HBO Sports.

In 2018, Hehir directed André the Giant for HBO, The documentary was one of the most watched in HBO's history.

In 2020, Hehir directed The Last Dance, a documentary series for ESPN and Netflix, revolving around the career of Michael Jordan. The series received critical acclaim, winning the Primetime Emmy Award for Outstanding Documentary or Nonfiction Series.

In 2021, Hehir directed Countdown: Inspiration4 Mission to Space a documentary series revolving around the SpaceX Inspiration 4 orbital mission for Netflix. That same year, Hehir founded the production company Little Room Films.

In 2023, Hehir directed and produced Murder in Boston: Roots, Rampage, and Reckoning a documentary series revolving around the Murder of Carol Stuart for HBO.

In 2026, Novak Djokovic: The Wolf in Winter, directed by Hehir, debuted on Prime Video.
