= Connor Schell =

American film and television producer

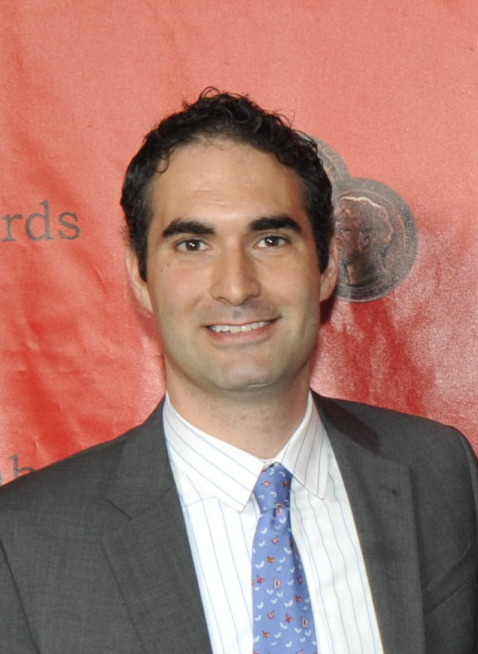
- Schell at the 70th Annual Peabody Awards
- Education: Harvard University (BA); Columbia University (MA)
- Occupations: Film and television producer
- Employer: Words + Pictures
- Board member of: Peabody Awards
- Children: 3

Connor Schell is an American film and television producer and the founder of the non-fiction production studio Words + Pictures. He is the co-creator with Bill Simmons and executive producer of the 30 for 30 series for ESPN. Schell was also an executive producer of the Academy Award-winning documentary film O.J.: Made in America and the Emmy Award-winning miniseries The Last Dance.

== Education and personal life ==
Schell holds a Bachelor of Arts Degree in History from Harvard University and a Master's in Business Administration (with a focus in Media and Entertainment) from Columbia Business School.

He lives in New York, and is married with three children.

== Career ==
Until early 2021, Schell was executive vice president and head of content at ESPN. At ESPN, he oversaw the production of the NFL draft, the College Football National Championship game, Wimbledon, the NBA Finals, and shows like College Gameday and SportsCenter. He is a member of the Peabody Awards board of directors and was inducted into the Sports Business Journal's 40 Under 40 Hall of Fame in 2017 when he made the list for the third time, first in 2012 and again in 2016.

Schell left ESPN to start a joint venture with Chernin Entertainment, founding the non-fiction production studio Words + Pictures in 2021. Under the Words + Pictures banner, Schell has executive produced docuseries and films like Super League: The War for Football and the Christopher Reeve documentary film Super/Man: The Christopher Reeve Story (2024).

In 2021, Schell and Chernin launched Full Day to focus on live entertainment, specials, and unscripted series such as The ESPYS and NFL Honors, as well as The Netflix Cup, the platform's first-ever live sports event.

In 2022, Words + Pictures acquired Hock Films, producers of films such as The Best That Never Was, Survive and Advance, Celtics/Lakers: Best of Enemies, and Of Miracles and Men.

In 2022, Schell sold Words + Pictures to Peter Chernin's The North Road Company. Schell currently sits on The North Road Company's Board of Directors.

== Films ==
As part of Words + Pictures, Schell executive produced Jeen-yuhs: A Kanye Trilogy on Netflix and executive produced the documentary film Super/Man: The Christopher Reeve Story (2024) about Christopher Reeve.

Connor is a producer of the 2016 documentary film O.J.: Made in America along with Ezra Edelman, Caroline Waterlow, Libby Geist, Tamara Rosenberg and Nina Krstic. O.J.: Made in America premiered on ABC on June 11, 2016. The film won an Oscar, a Peabody Award, and Best Documentary honors at the Gotham Awards, the Independent Spirit Awards, the IDA Awards, the Producer's Guild Awards, National Board of Review, and NY Film Critics. OJ: Made in America was honored with special recognition from the AFI and a Dupont Award for Journalism. The documentary originated from conversations between Schell and Edelman in early 2014, and is the longest film ever to win an Oscar. The film was also nominated for six Primetime Emmy Awards.

Along with Bill Simmons, Mark Ciardi, Gordon Gray and Joe Roth, Connor served as an Executive Producer of the 2014 Disney film Million Dollar Arm.

Schell served as an Executive Producer for the 2016 Disney film Queen of Katwe, the first Disney film on which ESPN Films has a presentation credit.

== Television production ==
Schell is an executive producer of the Emmy Award-winning 10-part docuseries The Last Dance. The Last Dance was a weekly series on ESPN from April 19, 2020, through May 17, 2020, at the height of the COVID-19 pandemic and when all live sports were suspended indefinitely. The series won the Primetime Emmy Award for Outstanding Documentary or Nonfiction Series at the 72nd Primetime Emmy Awards and was the most watched "30 for 30" in ESPN history.

As part of Words + Pictures, Schell executive produced Countdown: Inspiration4 Mission to Space, a real-time chronicle of Inspiration4, the historic SpaceX Dragon mission that launched four civilians into space. He also executive produced the docuseries Super League: The War for Football. Schell is currently executive producing an upcoming eight-part documentary on the Yankees dynasty, entitled The Yankees Win, as well as a series on the U.S. Women's National Team's journey to the World Cup and series on NASCAR.

Under Schell's company Full Day, Schell oversees the annual productions of the Oscars Red Carpet show, the Savage X Fenty fashion show, the NFL Honors, as well as the upcoming live show The Netflix Cup.

In 2014, the Disney XD channel premiered the series Becoming which was created by Schell, Bill Simmons, Erin Leyden and Gentry Kirby. Becoming is a series of 30-minute documentaries profiling athletes such as LeBron James, Alex Morgan, Tim Howard, Henrik Lundqvist, Chris Paul and CC Sabathia. The show is executive produced by Schell and Simmons along with Libby Geist, Maverick Carter and LeBron James.

Working with Maura Mandt and MaggieVision productions, Schell is the executive producer of the annual ESPY Awards on ABC. He has been the executive producer of the show since 2013.

In 2008, Schell was an Executive Producer on Dan Klores' four-hour film Black Magic, the first film to run under the ESPN Films brand. Black Magic won a Peabody Award in 2008.

The 30 for 30 series, created by Schell and Bill Simmons, was created in 2007 and has aired since 2009. It has won four Emmy Awards and a Peabody Award. In 2012, Simmons and Schell announced the creation of 30 for 30 shorts.
