= Murder in Boston: Roots, Rampage, and Reckoning =

- Directed by: Jason Hehir
- Music by: Lucia Micarelli; Thomas Caffey
- Country of origin: United States
- Original language: English
- No. of episodes: 3

Production
- Executive producers: Joie Jacoby; Linda Pizzuti Henry; Dan Krockmalnic; Nancy Abraham; Lisa Heller; Sara Rodriguez
- Producers: Jason Hehir; Jake Rogal; Nicholas Eisenberg; Jillian Moossmann
- Cinematography: Thomas McCallum; Alastair Christopher; Enver Perez; Michael Rotiroti; Thomas Stukas; Jovan Tanasijevic
- Editors: Ross Hockrow; Nikolai Johnson
- Running time: 50-54 minutes
- Production companies: HBO Documentary Films; The Boston Globe; Little Room Films

Original release
- Network: HBO
- Release: December 4 – December 18, 2023

Murder in Boston: Roots, Rampage and Reckoning is a 2023 television documentary series directed and produced by Jason Hehir. It follows the murder of Carol Stuart, and the investigation that followed, igniting racial tensions and targeting.

It premiered on December 4, 2023, on HBO.

== Premise ==
The series explores the murder of Carol Stuart, and the investigation that followed, which ignited racial tensions and targeting, becoming a media firestorm. Ron Bell, Dart Adams, David Ropeik, Adrian Walker, Louis Elisa, Howard Bryant, Michelle Caruso, Ted Landsmark, William Bratton, Brian McGrory, Neil Sullivan, Tito Jackson, Jeffrey Brown, Kevin Patterson, and Nancy Gertner appear in the series.

== Episodes ==
No.	Title	Directed by	Original release date
1	"Roots"	Jason Hehir	December 4, 2023
2	"Rampage"	Jason Hehir	December 11, 2023
3	"Reckoning"	Jason Hehir	December 18, 2023

== Production ==
As a teenager, Jason Hehir had heard about the murder of Carol Stuart daily, eventually wanting to make a documentary about it, exploring Boston's racial history through the lens of the case. Carol's family declined to participate in the series, while the Bennett family was initially skeptical and reluctant to trust Hehir, eventually doing so. Hehir spent time with the family, and let them know he would portray their story accurately and honestly.

The Boston Globe co-produced the series, additionally producing a companion podcast based upon extensive reporting.

== Reception ==
On the review aggregator website Rotten Tomatoes, 100% of 5 critics' reviews are positive, with an average rating of 7.00/10. On Metacritic, the series has a weighted average score of 80 out of 100, based on 4 critics, indicating "generally favorable".

Kristen Baldwin of Entertainment Weekly wrote: "Gives voice to the people who were unjustly victimized by law enforcement and examines the legacy of a painful, racist rush to judgment." John Anderson of The Wall Street Journal wrote: "A captivating crime story, a socio-political treatise and even evidence that life can get better."
