= Kinetic Content =

American television production company

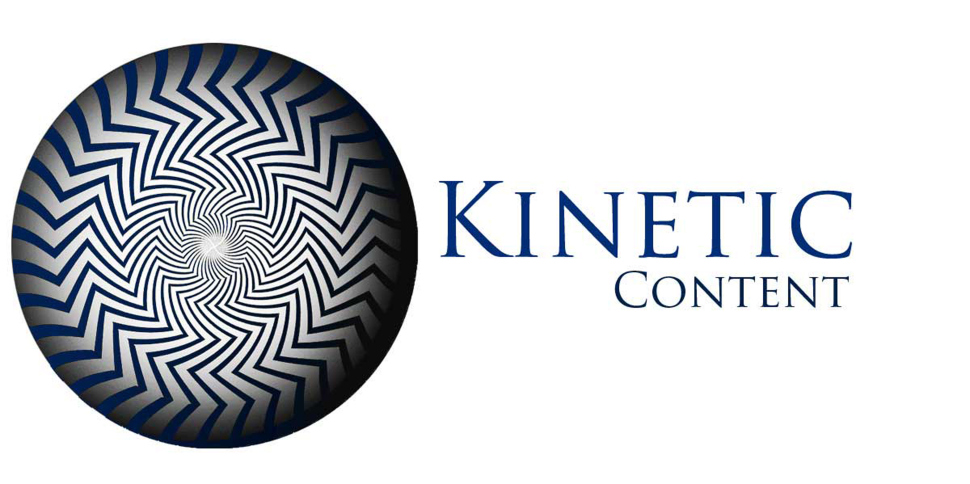
- Type: Subsidiary
- Industry: Television production
- Founded: 2010; 16 years ago
- Founder: Chris Coelen
- Headquarters: Los Angeles, California, United States
- Area served: Nationwide
- Parent: Red Arrow Studios (2010–2022); The North Road Company (2022–present)
- Divisions: Kinetic UK
- Website: kineticcontent.com

Kinetic Content is an American television production company launched in 2010 that creates and produces content on a global scale. Led by founder and CEO Chris Coelen, Kinetic has been part of Peter Chernin's The North Road Company, since June 2022.

Kinetic series include the global Netflix series Love Is Blind The Ultimatum and Perfect Match; the series Married at First Sight, which ranks as Lifetime's number one series; Claim to Fame for ABC/Hulu and Love Without Borders for Bravo. Kinetic's upcoming slate features projects for numerous networks including Netflix, Amazon, Peacock, ABC/Hulu, Bravo, and Max.

In September 2010, German entertainment & distribution company Red Arrow Entertainment Group had announced that they have acquired a 51% majority stake in Los Angeles-based American production company Kinetic Content, with Kinetic Content became a subsidiary of Red Arrow Entertainment Group.

However twelve years later in July 2022 when Peter Chernin announced that he established a global independent and production content studio that would bring his film & television production company Chernin Entertainment and its unscripted production studio Words + Pictures entitled The North Road Company and the two subsidiaries became part of his new company as labels, Kinetic Content's German entertainment & international distribution parent company Red Arrow Studios exited the American television production industry had sold its American entertainment production operations including Kinetic Content to Peter Chernin's new global studio The North Road Company had brought the US assets of German entertainment & international distribution company Red Arrow Studios from ProSiebenSat.1 Media including Kinetic Content as it became a subsidiary of Chernin's new global content company The North Road Company while Kinetic Content's founder & CEO Chris Coelen continued to lead Kinetic Content under North Road, while its newly established international division North Road Intetnational (which is based in London, England) had taken over Kinetic Content's programming catalogue and would distribute Kinetic Content's future productions

In February 2025, Kinetic Content expanded its production activities into the UK production market by establishing its British production division entitled Kinetic UK and had appointed former Monkey Kingdom creative director and Too Hot to Handle co-creator Laura Gibson to lead Kinetic Content's British production division Kinetic UK as its managing director while the new British production division would produce British adaptations of Kinetic Content's franchises such as Love is Blind for the UK market. One month later in March of that year, Kinetic Content's British production division Kinetic UK had announced that former Multistory Media chief creative officer Ana De Moraes had joined Kinetic Content's British production division Kinetic UK as its creative director of Kinetic Content's newly established British production division.

In January 2026, French media entertainment company Mediawan had entered advanced talks to acquire Kinetic Content including its British production division Kinetic UK alongside its American global entertainment & production content studio and parent The North Road Company alongside its international division North Road International their scripted & unscripted entertainment production subsidiary Chernin Entertainment, minority investment stakes in Omaha Productions and Two One Five Entertainment, Turkish/American drama production company Karga Seven Pictures, Mexican scripted television studio Perro Azul and its unscripted production operations which were Left/Right, Words + Pictures (including Little Room Films) and 44 Blue Productions from its founder Peter Chernin that would expand Mediawan's American production operations and the planned acquisition of North Road would lead Mediawan's entry into the Turkish and Latin American production operations.

== Programming ==
Kinetic Content primarily produces non-scripted content, but recently announced its new endeavor into the scripted programming in 2020. Kinetic is known for its TV franchises and spin-offs, including Married at First Sight, Love Is Blind, and the Little Women franchise.

== Awards and nominations ==
Year	Nominee / work	Award	Result
2019	Married at First Sight	Critics' Choice Award for Best Relationship Show	Won
2020	Love Is Blind	Critics' Choice Award for Best Relationship Show	Won
2020	Love Is Blind	Grierson Award for Best Entertaining Documentary	Nominated
2020	Love Is Blind	Emmy for Outstanding Structured Reality Program	Nominated
2020	Love Is Blind	Emmy for Outstanding Casting for a Reality Program	Nominated
2022	The Ultimatum	Critics' Choice Award for Best Relationship Show	Nominated
2022	Love Is Blind	Critics' Choice Award for Best Relationship Show	Won
2022	Love Is Blind	Emmy for Outstanding Structured Reality Program	Nominated
2023	Love Is Blind	Critics' Choice Award for Best Relationship Show	Won
2023	Love Is Blind	Emmy for Outstanding Structured Reality Program	Nominated
2023	Love Is Blind	Emmy for Outstanding Casting for a Reality Program	Nominated

== Shows ==
Shows by Kinetic Content
Title	First aired	Latest season premiere	Current season
Love Is Blind	February 13, 2020	Present	5
The Ultimatum: Marry or Move On	April 16, 2022	Present	2
Married at First Sight	July 8, 2014	Present	16
Perfect Match	February 14, 2023	Present	1
The Ultimatum: Queer Love	May 24, 2023	Present	1
Claim to Fame	July 11, 2022	Present	2
The Ride	May 30, 2023	Present	1
Little Women: LA	May 27, 2014	August 15, 2019	8
Little Women: Atlanta	January 27, 2016	March 26, 2021	6
Little Women: Dallas	November 2, 2016	May 17, 2017	1
Little Women: NY	March 25, 2015	June 15, 2016	2
Love Without Borders	November 30, 2022	February 1, 2023	1
The Friends Speak	December 8, 2019	Present	1
Man vs. Bear	December 4, 2019	January 1, 2020	1
Spy Games	January 20, 2020	Present	1
Buying it Blind	November 2, 2018	Present	1
Seven Year Switch	March 15, 2016	Present	2
Married at First Sight: Couples Cam	February 4, 2021	Present	2
The Taste	January 22, 2013	January 22, 2015	3
Betty White's Off their Rockers	January 16, 2012	September 12, 2017	3
Man vs. Child: Chef Showdown	July 23, 2015	August 25, 2016	2
Little Women: Couples Retreat	July 26, 2017	September 13, 2017	1
What Now?	May 21, 2019	June 4, 2019	1
Married at First Sight: Jamie and Doug Plus One	December 19, 2017	January 9, 2018	1
The Story of Us	May 22, 2018	May 22, 2018	1
Spouse House	July 19, 2017	September 10, 2017	1
Married at First Sight: Happily Ever After?	October 30, 2018	December 18, 2018	1
Married at First Sight: Second Chances	April 27, 2017	July 13, 2017	1
