= List of people from Miami =

The following is a list of notable people who were born or who live or formerly lived in the city of Miami, Florida.

== Artists and designers ==
- Jorge Arango (1917–2007), Colombia-born architect
- Natalia Arbelaez (born 1983), ceramicist, educator, born in Miami
- Hernan Bas (born 1978), visual artist
- Jonathan Crenshaw (1972–2023), armless, homeless street painter
- Clandestine Culture, contemporary artist
- Kat Reeder, Peruvian-born illustrator, graphic designer, and artist
- Arturo Rodríguez (born 1956), Cuban-born painter
- Cesar Santos (born 1982), Cuban-born painter
- Sebastian Spreng (born 1956), visual artist and journalist
- Robert Law Weed, architect
- Purvis Young (1943–2010), painter

== Authors, writers, and journalists ==
- T. D. Allman (1944–2024), foreign correspondent, historian
- Dave Barry (born 1947), columnist and humorist
- James Carlos Blake (born 1947), fiction writer and essayist
- Edna Buchanan (born 1939), novelist and Miami journalist (born in Paterson, New Jersey)
- Daína Chaviano (born 1957), author of historical, sci-fi & fantasy novels, born in Havana (Cuba)
- Patricia Cornwell (born 1956), novelist
- Reed Cowan (born 1972), journalist
- Jennine Capó Crucet, novelist, essayist, short story writer
- Marjory Stoneman Douglas (1890–1998), conservationist and writer of fiction and non-fiction
- Eric Garcia, writer whose Matchstick Men was adapted into a movie
- Lillian Glass (born 1952), body-language expert, author, columnist, TV commentator
- Thomas Harris (born 1940), author of novels featuring Hannibal Lecter
- Carl Hiaasen (born 1953), novelist and former Miami Herald columnist, originally from Plantation, Florida
- Dan Le Batard (born 1968), columnist and sports radio host
- Jeff Lindsay (born 1952), author of novels featuring Dexter Morgan
- Tom Llamas (born 1979), ABC and NBC News correspondent
- Kirk Munroe (1850–1930), author of children's books
- Chris Myers, sportscaster and host of The Chris Myers Interview
- Ferdie Pacheco (1927–2017), Muhammad Ali's cornerman and doctor, TV commentator, artist, writer
- Amy Serrano (born 1966), poet, essayist, author, filmmaker

== Actors and entertainers ==
- Somy Ali (born 1976), former Bollywood actress, writer, model, filmmaker and activist
- Diora Baird (born 1983), actress and former model
- Esther Baxter (born 1984), actress
- Garcelle Beauvais (born 1966), actress in The Jamie Foxx Show, NYPD Blue, The Real Housewives of Beverly Hills, actress (born in Haiti but grew up in Miami)
- Jack Betts (born 1929), actor
- Paul Bouche, TV host and producer of A Oscuras Pero Encendidos
- Jencarlos Canela (born 1988), Cuban-American actor/singer/songwriter
- Noah Centineo (born 1996), actor, To All the Boys I've Loved Before and Black Adam
- Matt Cohen, South of Nowhere
- Abella Danger (born 1995), pornographic actress and model
- Joshua Day, model
- Cote de Pablo (born 1979), actress, NCIS (born in Chile but grew up in Miami)
- Patricia Delgado, ballet dancer
- Gail Edwards (born 1952), actress, It's a Living, Full House, Blossom
- Michael Flessas (born 1959), Cannes Film Festival Palme d'Or (Golden Palm)-winning film Dancer in the Dark
- Brandon Flynn (born 1993), actor, 13 Reasons Why and Hellraiser
- Andy García (born 1956), born in Cuba, moved to the United States at age 5
- Yani Gellman (born 1985), actor, The Lizzie McGuire Movie
- Lynda Goodfriend (born 1953), actress
- Marcello Hernández (born 1997), stand-up comedian and actor
- Pat Hingle (1924–2009), actor
- Nick Hogan (born 1990), actor, reality television personality, son of Hulk Hogan
- Adam Irigoyen (born 1997), actor, Shake It Up
- Oscar Isaac (born 1979), actor, Inside Llewyn Davis, Star Wars sequel trilogy, Moon Knight
- Victoria Jackson (born 1959), former Saturday Night Live cast member
- Blake Jenner (born 1992), actor in Glee and Everybody Wants Some
- Barry Jenkins (born 1979), filmmaker; Moonlight
- Dwayne "The Rock" Johnson (born 1972), actor, wrestler and former University of Miami defensive end
- Lawrence Kasdan (born 1949), co-writer, Raiders of the Lost Ark, The Empire Strikes Back, Return of the Jedi, Star Wars: The Force Awakens and Solo: A Star Wars Story
- Catherine Keener (born 1959), Academy Award-nominated actress
- Veronica Lake (1922–1973), film, stage, and television actress
- Cris Lankenau (born 1981), actor
- Monica Lopera (born 1985), actress
- Phil Lord (born 1975), director and writer of Cloudy with a Chance of Meatballs, 21 Jump Street, and The Lego Movie; executive producer of Storks and Smallfoot
- Josie Loren (born 1987), Make It or Break It
- William H. Macy (born 1950), actor, Academy Award-nominated for Fargo
- Kristin Minter (born 1965), model and actress from Home Alone and ER
- Julio Oscar Mechoso (1955–2017), The Legend of Zorro
- Camila Mendes (born 1994), American-Brazilian actress, Riverdale
- Eva Mendes (born 1974), actress
- E. Roger Mitchell (born 1971), actor
- María Antonieta de las Nieves (born 1949), actress known for El Chavo del Ocho (currently lives in Miami)
- Vivian Nixon (born 1984), actress and dancer
- Alexa PenaVega (born 1988), actress in Spy Kids and Repo! The Genetic Opera
- Danny Pino (born 1974), actor in Cold Case, Law & Order: Special Victims Unit and Dear Evan Hansen
- Larsa Pippen (born 1974), reality television personality, socialite, and businesswoman, The Real Housewives of Miami
- Sidney Poitier (1927–2022), Academy Award-winning actor; Guess Who's Coming to Dinner? and In the Heat of the Night
- Yvette Prieto (born 1978), model for designer Alexander Wang
- Nathalia Ramos (born 1992), Spanish-Australian-American actress (born in Spain but once lived in Miami)
- Riley Reid (born 1991), pornographic actress
- Genesis Rodriguez (born 1987), actress
- Roxie Roker (1929–1995), actress in The Jeffersons
- Mickey Rourke (born 1952), actor, Moved to Miami Beach aged 6, graduated from Miami Beach Senior High School in 1971
- Christian Slater (born 1969), actor in Heathers (lives in New York City and Miami)
- Stugotz (born 1972), radio host of The Dan Le Batard Show with Stugotz on ESPN Radio, current resident of Miami
- Anya Taylor-Joy (born 1996), actress, born in Miami
- Philip Michael Thomas (born 1949), Miami Vice
- Wilmer Valderrama (born 1980), That '70s Show, Yo Momma, NCIS
- Ben Vereen (born 1946), actor and entertainer
- Sofia Vergara (born 1972), actress and model, Modern Family
- Lulu Wang (born 1983), filmmaker
- Persia White (born 1972), Girlfriends
- Pharrell Williams (born 1973), singer-songwriter, producer, rapper and film producer
- Dave Williamson, stand-up comedian

== Business ==
- Benjamin Breier, president, chief executive officer and member of the board of directors for Kindred Healthcare
- Terri Dial (1949–2012), former leader of Citigroup's North American consumer banking business
- Jorge Mas (born 1963), sporting executive and chairman of MasTec and the Cuban American National Foundation
- Blake Ross (born 1985), co-founder of Mozilla Firefox

== Criminals ==
- Paul Bilzerian (born 1950), financier convicted of securities fraud
- William Calley (1943–2024), war criminal
- Al Capone (1899–1947), infamous Chicago mobster
- Adolfo Constanzo (1962–1989), Cuban-American serial killer
- Jeffrey Dahmer (1960–1994), serial killer
- Jeffrey Feltner (1962–1993), serial killer
- Jonathan James (1983–2008), youngest person ever to be incarcerated for cybercrime in the United States

== Musicians and singers ==
- Steve Aoki (born 1977), DJ
- David Archuleta (born 1990), singer
- Giselle Bellas, singer-songwriter
- Booba (born 1976), rapper
- Brisco (born 1982), rapper
- Camila Cabello (born 1997), former member of Fifth Harmony, born in Cuba, relocated to the US at age 5
- Tego Calderón (born 1972), rapper, born in Puerto Rico, moved to and attended high school in Miami
- Luther Campbell (born 1960), rapper, aka Luke, former leader of 2 Live Crew
- Harry Wayne Casey (born 1951), better known as "KC" of KC and the Sunshine Band
- Willy Chirino (born 1947), salsa singer
- City Girls, rap group
- Phil Collins (born 1951), singer-songwriter, multi-instrumentalist, record producer, and actor, lives in Miami
- Cool and Dre, team of hip-hop producers
- Celia Cruz (1925–2003), salsa music singer
- Denzel Curry (born 1995), rapper
- Kat Dahlia (born 1990), rapper
- Christian Daniel (born 1984), singer-songwriter and actor, moved to Miami in 2007
- DaniLeigh (born 1994), singer
- Craig David (born 1981), British singer
- Jason Derulo (born 1989), singer-songwriter
- DJ Craze (born 1977), Nicaraguan American, only DJ in history to win three consecutive World DMC Champion titles
- DJ Khaled (born 1975), rapper, born in New Orleans but raised and lives in Miami
- DJ Laz (born 1971), rapper, DJ
- DJ Uncle Al (1969–2001), local hip hop DJ
- Dunk Ryders, rap group
- Gloria Estefan (born 1957), Latin pop singer-songwriter
- Expose, freestyle group
- Flo Rida (born 1979), rapper
- Sage Francis (born 1976), alternative hip hop artist
- Barry Gibb (born 1946), lead vocalist in Bee Gees
- Maurice Gibb (1949–2003), musician in Bee Gees
- Deborah Harry (born 1945), singer of Blondie
- Brooke Hogan (born 1988), pop and R&B singer; daughter of Hulk Hogan
- Ace Hood (born 1988), rapper
- I Set My Friends on Fire, post-hardcore band
- Enrique Iglesias (born 1975), Spanish singer-songwriter
- Julio Iglesias (born 1943), Latin artist
- Iron & Wine, folk rock singer-songwriter
- Jacki-O (born 1976), rapper
- Lauren Jauregui (born 1996), singer-songwriter, former member of Fifth Harmony
- JT Money (born 1972), rapper
- Victoria Justice (born 1993), actress and singer
- Sean Kingston (born 1990), singer and rapper
- Lil Pump (born 2000), rapper (real name: Gazzy Garcia)
- Jennifer Lopez (born 1969), singer
- LunchMoney Lewis (born 1987), singer
- Yngwie Malmsteen (born 1963), Swedish-born heavy metal guitarist, now resides in Miami with his family
- Maluma (born 1994), Colombian singer living in Miami
- Ky-Mani Marley (born 1976), reggae singer, actor, son of Bob Marley
- Ricky Martin (born 1971), Latin pop singer
- ¡Mayday!, rap group signed to Strange Music
- MC Jin (born 1982), rapper and actor
- George McCrae (born 1944), soul music singer
- Syesha Mercado (born 1987), singer-songwriter, actress and model
- Samuel David Moore (born 1935), of Sam & Dave
- Damien Moyal (born 1976), singer and musician
- Brianna Perry (born 1992), rapper and actress, originating from Miami-Dade County
- Pitbull (born 1981), Cuban-American rapper who mentions "Dade County" in several songs
- Pleasure P (born 1984), singer
- Poison Clan, rap group
- Iggy Pop (born 1947), singer-songwriter, musician, record producer, and actor, born in Muskegon, but lives in Miami
- Pretty Ricky, rap and R&B group
- Red Spyda (born 1975), producer, hip-hop R&B
- Rick Ross (born 1976), rapper
- Paulina Rubio (born 1971), Mexican Latin pop singer
- Santaye, singer-songwriter
- Jon Secada (born 1961), singer-songwriter, Latin pop singer
- Shakira (born 1977), Colombian singer, and songwriter
- Smitty (born 1979), rapper
- Smokepurpp (born 1997), rapper born in Chicago but grew up in Miami
- Frida Sofía (born 1992), Mexican-born singer-songwriter, media personality and fashion model
- Spaceghostpurrp (born 1991), rapper
- Stevie B (born 1958), freestyle music singer
- Stitches (born 1995), rapper
- Jessica Sutta (born 1982), of the girl group Pussycat Dolls
- Malu Trevejo (born 2002), Cuban-born singer
- Trick Daddy (born 1973), rapper
- Trina (born 1978), rapper
- Will to Power, freestyle group
- Marion Williams (1927–1994), gospel music singer
- Betty Wright (1953–2020), Grammy Award-winning singer-songwriter

== Politicians, honor civil servants, and activists ==
- Victor Agosto (born 1985), anti-war activist
- G. Holmes Braddock (1925–2025), politician
- George P. Bush (born 1976), Texas General Land Office commissioner
- Jeb Bush (born 1953), politician, 43rd governor of Florida
- Kathy Castor (born 1966), U.S. representative for Florida
- Mattie Belle Davis, judge
- Mario Díaz-Balart (born 1961), U.S. representative, former Florida senator and Florida representative
- Anitere Flores (born 1976), politician
- Carlos A. Giménez (born 1954), U.S. representative and former mayor of Miami-Dade County
- Renita Holmes, housing activist
- Carlos López-Cantera (born 1973), politician
- Scott James Meyer, attorney and former stand-up comedian
- Yeshimabeit Milner, technologist and activist
- Daniel Noboa (born 1987), 48th president of Ecuador
- Ileana Ros-Lehtinen (born 1952), U.S. representative
- Marco Rubio (born 1971), U.S. senator for Florida and U.S. secretary of state
- María Elvira Salazar (born 1961), U.S. representative and journalist
- Francis Suarez (born 1977), 43rd mayor of Miami
- Robert H. Traurig (1925–2018), co-founder of Greenberg Traurig.
- James Watt (1944–2025), member of the Florida House of Representatives
- Frederica Wilson (born 1942), U.S. representative

== Sports ==
=== Autoracing ===
- Bobby Allison (1937–2024) and family, NASCAR drivers
- Zach Banks (born 1997), racing driver
- Enzo Fittipaldi (born 2001), Formula 3 driver
- Pietro Fittipaldi (born 1996), Indycar and Formula One driver
- Bobby Johns (1932–2016), NASCAR driver
- Tony Kanaan (born 1974), 2013 Indianapolis 500 Champion, 2004 IndyCar Series Champion and 2015 Rolex 24 Hours at Daytona overall winner
- Juan Pablo Montoya (born 1975), 2000 and 2015 Indianapolis 500 Champion and Formula One racing driver
- Carlos Munoz (born 1992), IndyCar Series racing driver

=== Baseball ===
- Robert Andino (born 1984), current MLB baseball player for the Baltimore Orioles
- J. P. Arencibia (born 1986), former MLB catcher for the Toronto Blue Jays
- Ray Bare (1949–1994), former MLB pitcher for the St. Louis Cardinals and Detroit Tigers
- Andy Barkett (born 1974), former MLB player for the Pittsburgh Pirates and current manager of the Class AA Jacksonville Suns
- Rick Behenna (1960–2012), former MLB pitcher for the Atlanta Braves and Cleveland Indians
- Brian Buchanan (born 1973), former MLB outfielder for the Minnesota Twins, San Diego Padres and New York Mets
- José Canseco (born 1964), former baseball player (born in Cuba, moved to Miami as an infant)
- Steve Carlton (born 1944), Hall of Fame baseball player
- Alex Castellanos (born 1986), current MLB outfielder for the New York Mets
- Vinnie Chulk (born 1978), current MLB relief pitcher for the Milwaukee Brewers
- Andre Dawson (born 1954), former MLB outfielder
- Lenny DiNardo (born 1979), MLB pitcher for the Boston Red Sox, Oakland Athletics and Kansas City Royals
- Joe Dunand (born 1995), MLB player
- Tal Erel (born 1996), Israel national baseball team player
- Jorge Fábregas (born 1970), former MLB catcher
- Mike Fuentes (born 1958), former MLB outfielder for the Montreal Expos
- Bryan Garcia (born 1995), professional baseball pitcher for the Detroit Tigers
- Alex Gonzalez (born 1973), former MLB infielder
- Dee Gordon (born 1988), MLB player for Miami Marlins
- Charlie Greene (born 1971), former MLB catcher
- Ricky Gutiérrez (born 1970), former MLB player
- Lenny Harris (born 1964), former MLB infielder/outfielder, holds current MLB record for most pinch hits
- Fernando Hernandez (born 1984), current MLB relief pitcher for the Oakland Athletics
- Mark Higgins (1963–2017), former MLB first baseman for the Cleveland Indians
- Bobby Hogue (1921–1987), former MLB pitcher for the Boston Braves, St. Louis Browns and New York Yankees
- Jay Howell (born 1955), former MLB relief pitcher
- Dick Howser (1936–1987), former NBA player and manager
- Jon Jay (born 1985), MLB player
- Charles Johnson (born 1971), former MLB catcher
- Jerry Johnson (1943–2021), former MLB pitcher
- Randy Johnson (born 1958), former MLB player for the Chicago White Sox and Minnesota Twins
- Ross Jones (born 1960), former MLB shortstop for the New York Mets, Seattle Mariners and Kansas City Royals
- Jeff Keppinger (born 1980), current MLB infielder for the Tampa Bay Rays
- Evan Kravetz (born 1996), MLB pitcher for the Cincinnati Reds
- Jim Lewis (born 1955), former MLB pitcher for the Seattle Mariners, New York Yankees and Minnesota Twins
- Mickey Lopez (born 1973), former MLB second baseman for the Seattle Mariners
- Mike Lowell (born 1974), former MLB third baseman for the New York Yankees, Florida Marlins (now Miami Marlins) Marlins, and Boston Red Sox
- Manny Machado (born 1992), current MLB infielder for the San Diego Padres
- Christopher Marrero (born 1988), current MLB first baseman for the Washington Nationals
- J. D. Martinez (born 1987), current MLB outfielder for the Boston Red Sox
- Luis Martinez (born 1985), current MLB catcher for the Texas Rangers
- Rob Murphy (born 1960), former MLB relief pitcher
- Don Newhauser (born 1947), former MLB pitcher for the Boston Red Sox
- Dan Otero (born 1985), current MLB relief pitcher for the San Francisco Giants
- Henry Owens (born 1979), MLB pitcher for the Florida Marlins
- Brad Peacock (born 1988), current MLB pitcher for the Oakland Athletics
- Dan Perkins (born 1975), former MLB pitcher for the Minnesota Twins
- Nick Regilio (born 1978), former MLB pitcher for the Texas Rangers
- Carlos Reyes (born 1969), former MLB pitcher
- Mickey Rivers (born 1948), former MLB center fielder for the California Angels, New York Yankees, and Texas Rangers
- Alex Rodriguez (born 1975), former MLB player for Seattle Mariners, Texas Rangers and New York Yankees; born in New York City, but moved to Miami as a child
- Iván Rodríguez (born 1971), former MLB catcher for the Texas Rangers, Miami Marlins, Detroit Tigers, New York Yankees and Houston Astros
- Sean Rodriguez (born 1985), current MLB shortstop for the Philadelphia Phillies organization
- Mandy Romero (born 1967), former MLB catcher for the San Diego Padres, Boston Red Sox and Colorado Rockies
- Al "Flip" Rosen (1924–2015), MLB four-time All-Star third baseman and first baseman, MVP, two-time home run champion, two-time RBIleader
- Ryan Sadowski (born 1982), former MLB pitcher currently playing in the Korea Baseball Organization
- Gaby Sánchez (born 1983), current MLB free agent first baseman; played for the Miami Marlins
- Dennis Sherrill (born 1956), former MLB infielder for the New York Yankees
- Mose Solomon (1900–1966), the "Rabbi of Swat", MLB player
- Shannon Stewart (born 1974), current MLB outfielder free agent
- Larry Thomas (born 1969), former MLB pitcher for the Chicago White Sox
- Danny Valencia (born 1984), American-Israeli current MLB player for the Baltimore Orioles
- Elih Villanueva (born 1986), current MLB pitcher for the Miami Marlins
- Garrett Wittels (born 1990), baseball player
- Woody Woodward (born 1942), former MLB infielder for the Milwaukee/Atlanta Braves and Cincinnati Reds; GM of the Seattle Mariners

=== Basketball ===
• Sylvia Fowles, ( born 1985), Miami Edison, Gulliver Prep, Former Professional Basketball Player, WNBA Champion and MVP, Olympic Gold Medalist, World Championship Gold Medalist

- Ray Allen (born 1975), retired NBA player, Miami Heat 2013–2014
- Trevor Ariza (born 1985), NBA small forward for the Miami Heat (born in Miami, raised in Los Angeles)
- Carlos Arroyo (born 1979), guard for the Galatasaray Liv Hospital (Turkey)
- Raja Bell (born 1976), former NBA guard
- Steve Blake (born 1980), NBA point guard for the Portland Trail Blazers (Hollywood)
- Chris Bosh (born 1984), NBA player, current resident of Miami
- Rakeem Buckles (born 1990), professional basketball player in the Israeli Basketball Premier League
- Amir Celestin (born 1990), plays for Maccabi Haifa of the Israeli Basketball Premier League
- Mario Chalmers (born 1986), NBA player
- Keyon Dooling (born 1980), NBA guard
- Goran Dragic (born 1986), NBA player for the Miami Heat, resident of both Slovenia and Miami
- Doug Edwards (born 1971), former NBA power forward for the Atlanta Hawks
- Ed Elisma (born 1975), basketball player
- Udonis Haslem (born 1980), NBA forward for the Miami Heat
- Dewan Hernandez (born 1996), NBA player for Toronto Raptors
- LeBron James (born 1984), NBA player, Miami Heat 2011–2014
- Eddie Jones (born 1971), former NBA player (Pompano Beach)
- James Jones (born 1980), NBA small forward for the Cleveland Cavaliers
- Shawn Jones (born 1992), basketball player for Hapoel Jerusalem of the Israeli Basketball Premier League
- Maurice Kemp (born 1991), basketball player in the Israeli Basketball Premier League
- Brandon Knight (born 1991), NBA point guard for the Phoenix Suns
- Frank Martin (born 1966), current head coach for Men's Basketball at the University of South Carolina
- Anthony Mason (1966–2015), NBA player
- Beatrice Mompremier (born 1996), WNBA player for the Atlanta Dream
- Alonzo Mourning (born 1970), retired NBA player, member of Naismith Memorial Basketball Hall of Fame, current resident of Miami
- Shaquille O'Neal (born 1972), retired NBA player, member of Naismith Memorial Basketball Hall of Fame
- Glen Rice Jr. (born 1991), professional basketball player Washington Wizards, 2017–18 top scorer in the Israel Basketball Premier League
- Mitch Richmond (born 1965), former NBA player (Ft. Lauderdale)
- Pat Riley (born 1945), current president of the Miami Heat, current resident of Miami
- Yoav Saffar (born 1975), basketball player
- John Salley (born 1964), retired NBA player
- Sam Singer (born 1995), basketball player for Israeli team Bnei Herzliya
- Mychal Thompson (born 1955), former NBA player, NBA champion with Los Angeles Lakers
- Dwyane Wade (born 1982), NBA player for the Miami Heat, resident of both Chicago and Miami
- Neal Walk (1948–2015), former NBA player
- Erica Wheeler (born 1991), WNBA player for the Los Angeles Sparks

=== Football ===
• Nat Moore (born 1951), Miami Edison, Former Professional Football Player, NFL, Miami Dolphins

• Jocelyn Borgella ( born 1971), Miami Edison, Former Professional Football Player, 1st Haitian to make an NFL roster, NFL, CFL, World League

• Warren Bryant, (born 1955), Miami Edison, Former Professional Football Player, NFL, Atlanta Falcons

- Blue Adams (born 1979), NFL cornerback
- Ottis Anderson (born 1957), former NFL running back who was Super Bowl XXV MVP
- Atari Bigby (born 1981), NFL strong safety for the Green Bay Packers
- E.J. Biggers (born 1987), former NFL cornerback for the Tampa Bay Buccaneers
- Bennie Blades (born 1966), former NFL free safety for the Detroit Lions
- Brian Blades (born 1965), former NFL wide receiver for the Seattle Seahawks
- Teddy Bridgewater (born 1992), quarterback for the New Orleans Saints
- Cariel Brooks (born 1991), cornerback for the Arizona Cardinals
- Antonio Brown (born 1988), retired NFL wide receiver, played for the Pittsburgh Steelers, played college football at Central Michigan University
- Isaac Bruce (born 1972), former wide receiver (Ft. Lauderdale)
- Antonio Bryant (born 1981), former NFL wide receiver for the Tampa Bay Buccaneers
- Rashad Butler (born 1983), current NFL offensive lineman for the Houston Texans
- Vernon Carey (born 1981), current NFL offensive lineman for the Miami Dolphins
- Johndale Carty (born 1977), NFL defensive back
- Tony Chickillo (born 1960), NFL defensive lineman
- James Cook (born 1999), current NFL running back for the Buffalo Bills
- Amari Cooper (born 1994), NFL wide receiver
- Bret Cooper (born 1970), Arena Football League player
- Paris Cotton (born 1989), current CFL running back
- Terry Cousin (born 1975), former NFL cornerback
- Travis Daniels (born 1982), current NFL cornerback for the Kansas City Chiefs
- Al Darby (born 1954), NFL tight end
- Troy Davis (born 1975), former NFL running back for the New Orleans Saints
- Charley Diamond (1936–2020), American Football League player
- Elvis Dumervil (born 1984), current NFL defensive end for the Baltimore Ravens
- Onzy Elam (born 1964), former NFL linebacker for the New York Jets and Dallas Cowboys
- Rashad Fenton (born 1997), current NFL cornerback for the Atlanta Falcons
- Joaquin Gonzalez (born 1979), former NFL offensive lineman for the Indianapolis Colts
- Frank Gore (born 1983), current NFL running back for the Indianapolis Colts
- Steve Griffin (born 1964), former NFL and Arena Football League player
- Darius Hadley (born 1973), former Arena Football League player
- Al Harris (born 1974), current NFL cornerback for the Miami Dolphins
- Ted Hendricks (born 1947), former Hall of Fame NFL linebacker
- Marcus Hudson (born 1982), current NFL defensive back for the San Francisco 49ers
- Steve Hutchinson (born 1977), current NFL offensive lineman for the Minnesota Vikings
- Lindy Infante (1940–2015), former head coach of Green Bay Packers and Indianapolis Colts
- Michael Irvin (born 1966), former NFL wide receiver (Ft. Lauderdale)
- Jamaal Jackson (born 1980), current NFL offensive lineman for the Philadelphia Eagles
- Craig Jay (born 1963), former NFL tight end for the Green Bay Packers
- Andre Johnson (born 1981), current NFL wide receiver for the Houston Texans
- Carlos Joseph (1980–2021), current NFL offensive lineman for the Jacksonville Jaguars
- Davin Joseph (born 1983), current NFL offensive lineman for the Tampa Bay Buccaneers
- William Joseph (born 1979), current NFL defensive tackle for the Oakland Raiders
- Patrick Lee (born 1984), current NFL cornerback Green Bay Packers
- Marquand Manuel (born 1979), current NFL strong safety for the Detroit Lions
- Darrell McClover (born 1981), current NFL linebacker for the New York Jets
- Stanley McClover (born 1984), current NFL defensive end for the Houston Texans
- Jerome McDougle (born 1978), current NFL defensive free agent
- Stockar McDougle (born 1977), current NFL offensive lineman free agent
- Willis McGahee (born 1981), current NFL running back for the Cleveland Browns
- Mike McKenzie (born 1976), current NFL cornerback free agent
- Bryant McKinnie (born 1979), current NFL offensive lineman free agent
- Eddie Miles (born 1968), NFL player
- Lamar Miller (born 1991), NFL running back
- Vernand Morency (born 1980), current NFL running back free agent
- Dan Morgan (born 1978), NFL linebacker for the Saints (Coral Springs)
- Santana Moss (born 1979), former NFL wide receiver
- Sinorice Moss (born 1983), current NFL wide receiver for the New York Giants
- Chris Myers, current NFL offensive lineman for the Houston Texans
- Chad Ochocinco (born 1978), former NFL wide receiver
- Branden Oliver (born 1991), college football running back
- Roscoe Parrish (born 1982), current NFL wide receiver for the Buffalo Bills
- Brian Piccolo (1943–1970), late football player who played for the Chicago Bears (Ft. Lauderdale)
- Larry Rentz (born 1947), former AFL defensive back for the San Diego Chargers
- Antonio Robinson (born 1985), current NFL wide receiver for the Green Bay Packers
- Antrel Rolle (born 1982), current NFL free safety for the New York Giants
- Samari Rolle (born 1976), current NFL cornerback for the Baltimore Ravens
- Drew Rosenhaus (born 1966), current NFL agent for players such as Chad Johnson and Terrell Owens
- Mike Rumph (born 1979), former NFL free safety for the Washington Redskins
- Asante Samuel (born 1981), current NFL cornerback for the Atlanta Falcons
- Kevin Smith (born 1986), former University of Central Florida running back; 2008 draft pick for the Detroit Lions
- Steve Spurrier (born 1945), current head football coach at the University of South Carolina
- Duane Starks (born 1974), former NFL cornerback for the Oakland Raiders
- Steve Tannen (born 1948), NFL defensive back with the New York Jets (1970, first round pick)
- Lenny Taylor (born 1961), former NFL wide receiver for the Green Bay Packers
- Sean Taylor (1983–?), former NFL free safety for the Washington Redskins
- Derrick Thomas (1967–2000), late NFL linebacker who was a member of the NFL 1990s
- Stephen Tulloch (born 1985), NFL player for Detroit Lions
- Alan Veingrad (born 1963), former NFL football player
- Carl Vereen (born 1936), former NFL offensive lineman for the Green Bay Packers
- Jonathan Vilma (born 1982), current NFL linebacker for the New Orleans Saints
- Nate Webster (born 1977), current NFL linebacker for the Denver Broncos

=== Golf ===
- Daniel Berger (born 1993), professional PGA Tour golfer
- Erik Compton (born 1979), professional golfer

=== Mixed martial artists ===
- Alex Caceres (born 1988), mixed martial artist fighting in the UFC
- Jorge Masvidal (born 1984), mixed martial artist fighting in the UFC
- Mike Rio (born 1981), professional mixed martial arts fighter, former member of the UFC
- Kimbo Slice (1974–2016), Bahamian-American mixed martial artist, boxer, professional wrestler and occasional actor

=== Soccer ===
- George Acosta (born 2000), midfielder
- Bryan Arguez (born 1989), midfielder
- Steven Cabas (born 1989), forward
- Luis Cálix (born 1988), defender
- Shawn Chin (born 1989), midfielder and forward
- Benjamin Cremaschi (born 2005), midfielder and 2024 Olympian
- Konrad de la Fuente (born 2001), forward

=== Tennis ===
- Jodi Appelbaum-Steinbauer (born 1956), former professional tennis player
- Jay Berger (born 1966), former tennis player; highest world ranking # 7
- Alexis Blokhina (born 2004), tennis player
- Anne Grousbeck (born 1966)
- Anna Kournikova (born 1981), professional tennis player
- Kim Sands, (born 1956), Former Professional Tennis Player, University of Miami, Wimbledon, US Open
- Van Winitsky (born 1959), former tennis player ranked World No. 7 in doubles

=== Multiple disciplines ===
- Eddy Alvarez (born 1990), Olympic short track speed skater and baseball player, and Major League Baseball second baseman

=== Other sports ===
- Fannie Barrios (1964–2005), IFBB professional bodybuilder
- Fabiano Caruana (born 1992), former United States Chess champion
- Lisa Cross (born 1978), IFBB professional bodybuilder
- Layla El (born 1977), former WWE professional wrestler
- Brian Ginsberg (born 1966), gymnast, two-time US junior national gymnastics champion
- Margie Goldstein-Engle (born 1958), equestrian
- Hulk Hogan (1953–2025), professional wrestler, actor
- Ashleigh Johnson (born 1994), water polo goalkeeper
- Glen Johnson (born 1969), former world light heavyweight boxing champion
- Jorge Masvidal (born 1984), mixed martial artist fighting in the UFC
- Floyd Mayweather Jr. (born 1977), professional boxer, boxing promoter
- Yaxeni Oriquen-Garcia (born 1966), IFBB professional bodybuilder
- Hans Pienitz (born 1988), American-born German professional ice hockey player
- Andrew Talansky (born 1988), professional cyclist
- Betty Viana-Adkins (born 1971), IFBB professional bodybuilder
- Lola Vice (born 1998), professional wrestler, mixed martial artist
- Montel Vontavious Porter (born 1973, MVP), professional wrestler

== Miscellaneous ==
- Stephanie Abrams (born 1978), meteorologist at the Weather Channel since 2003
- Nina Agdal (born 1992), Danish model
- Richard A. Appelbaum, U.S. Coast Guard rear admiral
- Don Aronow (1927–1987), speedboat builder and racer
- Stephanie Berman-Eisenberg, supportive housing developer
- Princess Eugénie of Bourbon (born 2007), relative of the Spanish royal family
- Leslie Cochran (1951–2012), Austin, Texas, resident who personified "Keep Austin Weird"
- Kyan Douglas (born 1970), star of Queer Eye for the Straight Guy
- Howard Engle (1919–2009), physician and lead plaintiff in a landmark lawsuit against the tobacco industry
- Manuel J. Fernandez (1925–1980), U.S. Air Force fighter ace; raised in Miami
- Roy Firestone (born 1953), TV personality
- Don Francisco (born 1940), TV host
- Dave Graveline (born 1954), talk radio host
- Leroy Griffith (born 1932), theater and club proprietor
- Charlie Hall (1930–2014), firefighter and member of the Florida House of Representatives
- Richard L. Hoxie (1844–1930), U.S. Army brigadier general
- José Luis de Jesús (1946–2013), leader of the Creciendo en Gracia cult and self-declared messiah
- Kid Fury (born 1987), vlogger and co-host of podcast The Read
- Arefeh Mansouri (born 1980), fashion and costume designer
- Jeanine Mason (born 1991), winner of So You Think You Can Dance (Season 5), actress
- Valeria Morales (born 1998), Miss Colombia 2018
- Ana Navarro (born 1971), political strategist, political commentator for CNN, co-host of The View
- Adriana Paniagua (born 1995), Miss Nicaragua 2018
- Edward C. Peter II (1929–2008), U.S. Army lieutenant general; raised in Miami
- Allen Lawrence Pope (1928–2020), former military and paramilitary aviator who was shot down over Indonesia during the Permesta Rebellion
- Brett Ratner (born 1969), director of the Rush Hour films
- Albert Reed (born 1985), model, Dancing with the Stars
- Crystal Renn (born 1986), plus-size model
- Bella Rodriguez-Torres (2002–2013), pediatric cancer patient whose story inspired the #LiveLikeBella movement and the Live Like Bella Childhood Cancer Foundation.
- Daniel Schechter (born 1962), child psychiatrist and researcher
- Robert Shevin (1934–2005), politician and judge
- O.J. Simpson (1947–2024), football player, actor
- Ondi Timoner (born 1972), film director
- Dayanara Torres (born 1974), Miss Universe 1993
- Rick Tyler (born 1957), white supremacist and political candidate from Tennessee
- Pedro Zamora (1972–1994), AIDS educator and The Real World: San Francisco television personality

== See also ==
- List of Florida International University people
- List of University of Miami alumni
