= Cold Justice =

True crime television series

- Genre: True crime
- Starring: Kelly Siegler; Yolanda McClary; Johnny Bonds; Steve Spingola; Aaron Sam; Tonya Rider
- Theme music composer: Robert ToTeras
- Composer: Robert ToTeras
- Country of origin: United States
- Original language: English
- No. of seasons: 9
- No. of episodes: 131 (list of episodes)

Production
- Executive producers: Dick Wolf; Dan Cutforth; Jane Lipsitz; Tom Thayer
- Running time: 60–90 minutes
- Production companies: Wolf Films; Magical Elves Productions

Original release
- Network: TNT
- Release: September 3, 2013 – September 18, 2015
- Network: Oxygen
- Release: July 22, 2017 – present

Related
- Cold Justice: Sex Crimes

Cold Justice is an investigative true crime series originally broadcast on TNT and currently on Oxygen. The series, produced by Dick Wolf, follows former Harris County, Texas prosecutor Kelly Siegler and a team of investigators as they reopen unsolved murder cases with the consent and assistance of local law enforcement. Crime scene investigator Yolanda McClary, a veteran of the Las Vegas Metro police, also appeared on the series; McClary had earlier been the inspiration for Catherine Willows, the character portrayed by Marg Helgenberger on the series CSI.

As of July 2021, the team has helped to generate 49 arrests and 21 convictions, in addition to four confessions, three guilty pleas and three murder convictions.

Although TNT made no official announcement, McClary wrote on her personal Facebook page in mid-2016 that the series was canceled. She later said that the production company is shopping the series to other networks. In February 2017, it was announced that Cold Justice had been acquired by Oxygen and resumed broadcasts on July 22, 2017. The sixth season aired from July 10, 2021, to January 1, 2022. In May 2023, Oxygen announced the series would return in 2024. In May 2024, Oxygen announced the series would return for its ninth season in 2025.

== Episodes ==
| Season | Episodes | Originally released | | |
| Season | Episodes | First released | Last released | Network |
|---|---|---|---|---|
| 1 | 8 | September 3, 2013 | October 22, 2013 | TNT |
| 2 | 18 | January 17, 2014 | August 15, 2014 | TNT |
| 3 | 24 | January 9, 2015 | September 18, 2015 | TNT |
| 4 | 10 | July 22, 2017 | October 28, 2017 | Oxygen |
| 5 | 26 | August 4, 2018 | May 2, 2020 | Oxygen |
| 6 | 12 | July 10, 2021 | January 1, 2022 | Oxygen |
| 7 | 6 | February 25, 2023 | April 1, 2023 | Oxygen |
| 8 | 11 | February 24, 2024 | May 4, 2024 | Oxygen |
| 9 | 10 | September 13, 2025 | November 15, 2025 | Oxygen |

== Critical reception ==
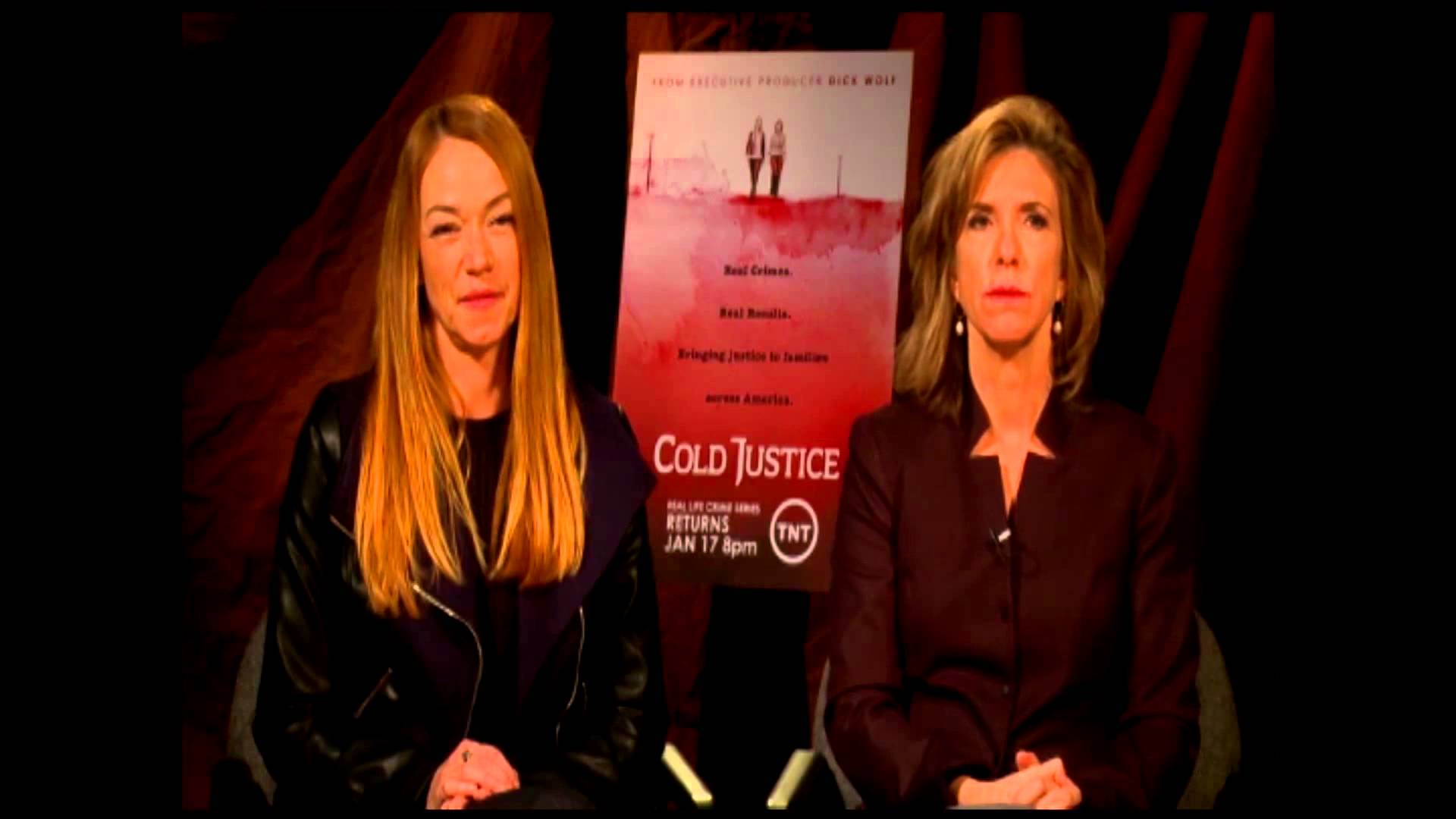
Yolanda McClary (left) and Kelly Siegler (right) interviewed about Cold Justice in 2014.

Cold Justice scored 66 out of 100 on Metacritic based on five "generally favorable" reviews. Mary McNamara of the Los Angeles Times states, "Although one can be fairly certain, if only for legal reasons, that any suspect shown on television is going to turn out to be guilty of something, the lies that are told, the twists of the legal system and the simple horrible stupidity of the crimes provide drama enough." Brian Lowry of Variety stated, "While some of those made-for-TV encounters feel a little stilted, they do tend to pull you along, wanting to see how the drama plays out." Neil Genzlinger of The New York Times states, "The idea that the criminal justice arena also needs a TV show to serve as equalizer is somehow dismaying. Investigative journalism programs have done this for years, but Cold Justice is more ride-to-the-rescue, less public service." David Hinckley of the New York Daily News stated, "There isn't a lot of drama." He added, "Seeking justice is good. Don't hate us if we don't always watch."

== Lawsuits ==
In August 2014, a Gallatin, Tennessee, man filed a defamation lawsuit against the show's producers for implicating and never fully exonerating him in their investigation into the 2010 death of a woman who was suffocated and stabbed inside her home. Joshua Singletary was treated for cuts at the hospital around the time of the murder and arrested as a suspect. He was later released owing to insufficient evidence. According to Singletary, the aired episode ruined his reputation and caused his business to lose customers. He requested a jury trial, seeking $100,000 in damages and other compensations. The lawsuit was reportedly closed in May 2015.

In August 2015, another lawsuit arose from acquitted murder suspect Steven Noffsinger, who sued the series' producers, Siegler, McClary, and Brown for civil rights violations and defamation.

== Spin-off ==
In October 2014, TNT announced it had green-lighted a spin-off of Cold Justice. The new series, titled Cold Justice: Sex Crimes, began on July 31, 2015, and features unsolved sex crimes. Former Harris County, Texas, prosecutors Casey Garrett and Alicia O'Neill travel around the United States to help local law enforcement officers close dormant cases. The first season has 10 episodes.

== See also ==
- Cold Case Files, USA / A&E, 1999 (true cases)
- Solved, USA / ID, 2008 (true cases)
- To Catch a Killer, CAN / OWN, 2014 (true cases)
