= Cold Justice: Sex Crimes =

- Genre: Reality
- Developed by: Dan Cutforth; Dick Wolf; Jane Lipsitz; Kelly Siegler; Tom Thayer
- Presented by: Casey Garrett; Alicia O'Neill
- Theme music composer: Robert ToTeras
- Composer: Robert ToTeras
- Country of origin: United States
- Original language: English
- No. of seasons: 1
- No. of episodes: 10

Production
- Executive producers: Dan Cutforth; Dick Wolf; Jane Lipsitz; Kelly Siegler; Tom Thayer
- Production companies: Wolf Reality; Magical Elves Productions

Original release
- Network: TNT
- Release: July 31 – September 25, 2015

Related
- Cold Justice

Cold Justice: Sex Crimes is an unscripted procedural drama spin-off of Cold Justice that aired on TNT from July 31 to September 25, 2015.

In October 2014, TNT announced it greenlit a spin-off of Cold Justice. This new series features unsolved sex crimes and former Harris County, Texas, prosecutors Casey Garrett and Alicia O'Neill traveling the United States to help local law enforcement officers close dormant cases.

== Episodes ==
No.	Title	Original release date	U.S. viewers (millions)
1	"The Music Teacher"	July 31, 2015	1.15
Former prosecutors Casey Garrett and Alicia O'Neill travel to Leon County, Texas, to find the person who brutally attacked a well-respected retired music teacher.
2	"A Very Public Place"	August 7, 2015	1.23
The Lake Charles, Louisiana, Police Department seeks help in solving two sexual assaults committed in public places.
3	"And Justice for Flint: Part 1"	August 14, 2015	0.93
In Flint, Michigan, the hunt is on for a violent rapist who terrorized a family and another who lured his victim into his home.
4	"And Justice for Flint: Part 2"	August 21, 2015	1.13
A young girl's online meeting leads to a chilling assault in Flint.
5	"On Sacred Ground"	August 28, 2015	1.22
A 17-year-old case of the unsolved rape of a teacher on an elementary school campus in Rogers, Arkansas, is investigated.
6	"The Darkest Night"	September 4, 2015	0.90
A young woman was abducted and raped at gunpoint 23 years ago in Lake Charles, Louisiana, and the suspect is suddenly stubborn, so investigators must find the only witness to the crime.
7	"A Serial Case"	September 11, 2015	0.99
The search is on for a serial rapist in Clearfield, Utah.
8	"The Back Room"	September 18, 2015	0.79
A Salt Lake City woman accused two acquaintances of sexually assaulting her in the back room of a hookah lounge, but a family tragedy prevented her from pressing charges. Three years later, she comes forward seeking justice.
9	"A Case Not Forgotten"	September 25, 2015	0.88
A woman's quick decision to hitch a ride on a cold snowy day 20 years ago in Ogden, Utah, has haunted her life. Investigators help her come forward to try to track down the man responsible for her assault.
10	"Lost in the Footprints"	September 25, 2015	0.84
An eight-months pregnant woman is raped in her own home in Kodiak, Alaska.

== Reception ==
Tom Conroy of Media Life Magazine says "The detective work may not exactly be Holmesian or Poirotian, but there's great satisfaction in watching the trap spring on the lead suspect". He summarizes "The premiere episode didn't leave us cold, but we're pretty sure the series can do better."
