= Scott Meyer =

Scott Meyer may refer to:

- Scott Meyer (baseball) (born 1957), catcher in Major League Baseball
- Scott Meyer (author) (born 1971), author of the webcomic Basic Instructions and the comic fantasy series Magic 2.0
- Scott James Meyer (born 1981), attorney, comedian and writer
- Scott Meyer (ice hockey) (born 1976), American ice hockey player and coach
- Scott Meyer (politician), member of the North Dakota Senate
- Scott Meyer (skier), represented United States at the 2014 Winter Paralympics
- Scott Meyer (soccer), played for Indiana Invaders

== See also ==
- Scott Mayer (disambiguation)
- Scott Meyers (born 1959), American author and software consultant
- Scott Myers (disambiguation)
