= Yvette Prieto =

American model

- Born: March 26, 1978 (age 48); Cuba
- Occupation: Model
- Height: 1.68 m (5 ft 6 in)
- Spouse: Michael Jordan (m. 2013)
- Children: 2

Yvette Prieto (born March 26, 1978) is a Cuban-American model. She has modeled for designer Alexander Wang and appeared in the documentary Cuba: An Island Apart as herself.

== Early life ==
Yvette Prieto was born on March 26, 1978, in Cuba to Carlos and Maria Prieto. She grew up in Miami, Florida.

== Personal life ==
Yvette dated Julio Iglesias Jr. in the early 2000s. In addition to modeling, she worked for her parents' company, at a hospital, and in real estate.

Yvette met basketball legend Michael Jordan while at a Miami nightclub in 2008. They moved in together in 2009 and were engaged over Christmas in 2011. Prieto married Jordan on April 27, 2013, at the Episcopal Church of Bethesda-by-the-Sea. Her wedding gown was designed by J'Aton Couture; celebrities Usher and Robin Thicke sang at the reception. She gave birth to twin daughters on February 9, 2014. Yvette is stepmother to Jordan's three children from his previous marriage to Juanita Vanoy.

Yvette's brother, Carlos Prieto, runs a sneaker store in Miami.

== See also ==
- List of Cuban Americans
- List of people from Miami
