= Michael Flessas =

American actor

Michael C. Flessas (born June 2, 1959 in Miami, Florida), is the birth name of American actor Michael Flessas, who is of Greek ancestry. Flessas' most notable film role was Angry Man in the Cannes Film Festival 2000 Palme d'Or winning film Dancer in the Dark directed by Danish film director Lars von Trier. Originally, the director himself considered playing the role but, instead, the role was given to Flessas. Dancer in the Dark starred Icelandic singer/actress Björk who won the Best Actress award at Cannes for her role. French film icon, César Award winner, and Academy Award nominee Catherine Deneuve, and other noteworthy artists such as Academy Award and Tony Award winner Joel Grey, Peter Stormare, David Morse, and Stellan Skarsgård also performed in the multiple prize winning film. One of Björk's songs for the film received an Academy Award nomination for Best Song.

In Iranian actress/director Susan Taslimi's film Hus i helvete (The film's English title: All Hell Let Loose), starring Melinda Kinnaman, which won the Best Feature Film prize at the Brooklyn International Film Festival in 2003, Flessas played the vicious pornographer "Videomannen" in a nightmarish flashback scene in the film.

Flessas also portrayed massive and deadly Russian hitman "Jurij Rostoff" in Beck - Okänd avsändare, a made for television movie directed by Swedish actor and director Harald Hamrell. Beck - Okänd avsändare was among the popular Swedish Beck detective films and made-for-television movies starring Swedish actor Peter Haber. As "Jurij Rostoff" Flessas weighed in at 150 kilos in the role as a result of weight training and diet; however, in his younger and less heavy years, Flessas danced in the corps de ballet of the Columbia City Ballet then under the direction of Ann Brodie in Columbia, South Carolina.

Although he won two scholarships in Music, Flessas changed majors and majored in Religious Studies and minored in Philosophy at the University of South Carolina. Flessas did not complete his undergraduate degree at the University of South Carolina yet he continued his studies on an informal basis with travels around the world in order to meet and speak with adherents of various religious forms and philosophical points of view.

Flessas began his professional acting career after hearing a barber mention that a Fox Broadcasting Company series in Boston was about to begin production. Although the series, Against the Law starring Academy award nominee Michael O'Keefe lasted for one season, Flessas was in six episodes of the show as an uncredited extra. Flessas was able to do six episodes by constantly changing his facial appearance for each episode of the series. Flessas also was an uncredited extra in films such as HouseSitter, starring Emmy Award winner Steve Martin and Academy Award winner Goldie Hawn, Wind, starring Academy Award winner Cliff Robertson, Matthew Modine, and Jennifer Grey, and the NBC made for television movie MacShayne: Final Roll of the Dice starring Grammy Award winner Kenny Rogers.

Flessas also gained notoriety in the mid-1990s for his creation of a now defunct website entitled "Resources for the Homeless" which was one of the first websites in the United States of America solely devoted to helping the homeless through individual initiative by offering the homeless relevant data on resources via one website. At the time, many poor people were being removed from Milwaukee, Wisconsin welfare rolls while many Milwaukee city officials were engaged in plans to fund and build a new multimillion-dollar stadium. Flessas perceived the situation (building a new stadium while removing the poor from welfare) as an injustice to the poor. Given that libraries in Milwaukee, Wisconsin were just connecting to the World Wide Web, Flessas gathered and placed information regarding all the services available to the homeless in Milwaukee on the web so service providers to the homeless and the homeless themselves (who often sought shelter in local libraries) had equal and rapid access to information about resources available in Milwaukee via the Milwaukee County library system computer network "OMNINET".

"Resources for the Homeless" was considered an unusual information delivery solution at the time given the new nature of the method of delivery and the biased misperception that the homeless did not and would not use computers to learn about resources available. The "Resources for the Homeless" project in Milwaukee received no direct funding for it was Flessas' express purpose to show what one person with computing skills could do to help the homeless with the use of the web. The project began in Milwaukee on a freenet and, later, a similar site was created with the help of a local web designer in Columbia, South Carolina. Flessas' exploits with the site were reported on television in Milwaukee, WIS television in Columbia, and in an article in Silicon Valley's San Jose Mercury News newspaper.

In a newspaper article in Columbia South Carolina's The State newspaper, Flessas promoted the use of e-mail in the 1990s to broadcast a demand (then akin to what is now guerrilla communication and subvertising) that thousands of potential visitors to South Carolina boycott the state's multimillion-dollar tourism industry to force state government officials to remove the Confederate flag from South Carolina's State House dome. (Flessas, through his mother's side of the family, is a descendant of Elisha Jefferson "Elijah" Sutherland who fought with the Confederate States of America during the American Civil War.) Social and political activism is not unknown in the Flessas Family for Flessas himself (through his father's side of the family) is also a direct descendant of Papaflessas through Papaflessas' father Demetrios Flessas.

Micheal Christian Flessas, as he is now called, is now living in the city Katrineholm in Sweden.

== See also ==
- List of people from Miami
