= Bethesda-by-the-Sea =

Episcopal church in Palm Beach, Florida, U.S.

Coordinates: 26°42′40″N 80°02′13″W

Bethesda-by-the-Sea Episcopal Church
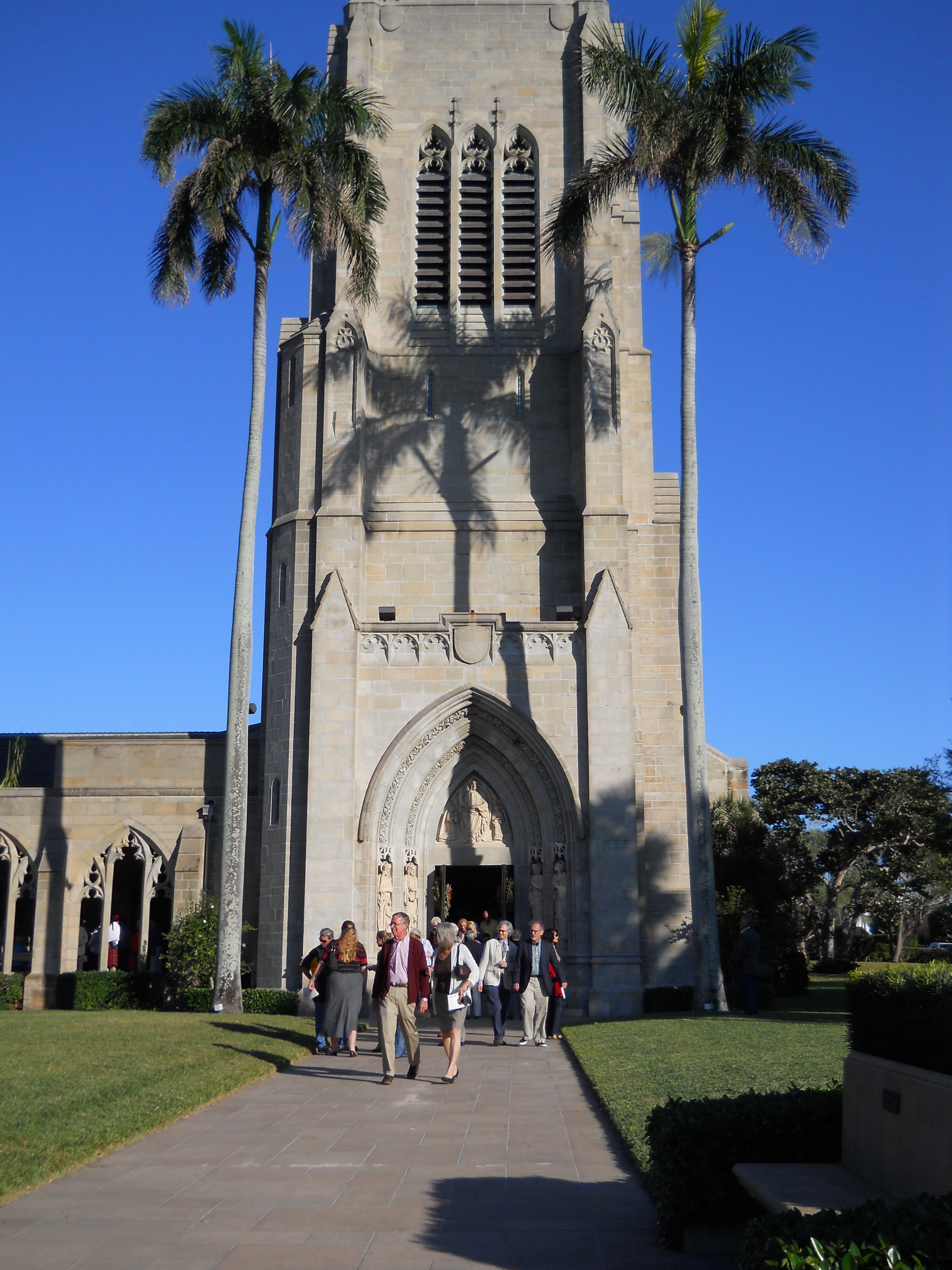
- The church in 2012
- Bethesda-by-the-Sea Episcopal Church
- Location: 141 South County Road; Palm Beach, Florida, U.S.
- Denomination: Episcopal Church
- Website: bbts.org

Architecture
- Style: Gothic Revival
- Completed: 1926

Administration
- Province: Sewanee
- Diocese: Southeast Florida

Bethesda-by-the-Sea is an Episcopal Church by the Lake Worth Lagoon in Palm Beach, Florida. It is part of the Episcopal Diocese of Southeast Florida and the oldest existing congregation in Palm Beach. The church building is an example of the Gothic Revival style and surrounds a courtyard.

In 2018, the church reported 1,580 members; in 2023, it reported 1,701 members. No membership statistics were reported in 2024 national parochial reports. Plate and pledge financial support reported by the church in 2024 was $3,034,849. Average Sunday Attendance (ASA) reported by the church in 2024 was 446 persons. This was a relative decrease from ASA of 502 persons reported in 2021.

== History ==
Initially, the church began in the Little Red Schoolhouse in January 1889. The original church was built of mostly wood from lumber from the beach with service beginning in April of that same year. There was little access to the church aside from by boat. A larger new lot was sought in the following years with a rectory built in 1890. The second church was built in the spring of 1895 and remained in service for many years. The second church held its last service on Easter Sunday April 12, 1925.

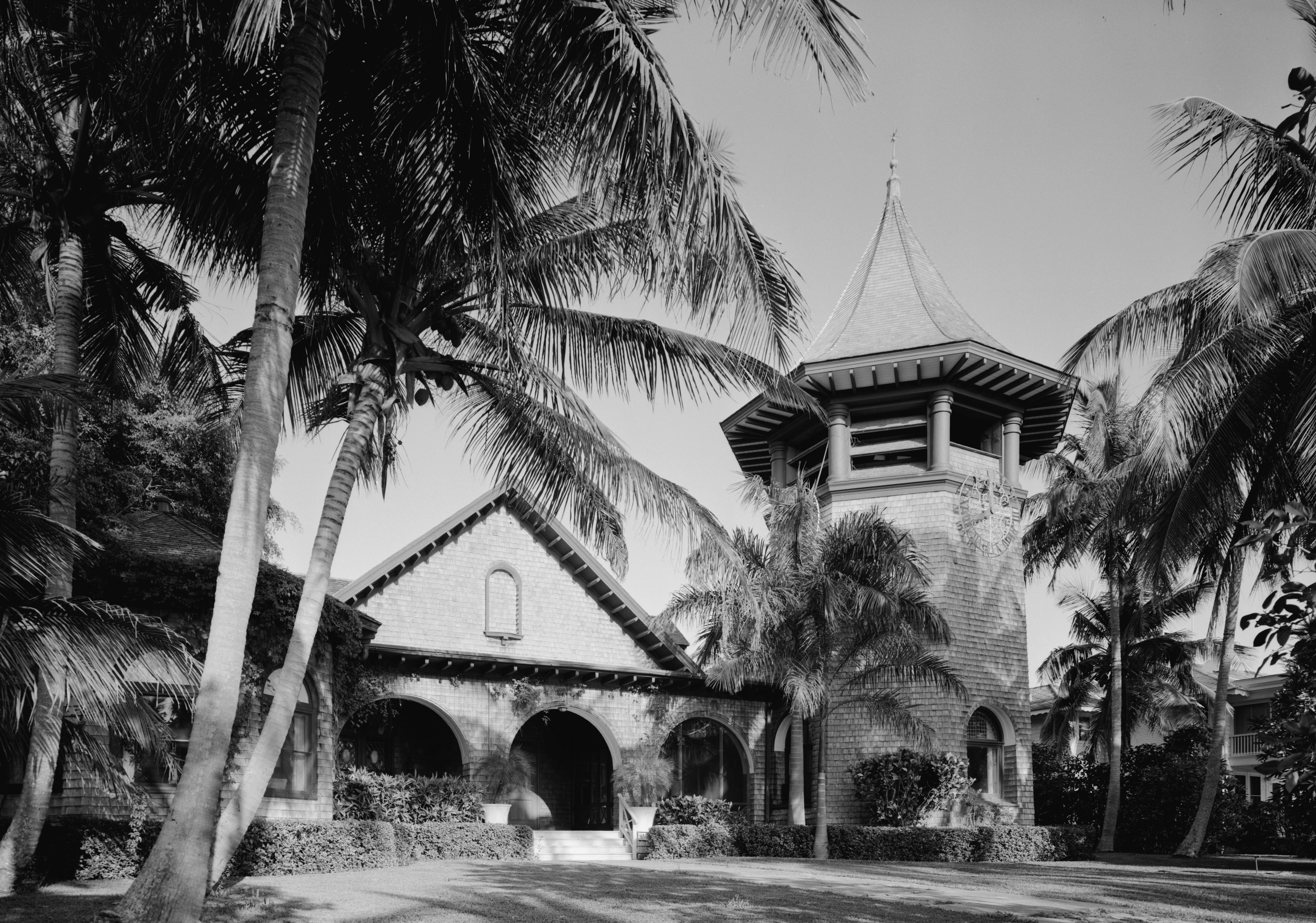
Second church

The church held the first service at its current location on Christmas Day 1926.

Donald and Melania Trump were married in the church on January 22, 2005. Their son, Barron Trump, was christened at the church. They have attended Christmas Eve and Easter Celebrations here in 2016, 2017, and 2019 after Trump's election as President of the United States.

Michael Jordan and Yvette Prieto were married at the church on April 27, 2013.
