= Scott Myers (disambiguation) =

Scott Myers (born 1958) is an American artist.

Scott Myers may also refer to:

- Scott Myers (figure skater), competed in 1989 United States Figure Skating Championships
- Scott Myers (roller skater), Artistic roller skating at the World Games

== See also ==
- Scott Meyers (born 1959), American author and software consultant
- Scott Meyer (disambiguation)
