= Scott Mayer =

Scott Mayer may refer to:

- Scott Mayer (racing driver) (born 1964), race car driver
- Scott Mayer (bishop) (born 1955), fifth Bishop of the Episcopal Diocese of Northwest Texas

== See also ==
- Scott Meyer (disambiguation)
