= List of Cold Justice episodes =

Cold Justice is an unscripted true crime series originally broadcast on TNT and currently on Oxygen. The series, produced by Dick Wolf, follows former prosecutor Kelly Siegler and a team of investigators as they re-open unsolved murder cases with the consent of local law enforcement. As of January 2015, the team has helped local agencies secure 21 arrests, 11 criminal indictments, four confessions, three guilty pleas, and three murder convictions.

Despite no official announcement from TNT, in May 2016, former crime scene investigator Yolanda McClary announced on her Facebook account that the series was canceled. She later stated that the production company was shopping the series to other networks. In June 2017, Oxygen announced that Cold Justice would premiere with new episodes on July 22, 2017.

== Series overview ==
Season	Episodes	Originally released		
Season	Episodes	First released	Last released	Network
1	8	September 3, 2013	October 22, 2013	TNT
2	18	January 17, 2014	August 15, 2014	TNT
3	24	January 9, 2015	September 18, 2015	TNT
4	10	July 22, 2017	October 28, 2017	Oxygen
5	26	August 4, 2018	May 2, 2020	Oxygen
6	12	July 10, 2021	January 1, 2022	Oxygen
7	6	February 25, 2023	April 1, 2023	Oxygen
8	11	February 24, 2024	May 4, 2024	Oxygen
9	10	September 13, 2025	November 15, 2025	Oxygen

== Episodes ==
=== Season 1 (2013) ===
No. overall	No. in season	Title	Original release date	U.S. viewers (millions)
1	1	"Small Town Suicide?"	September 3, 2013	2.93
The 2001 death of 31 year old Pam Shelly in Cuero, Texas, is investigated by Kelly, Yolanda, and Johnny Bonds. This is a 12 year old cold case from DeWitt County. After divorcing her husband, Pam began dating Ronnie Hendrick, an old family friend. They fell in love, and she moved with her 2 children (Kayla was 12 years old, and Dustin was 9 years old at the time) from Arkansas to Texas to live with him. Their love affair went from passionate to volatile to combative. One day, after an argument, Ronnie reportedly pushed Pam's 12 year old daughter, Kayla. Enraged and constantly fighting him, Pam said she was leaving for good. After packing, she was in the bathroom when her daughter said she heard a scream and ran to find Pam on the floor with a gunshot wound to her head. Pam later died in the hospital, and her case was ruled a suicide. On September 10, 2013, Ronnie Hendrick pled guilty to killing Pamela and was sentenced to 22 years in prison.
2	2	"Mother"	September 10, 2013	2.16
The 2006 death of Mattie Williams in Collinston, Louisiana, is investigated. She is the mother of 13 children, and numerous grandchildren. This is a 7 year old cold case. On August 28, 2006, a friend of Mattie's went to her home after receiving no response to repeated attempts to reach her. The friend noticed blood on the outside wall of the house and called the police, who found no trace of Mattie inside. Many of Mattie's church friends and family gathered to search for her. She was found six hours later, stabbed and bludgeoned to death, in a remote wooded area about three miles from her home. Three men, including Mattie's own son, were indicted for the second-degree murder of Mattie. Stanley Mitchell, Renwick Jackson, and son John Williams are currently in jail awaiting trial.
3	3	"Home Town Hero"	September 17, 2013	1.70
The 1982 death of 48 year old widow Charlene Corporon in Palacios, Texas is investigated (Matagorda County). This is a 31 year old cold case. Charlene and son Gary developed a combative relationship after Gary's father and Charlene's husband, Willy, died in a tragic accident. Gary was allegedly verbally and physically abusive towards his mother. One morning, Charlene's boyfriend called her house looking for her and Gary answered saying, "Charlene doesn't look too good." When the police arrived, she was dead from being shot in the head. Gary was indicted for the murder on September 20, 1982 before a Grand Jury, and was suspiciously not arrested as he should have been. The new District Attorney discovered this when Kelly Siegler and team recommended again in 2013 that Gary be indicted before a grand jury. The State Attorney General is handling the case, and investigating why Gary was never arrested. As of this television airing, Gary has not yet been tried.
4	4	"Hit and Run"	September 24, 2013	N/A
The 1988 death of 17 year old Rachelle Escalante in Globe, Arizona, is investigated. On July 6, 1988, Rachelle went to a party with some friends from high school. After an argument there, Rachelle angrily walked away from the party. That evening, patrol officers were driving when they saw what was thought to be a dog moving slowly across the road. As they got closer, they realized it was actually a young woman crawling. They stopped the car, got out, ran to the woman, and witnessed Rachelle die in front of them. She had been the victim of a hit-and-run. One suspect was boyfriend Tony Romero who owned a vehicle that may have hit Rachelle. A second suspect was Cathy Arana, who wanted to be Tony's girlfriend and was jealous of Rachelle. Unfortunately, Cathy Arana was hit and killed by a car a few years after Rachelle's. The case remains unsolved, as either an accident or murder.
5	5	"Hiding in Plain Sight"	October 1, 2013	1.31
The 1998 death of 32 year old Eric Baxter in Dickson, Tennessee, is investigated. This is a 15 year old cold case in Dickson County. On August 20, 1998, Eric's mother arrived home to find her son lying on the hallway floor with multiple gunshot wounds to the head and chest. The house is located outside of town by several miles. Investigators believe the killer had purposefully driven out to the location and, the evidence indicated, planned a sneak attack on the home. Based on the evidence, it appeared that the killer or killers were doing surveillance on the house from the back yard. It is also believed that Eric's mother would have also been a victim had she been home that night. The trial for Thomas Wortham is scheduled to begin Feb. 21, 2017. Wortham, who was Baxter's former business acquaintance, and Wortham’s half-brother Wallace Brasel were charged.
6	6	"Small Town Tragedy"	October 8, 2013	1.35
On July 9, 1995, the 18 year old cold case of Mary Anne Holmes in Thatcher, Arizona, is investigated. Holmes had escaped an abusive ex and moved with her children to Thatcher. One Saturday, after hosting a yard sale, she and her two young daughters fell asleep in the living room. The next morning, four-year-old Ashleigh ran naked, with hands bound, to a neighbor's house. She wanted to know why her mommy would not wake up. While neither Ashleigh nor her 18-month-old sister Sara were harmed, their mother, was brutally abused and murdered, right in front of her girls. This was a sadistic killing, and Ashleigh said the Lion Man did it. One suspect was John Bursee, who had a solid alibi. Another was David Black, who was the landlord's son and did repairs on Mary Anne's rental home. David Black also had a strange fascination with Mary Anne. The third suspect was Phillip Turley, with liked to harm his girlfriends during sex. Phillip Turley has bipolar disorder, complicating an indictment. The case remains open.
7	7	"Hatchet"	October 15, 2013	1.26
The 1988 death of 49 year old Isabel Cordle in Bellevue, Ohio, is investigated. This is a 25 year old cold case. In the early morning of January 24, 1988, Cordle, mother of six, fell asleep on her couch. Sometime before 6:00 AM, someone sneaked up on her while she slept and hit her on the head with a hatchet four times, killing her. Her husband, Richard Cordle, found her the next morning as he prepared for work and called 9-1-1. When the police arrived, Isabel's husband and three of her children were upstairs, scared and confused. Police not only found trails of blood, they also found what could have been the murder weapon—a hatchet, propped up on a tree outside, right by the door. Although the evidence showed the killer could not have come from outside the house, neither the husband nor any children has been proven to be Isabel's killer. One suspect was Mark Carter (Cordle's Neighbor), who assaulted Isabel Cordle's son. Another suspect was Greg Weller, who was a potential witness for Mark Carter in court documents prior to the plea agreement Carter reached with prosecutors on the rape charge against him. After the episode aired, more tips were received, leading investigators to believe that Greg Weller may have been responsible. Both Cordle's husband and son were eliminated from the suspect pools, according to Detective O'Connell.
8	8	"Blind Love"	October 22, 2013	N/A
The 2008 death of 54 year old Rocky Bryant in Seagraves, Texas, is investigated. On March 25, 2008, approximately 30 minutes after clocking in to work at a local feed plant, Rocky was found brutally beaten in a building where he worked within walking distance of his house. He was pronounced dead at the hospital a few hours later. As the investigators dug into his wife Patricia Graves' background, it was evident that she was having an extra-marital affair and had reason to want to be free of her husband. Her boyfriend, Jose Luis Villarreal, was a very viable suspect as Rocky's killer. He was known to have a temper and a history of being highly possessive of women he was seeing. Probable cause arose to indict Patricia as a party to the murder, by revealing Rocky's work schedule to her former boyfriend and suspect, Luis. In mid-February 2014, Patricia Graves accepted a plea deal for the murder of Rocky. As of April 2014, Jose Luis Villarreal is still in jail awaiting trial.

=== Season 2 (2014) ===
No. overall	No. in season	Title	Original release date	U.S. viewers (millions)
9	1	"Gone"	January 17, 2014	1.41
The 2001 death of Tracy Allen in Altus, Oklahoma is investigated. Tracy had recently gotten out of a volatile marriage with Garland Allen, but the two remained in close contact after their divorce. One evening in May 2001, Tracy had her neighbor baby-sit for their two young daughters. Later that night, Garland arrived at the neighbor's to say Tracy was at his house, and she had asked him to pick up their daughters. He then dropped the girls off at his mother’s house, telling her that Tracy had run away with another man and had left him with the girls. A few days later, Garland surrendered custody of his girls to his mother and then left town. He confessed to beating her to death and led investigators to her body. Allen pleaded guilty to second-degree murder in a Jackson County Courtroom and was sentenced to 40 years in prison.
10	2	"A Monster Among Us"	January 24, 2014	1.40
The 2005 death of Willie Louise Kellum in Camp Hill, Alabama is investigated. The day of February 21, 2005 started off as fairly uneventful for Louise. She ran some errands, including to the local grocery store, which was the last place she was seen alive. Later that evening, her grandson who was living with her at the time, found her lying unconscious in his room and called 911. When police arrived, they found her with a cord wrapped around her neck and bruises covering her body. Markis Heard, a repeat sex offender, was indicted for the rape and capital murder of Louise, after DNA evidence was found on her underwear. He pleaded guilty; his plea agreement has him serving 10 years in prison and 30 years on parole.
11	3	"High School Sweethearts"	January 31, 2014	1.58
The 1997 deaths of Charles and Kathy Hayes in La Porte, Texas are investigated. Charlie and Kathy dated throughout high school, but went their separate ways after graduation. Many years later, they saw each other while stopped at a red light, resumed their romance soon and eventually got married. Charles converted their garage into a music studio for their southern rock-and-roll band to practice. On September 27, 1997, the police were called to the home by Charles' teenage daughter Tiffenie. Officers found Charles sitting in a chair, his head covered with blood, and more spattered throughout the room. Kathy was found dead, lying face down in the hallway with her head bashed in. Charles was flown to a nearby hospital and died shortly after arrival. There was no forced entry into the house and nothing had been stolen. The weapon, a claw hammer, was found in a nearby concrete culvert the next day. On January 30, 2014, Craig Houser, Charles' second cousin, was arrested on two counts of capital murder for the Hayes deaths. A hung jury was the result. The DA decided not to retry the case.
12	4	"First Love"	February 7, 2014	1.42
The 1997 death of Marisol Gonzalez in Cottonwood, Arizona is investigated. In the summer before her junior year of high school, she began dating one of her neighbors and classmates, Cecilio Cruz. He was her first love. However, she quickly realized that she was not the only one that he loved, and they broke up. Soon after, she learned she was pregnant. Feeling supported by family and friends, she decided she was going to have the baby. On March 25, 1997, Marisol, now full term in her pregnancy, was waiting for a call from Cecilio and went outside with the phone. That was the last time she was seen alive. The following morning, her body was found in an alleyway a block away from her house. She had been shot once in the face. In 2014, Cecilio Cruz awaits a grand jury indictment in the murder of Marisol and her unborn son. On November 14, 2020, a hung jury was declared in Cruz's trial.
13	5	"He Said, He Said"	February 14, 2014	1.32
The 1998 death of Erika Case in West Terre Haute, Indiana is investigated. On September 5, 1998, she and older sister Mary were house-sitting for a family friend. After Mary left for her shift at the local hospital, Erika’s good friend Isaiah Dooley arrived with his friend Clint Mackey. For the next few hours, they all swam in the pool, drank alcohol and ate pizza. After work the next morning, Mary drove back to the house and found Erika dead inside, lying on the living room floor. She had been stabbed 33 times. The boys each claimed Erika was alive when they left the house, although they made conflicting statements regarding who last saw her alive. Sixteen years later, Mackey confessed and was arrested for the murder, which was committed after Erika turned him down for sex. He was sentenced to 40 years in prison.
14	6	"Ambush"	February 21, 2014	1.55
The 2002 deaths of Bud and Litina Matlock in Malvern, Arkansas are investigated. On November 18, 2002, Bud finished a meeting at the Boys & Girls Club. While he was away, intruders came inside the Matlock house where they found Litina cooking dinner and folding clothes. They forced her to her knees and shot her once behind the ear, killing her instantly. Soon after, Bud, unaware of what was happening, pulled into his driveway with their two-year-old son in a car seat in the back. As he opened his car door, he was shot at from his own porch. He managed to get out of the car and run down the road, but was chased and shot in the back of the head, dying on the street. The child was not harmed and the killers were never caught. However, a prime suspect in the case is a man vowing revenge after Bud broke his jaw for being too friendly with Litina.
15	7	"Single Working Mom"	February 28, 2014	1.29
The 2010 death of Lydia Gutierrez in Gallatin, Tennessee is investigated. On August 12, 2010, Lydia spent her day off from her waitressing job at home with her two youngest sons, while her oldest son was at school. The eight-year-old came home to find his two little brothers trying to wake her up out of the floor. The oldest boy then gathered his brothers and ran to a neighbor’s house where they called 911. The police found her had a plastic bag over her head and stabbed to death. Two knives were still in her neck. Her boyfriend at the time was initially arrested for the murder, after he was treated for suspicious cuts at the hospital, but he was released due to lack of evidence. During the program significant progress was made but it was insufficient to make any arrests. An appeal was made at the end of the show for new witnesses or anyone with further information to come forward to possibly help secure an arrest and potential conviction. The case remains open and active.
16	8	"Billy Goat Hill"	March 7, 2014	1.43
The 1997 death of Victoria Carr Hollingsworth in Chattanooga, Tennessee is investigated. In 1999, a dog brought a human skull into its yard. Dental records later identified the skull as Hollingsworth's, and the rest of her remains were found in a nearby wooded area called Billy Goat Hill. Victoria had married Lebron Hollingsworth in 1996. In July 1997, she told him that she was moving with their children into her parents' house a few miles away. Although separated, she continued to take him to work every morning. On August 18, 1997, she vanished. Sixteen years later, Lebron was arrested for her murder, after numerous women over the years experienced his MO of abuse—with one ex-partner mentioning his taking her to Billy Goat Hill. In January 2015, Lebron was convicted by a jury for the second-degree murder of Victoria.
17	9	"Lady in the Box"	March 14, 2014	1.45
The 2002 death of Carolyn Jansen in Aurora, Colorado, is investigated. Jansen's decomposing body was found in a plastic container, sealed with duct tape, by Richard Johnson in his shed. Three years earlier, he had been asked by his friend Jon "JD" Harrington, Jansen's roommate, to store some things there. Harrington's fingerprints were found on the duct tape and he was arrested for the second-degree murder of Jansen. In August 2015 a jury convicted Harrington of Jansen's murder. He faces 24 to 48 years in prison.
18	10	"Copper Dollar Ranch"	March 28, 2014	1.50
On March 3, 1983, Steven Fisher's and his girlfriend Melisa Gregory's bodies were found at his trailer at Copper Dollar Ranch in Newton, Iowa. Although Steven had been in a relationship with Melisa for about nine months, he was still married to Theresa Supino Fisher, who, along with her twin brother Timothy, admitted to visiting Steven at his trailer on the night before the bodies were discovered. They were the last known people to see Steven and Melisa alive. Rumors of drug trafficking at the ranch also circulated. It was determined that brutality of the murders, coupled with a re-enactment of events, led to Theresa's arrest, 31 years later. However, in February 2015, she was acquitted of the charges.
19	11	"Stranded"	June 20, 2014	1.71
Alma Henderson, 41, was a single mother of five children in Bay City, Texas. On April 7, 1988, she went out with friends to a club. She never came home. After she did not report to work the next morning, her daughter Kasy filed a missing persons report. A couple days later, police found Alma's car in a motel parking lot. She was in the backseat, dead from a single gunshot wound to the back of her head. Conflicting accounts arose about with whom she was last seen. Now, 26 years after her murder, the list of suspects narrows to a man who had sexually assaulted another woman earlier that night as well as Alma.
20	12	"Death by Design"	June 27, 2014	1.56
In Hempstead, Texas, in 1986, Diann Hoelscher, a fashion designer, goes missing. She was last seen on February 4, when, according to her husband, she left her San Antonio home to travel to Houston to sell some high-end fabrics. She never returned. Her remains were found 11 years later but could not be identified until 2014. The investigators uncover her husband's plan of taking out a life insurance policy, and her disappearance coincides with the two-year window in which it can be collected. His ex-girlfriend also relates the night she woke up to him choking her.
21	13	"Kirby's Speed Shop"	July 11, 2014	1.62
In Columbus, Georgia, local investigators seek help in solving the shooting death of Kirby Smith, an auto body shop owner killed in 2004. Most everyone knew and loved Kirby. However, at the time, he and his second wife, Becky were embroiled in a bitter divorce and custody battle, during which she was dating her future husband, Heath Haynie. She also had an unusual relationship with Bull Phillips, who seemed willing to do almost anything for her. Just prior to his murder, Kirby told family and friends he and Becky finally came to an agreement about their divorce. That evening, Kirby was shot and killed in his shop. The team gathered enough evidence and testimony to arrest both Becky and Phillips for the murder, when it was revealed Phillips' timeline for the death centered around contact with Becky.
22	14	"Justice Served"	July 18, 2014	TBA
John Walsh interviews the investigative team for their behind-the-scenes insights. Exclusive updates on past cases and questions to Kelly and Yolanda will be featured.
23	15	"Sunspot Highway"	July 25, 2014	1.72
On November 20, 1987, Margie Pointer dropped off her five-year-old son at her babysitter's house but never returned to pick him up. Her car was found in a hotel parking lot, a place she would often park to carpool to work. Witnesses saw her having breakfast with an unknown male at the hotel restaurant. The two supposedly were holding hands, but at one point, she pulled her hand away as if he upset her. The two left the restaurant together, and that was the last time she was seen alive. Her husband was working overseas in Japan, and it was rumored that she was having an affair. Police officials were left with no evidence and no body, and the investigation went cold. On March 18, 2004, a forest-thinning crew came across her remains in the Cloudcroft, New Mexico woods about 20 miles from her home. Her body was identified through dental records, but no official cause of death was determined.
24	16	"Other Side of the Tracks"	August 1, 2014	TBA
Robin Stone, 17, of Cambridge, Ohio, was pregnant. She told her parents that the father was a boy from school she had been dating. On August 27, 1991, she received a call, told her mother she was going to help a classmate with homework, and never returned home. Robin's car was found later that evening near Luburgh Lake in Guernsey County, but there was no sign of her. A missing persons investigation was quickly begun, but it was not until December 28, 1991, that hunters found her and her unborn child's remains near the lake. Her body was so badly decomposed that a cause of death could not be determined. Sheriff Michael McCauley was elected in 2000, he put a renewed focus on cold case investigations and Robin's case was re-opened. The episode focused on determining the baby's paternity and investigating the family who owned the land where she was found.
25	17	"Second Thoughts"	August 8, 2014	TBA
Alma Noffsinger was a 29-year-old attractive, fun-loving mother of three young children in Paulding, Ohio. Recently divorced from her second husband, Steve, the two were in a custody battle over the child they had together. Throughout Alma's marriage to Steve, she maintained a good relationship with her first husband, David, the father of her two older children. On December 17, 1981, a neighbor noticed that Alma's front door had been open all morning. Concerned, she walked inside the house, calling out for Alma, when she came upon her lifeless body lying face-down in her bed. There was blood all over the room. Almost 33 years later, after being approached by Alma's family, the new Paulding County Sheriff re-opened Alma's case, assigning two seasoned investigators to it. In August 2014, Steve was arrested for Alma's murder, when his history of violence surfaced. In May 2015 a jury acquitted Steve Noffsinger.
26	18	"Fool Me Once, Fool Me Twice?"	August 15, 2014	TBA
In October 1973, 23-year-old Kathy Dean married 22-year-old Earl Taylor of Vigo County, Indiana, after a short courtship. On April 2, 1975, Earl reportedly returned home and found her submerged in the bathtub with an electric clock radio sunk beneath her. She was declared dead from an apparent electrocution and drowning. Earl, a budding insurance salesman, went on to marry another woman who later had died when the vehicle in which they were traveling ran off the road into a lake. Earl was charged with her death and served 26 years of a 60-year sentence. Because of this, Kathy's case was re-opened. Although the original coroner had died, he was initially suspicious of her electrocution. The current coroner confirmed drowning was the cause of death, and bruising on her body at the time aroused the suspicion. It was also revealed the radio had been tampered with and given an even longer cord to support the electrocution theory. Earl had also forged Kathy's signature on several insurance policies. He was arrested and charged with Kathy's murder in July 2014. He was convicted in 2016.

=== Season 3 (2015) ===
No. overall	No. in season	Title	Original release date	U.S. viewers (millions)
27	1	"Still of the Night"	January 9, 2015	1.57
In Pocatello, Idaho, in September 2004, someone crept inside 25-year-old Nori Jones' bedroom window while she was sleeping and brutally stabbed her to death. Friends found her body when she failed to show up for work. Police discovered a fingerprint but had no technology to process the other DNA found at the crime scene. In September 2014, Brad Scott Compher was arrested for the murder and awaits an April 2015 hearing.
28	2	"Miss Congeniality"	January 16, 2015	1.55
Near Naches, Washington, in February 1997, a passer-by found Deborah Bailey shot to death in her car. Her husband Barrett claimed he was at home at the time of her estimated death and suggested that someone from her secretive drug world possibly killed her. Friends and family admitted to her casual drug use, but did not view that as a reason for her death. Barrett remained a person of interest, even though, upon further investigation, not enough evidence was found to arrest him. In January 2015, detectives and prosecutors arrested him in Idaho on suspicion of first-degree murder. In May 2017, he pleaded to second-degree murder.
29	3	"Burned"	January 23, 2015	1.77
In October 2007, Fairview Park, Ohio, emergency crews were called by neighbors to 67-year-old Gwen Bewley's house. She was found dead in her burned-out kitchen. Her neighbor's brother was soon arrested for stealing her rented car and some personal possessions, although he was responsible for helping her financially. Her laptop was among the items, which he took an interest in retrieving from police custody. In 2014, computer analysts discovered that Gwen had canceled some of the payments he made with her credit cards when she was living. This information, coupled with several women's testimony revealing his violent nature, allowed prosecutors to present his case to a grand jury. Timothy Sheline was indicted in December 2014.
30	4	"Mother Daughter Tragedy"	January 30, 2015	1.51
Lisa Bennett, a 29-year-old mother, and Kaylee, her six-year-old daughter, were found strangled to death in their Fort Wayne, Indiana, home in 1993. Two suspects, both of whom were Lisa's boyfriends, were viewed as suspects in the deaths. However, at the time, proper crime scene procedures were not followed, and contaminated DNA evidence has not led to an arrest in the unsolved case.
31	5	"Operator, Hurry!"	February 6, 2015	1.52
In 1981, Nancy Jo Canode, a young mother in St. Johns County, Florida, called 9-1-1 from her home phone, fearing for her life, but the call quickly ended. While the operator discussed the call with her supervisor, Nancy Jo was brutally stabbed to death. Nancy Jo's daughter Suzanne found her body an hour later and called the police. Investigation into Nancy Jo's husband Ken revealed his habit of using numerous women for their money to satisfy his gambling addiction. In addition, he had also offered someone money to kill Mary Jo, however, the person backed out at the last minute. Investigators believe Ken then killed Mary Jo himself. Despite not getting a confession, nor much help, from Ken, enough evidence was gathered to build a case against him.
32	6	"The Record Keeper"	February 20, 2015	1.46
In July 2006, Kyle Smith was found beaten and stabbed to death in his Bridgeport, West Virginia, home. Police had two suspects, Kyle's cousin and his cousin's son, but no one has been arrested in the murder. Almost eight years later, the son has become the most likely suspect, due to his being deeply in debt and relying on Kyle's help. The Harrison County prosecutor was reviewing the case.
33	7	"Little League Dad"	February 27, 2015	1.50
Early one morning in October 2009, Paul Bowman was found dead in bed from blunt force trauma to his head. Arlington, Texas police found the house in disarray, as in a robbery, but nothing valuable was missing. After questioning Paul's wife Martha, who gave conflicting statements, and others, police thought of her and her lover as suspects. The investigators don’t believe that her lover is involved. Despite investigators' best efforts, no arrest for the murder has been made; however, the district attorney is reviewing the case brought against Martha.
34	8	"American Dream"	March 6, 2015	1.53
Rupinder Goraya, her husband Kultar, and their two-year-old son Devyn came to Fort Myers, Florida, from India on a work permit. Rupinder had hoped to start a career and also help out her family back home. After developing a cancerous mass and taking a leave from work, she disappeared. Those who knew her said she might leave the abusive Kultar, but would not leave Devyn. Kultar had called his friend Saroop around the time of Rupinder's disappearance, but stated it was to research opening a restaurant. Not long after that, Kultar put Devyn up for adoption. He also stayed in the country on his wife's visa. He has since stated that his wife left the country, but all of her identifying papers were found in the Fort Myers house. Saroop was questioned in 2014 and stated Kultar called him at the time to ask for an alibi. The state's attorney issued an arrest for Kultar. He was found guilty of second-degree murder in 2016.
35	9	"The Alley"	April 10, 2015	1.20
Norman West, a well-liked young man, is found murdered and dumped in a Hialeah, Florida, alleyway. The Cold Justice team ends up with 2 likely suspects, Larry Jackson and Latarsha Johnson, both of whom had taken life insurance policies out on the victim. The investigative team scheduled an appointment to present their case to the prosecutor.
36	10	"Devoted"	April 17, 2015	1.35
Marie Carlson, a mother of two, mysteriously vanishes from Fort Walton Beach, Florida, then several people receive a cryptic group text from her three days later then never hear from her again. Investigation reveals that Marie had been living in a secret polygamous relationship with the pastor of her church and his wife, James and Tanya Flanders. After determining that Marie was not a missing person, but must have been murdered, the Cold Justice team focus on James and Tanya Flanders as their suspects. At the end of the episode, the prosecutor's office agreed to review the case. James Flanders was arrested in May 2015. He pleaded guilty and was sentenced to 15 years for manslaughter. As a part of his plea, he agreed to lead authorities to Marie's body, which he had buried in the yard of his former home. Her remains were positively identified.
37	11	"Lying in Wait"	April 24, 2015	1.35
In 1997, in Greenville, Ohio, Dennis Young and Kim Stephan were found shot dead inside Young's home. Stephan's ex-husband Bob and a woman named Patty Burton are the main suspects in the case. A case was made against Bob, and the DA agreed to review the file.
38	12	"Trip to Nowhere"	May 1, 2015	1.31
In Hernando County, Florida, in 1981, a daughter returns home from school to find her mother, Laverne Mackey, gone without explanation. The investigators conclude that Laverne did not leave, and was murdered. The team feels that her husband, Merl Mackey, is the only suspect. Although no case could be made during the show, because they were unable to speak to Merl, investigators later spoke to him, and he confessed.
39	13	"Justice Served"	May 8, 2015	1.14
John Walsh interviews the investigative team for their behind-the-scenes insights. Exclusive updates on past cases and questions to Kelly and Yolanda will be featured.
40	14	"Beloved Doctor"	May 15, 2015	1.04
A respected doctor in Paducah, Kentucky, Dr. Frank Shemwell, is brutally murdered and set on fire in his kitchen. Suspects include Dr. Shemwell's younger wife (Penny), her son, and her lover. The team was able to eliminate Penny's son as a suspect. Although no charges for murder have been filed, Penny has been in and out of jail for various other offenses since.
41	15	"Smoking Gun"	May 29, 2015	1.00
A college student, Stacy Dillon, is killed in his hometown of Cleveland, Tennessee. The investigative team is able to narrow the suspect list down to one - Stacy's boyfriend, Robert Houston III - but did not have sufficient evidence to make an arrest.
42	16	"The Good Life"	June 5, 2015	1.31
In 2003 in West Palm Beach, Florida, Gwen Greenblatt is cornered in her apartment and shot twice. It seems her abusive, controlling husband (Matt Greenblatt) is the murderer, but first, investigators must find who left a smoldering cigarette outside her apartment. DNA was run before the Cold Justice team gets involved. The DNA on the smoldering cigarette gets a hit on a convicted white-collar criminal who delivered pizzas, but there is also another cigarette with Gwen's husband's DNA on it. Information surfaces that Gwen told Matt the day before her murder that she was going to be filing for divorce. The team presented the case against Matt Greenblatt to their state's attorney, who liked the case, and assigned a prosecutor to keep working on it.
43	17	"Off the Beaten Path"	July 31, 2015	1.22
In 1987, Eric and Dottie Ferguson were shot multiple times inside their rural Spartanburg, South Carolina home. After visiting the crime scene, the team decides that a random intruder is incredibly unlikely, due to how remote the home was. The case builds against Eric's son Kevin, with even his brothers saying they believe that Kevin is responsible for the murders. The team takes the case to the solicitor, who likes the case, and agrees to continue reviewing it.
44	18	"Room #10"	August 7, 2015	1.53
Investigators return to Fort Myers, Florida, to work on a 22-year-old murder case of a woman found shot in the head, covered in bloody sheets and dumped behind a community recreation center. In late-July 2017, Angelo E. Ruth pleaded guilty to the second-degree murder of Mattie Henry and was sentenced to 11 years in prison.
45	19	"The Escape"	August 14, 2015	1.14
In 1985 in Oregon County, Missouri, Brenda Dunham, a young mother caught in an abusive relationship disappeared. The team must investigate whether or not she left town by her own design. After finding that she never picked up her last payroll check, the team feels that Brenda did not leave on her own. Their only suspect is her husband, Jeff. By the end of the episode, the team has built a case against Jeff, and present it to the prosecutor's office. The prosecutor agrees to review the case.
46	20	"Up In Flames"	August 21, 2015	1.27
The team heads to Johnson County, Iowa to work with the sheriff's office on the 1995 case of a mother and gifted artist (Sue Kersten) who was found dead in her car after an explosion. Her boyfriend's (Steven Klein) violent characteristics come to light, and the team takes the case against him to their county attorney. An arrest warrant is issued, and Steve is arrested. In February 2017, Steven made an Alford plea to willful injury causing serious injury, second-degree arson, and suborning perjury, although he was originally charged with first-degree murder. He was sentenced to a maximum of 15 years in prison.
47	21	"Trajectory"	August 28, 2015	1.45
In 2012, Ben Cooper is found dead of an apparent suicide by his wife, Samantha Price. Investigators are immediately suspicious because of the location of the gun shot to the back of Ben's head. Samantha is the only suspect for the team. After determining that it was highly unlikely that Ben shot himself in the back of the head, the team focuses on building a case against Samantha. The prosecuting attorney decides to take the case against Samantha to a grand jury, and she was arrested. In December 2016, Samantha was sentenced to 15 years in prison for voluntary manslaughter.
48	22	"Justice Served"	September 4, 2015	0.99
John Walsh interviews the investigative team for their behind-the-scenes insights. Exclusive updates on past cases and questions to Kelly and Yolanda were featured.
49	23	"In The Neighborhood, Part 1"	September 11, 2015	1.28
In 1992 in White Settlement, Texas, Laura Walsh was sexually assaulted and stabbed to death in her home. Months later, two young men, Gene Giddens & Jonathan "Keith" Durington, have their throats slashed in the same neighborhood. All 3 victims were set on fire after their deaths. Investigators call in the team to determine if these two cases are potentially connected. Years later, DNA from Laura's sexual assault kit matches Donald Wright. He denies knowing Laura or being at the scene. The team feels he is responsible, but wants to wait to present the case to the DA, in case he is involved in the other homicides. In August 2016, Wright was arrested for the murder of Laura Walsh.
50	24	"In The Neighborhood, Part 2"	September 18, 2015	1.16
The White Settlement, Texas, investigation continues. After interviewing a large number of suspects, the team seems to be getting nowhere, until a recorded phone call of Doughlas Wright changes the outlook of the investigation.

=== Season 4 (2017) ===
No. overall	No. in season	Title	Original release date	US viewers (millions)
51	1	"One of Our Own"	July 22, 2017	0.40
Mary Jane LeFlore of Huntsville, Texas, was last seen alive on July 19, 1991. Her skeletal remains and jewelry were found two years later, near State Highway 30. An attractive correctional officer, she was admired by fellow coworkers and prisoners alike. She had been having an affair with a coworker, to whom she revealed signs of abuse from husband Larry, also a correctional officer. Her husband was questioned at the time of her disappearance, and he admitted seeing her with another person in a car but was unable to follow them. In June 2017, Larry LeFlore was charged with her murder.
52	2	"Fresh Wounds"	July 29, 2017	0.44
Early on the morning of September 9, 2015, Norwegian-born photographer Morten Aigeltinger left his home near Charles Town, West Virginia, but never arrived for an afternoon photo shoot less than an hour away. On September 11, he was reported missing by his live-in girlfriend; three days later, his abandoned vehicle was found beside the Shenandoah River, a few miles from his farm. Both Morten's coworker and friends related tensions within the home among Morten, his girlfriend, and her mother. Records also show that, on the night of his disappearance, the girlfriend's cellphone was used near where his vehicle was later found. Investigators presented all evidence against the girlfriend to the district attorney, and his family is told that Morten is not coming home.
53	3	"A Deadly Inheritance"	August 5, 2017	0.53
On October 3, 2004, Glenn Pennie of Polk County, Oregon, prepared to travel to California to settle his deceased father's estate. His neighbor discovered Glenn's truck on his property but Glenn disappeared. The investigation, which revealed that Glenn's father had over $1 million worth of gold coins that were stolen after his death, was approached as both a missing-person case and homicide.
54	4	"Beyond the Grave"	August 12, 2017	0.61
In the series' oldest cold case from August 1975, Tye Breland of Pascagoula, Mississippi, apparently shot himself in the chest in his bedroom with a shotgun. His death was listed as a suicide and no autopsy was performed. In 2017, investigators interview friends and relatives of his wife at the time to find inconsistencies with her relating his manner of death. This discovery was presented to the district attorney.
55	5	"Home Alone"	August 19, 2017	0.48
In Hope, Arkansas, Kelly and her team investigate the murder of a young mother who was brutally executed in her home. The clues to her killer's identity may rest in the hands of her 10-year-old son who was in his bedroom at the time.
56	6	"The Widow"	September 2, 2017	0.32
In Rock Hill, South Carolina, 76 year old Cora Campbell was brutally stabbed to death in her own home on December 14, 2012. She was a recently widowed pensioner, and had a large family of 9 siblings, and one son. Suspect Terrance Staley pleaded guilty to fraud for stealing $600 from her credit card but claimed to not have anything to do with her murder. He was sentenced to 5 years in prison for the fraud.
57	7	"If I Can't Have You No One Can"	September 9, 2017	N/A
The case of Tanai Jones, a 21-year-old college student who was stabbed and shot to death in Paterson, New Jersey on November 21, 2000. Kelly and her team tackle one of their most emotional cases yet involving the murder of a beautiful college student killed in her bedroom while packing for a trip to visit her parents for Thanksgiving.
58	8	"Cabin In The Woods"	September 23, 2017	0.49
In 199, in the small village of Hannibal, Wisconsin, Taylor county, 43 year old father, Eugene A. Monte, was shot to death in his cabin.
59	9	"Dying Declaration"	September 30, 2017	0.54
In Flint, Michigan, a 1991 brazen shooting of a beloved woman right outside her home. As she died in her sister's arms, her final words could provide insight into who killed her.
60	10	"Covet"	October 28, 2017	0.40
In Lake Charles, Louisiana, 28 year old Jeff Veazea was gunned down in his car after attending church on Palm Sunday in 2002.

=== Season 5 (2018–20) ===
No. overall	No. in season	Title	Original release date	U.S. viewers (millions)
61	1	"Small Town Secrets"	August 4, 2018	0.49
On April 28, 1982, Barbara Mendez was bludgeoned to death, seemingly with a crowbar, in Minocqua, Wisconsin. Her husband Robin's family operated a furniture business that uses that type of tool. In the year prior to his wife's death, Robin began having a sexual relationship with a 14-year-old girl and wanted to marry her. However, his Assembly of God religion was staunch, concerning remarriage. The girl later told investigators that, on the night of his wife's death, Robin had told the girl that he was now "footloose and fancy free". He then coached the girl and his daughters to lie to the police. In early 2018, Robin was arrested and charged with first-degree murder in Barbara's death. In 2019, Robin was found guilty and sentenced to life in prison.
62	2	"The Professor's End"	August 11, 2018	0.55
Dawn Glanz, a BGSU professor of art history, died from a "sharp-force injury to the scalp" on May 9, 2013, at her home in Bowling Green, Ohio. Investigators suspect her husband, Bob Brown, whose statement at the time of her death had inconsistencies, and submit his case to prosecutors.
63	3	"Holding Onto Hope"	August 18, 2018	0.46
In January 2000, Dina Shoemake, a mother in Houston County, Texas, went missing; her family wonders why she would vanish and leave her child. While one assumption is that she must have been murdered, a second theory develops: that the victim is not a victim at all and voluntarily ran off with an unidentified man.
64	4	"Down by the Lake"	August 25, 2018	0.45
On March 7, 2011, Blayne Davis and two others were camping near Keystone Lake in Tulsa, Oklahoma. Two days later, his body was found on the lakeshore. Initially ruled a drowning, no charges were filed, but the case remained open. Seven years later, the cold case was closed, when investigators cleared the two others and suggested Davis passed out near the water after a night of drinking and taking Xanax and Oxycodone.
65	5	"Danger at Dawn"	September 1, 2018	0.48
On October 12, 2006, Jonathan "Wongo" Kindle's girlfriend found him shot dead in his Bailey County, Texas home. Investigators look into a possible love triangle between her, Wongo, and his cousin. However, the cousin admits they were all just good friends at the time. The girlfriend's conflicting statements in 2006 and 12 years later, along with cellphone records, help steer the case towards prosecution.
66	6	"Preacher's Mother"	September 8, 2018	0.57
Kelly and Steve Spingola investigate the brutal slaying of beloved mother Eloise Payne, who was stabbed 38 times in her Michigan home. A mysterious car spotted in the area may hold the key to identifying her killer.
67	7	"No Safe Return"	September 15, 2018	0.53
On May 20, 2015, a car belonging to George Contos was found abandoned in a carpark with personal items inside. George went missing after selling his house and organising the purchase of a truck. Detective follow the money and DNA evidence. Flagler County Sheriff's Office submitted the case for review to the State Attorney's Office.
68	8	"Bound and Burnt"	September 22, 2018	0.63
In February 2011, Donna Wilson disappeared. Friends and relatives filed a missing person report with the Osage County, Oklahoma sheriff's office a few days after she was last seen. Nearly six months later, her skeletal remains were discovered in a burnt school bus located on the property where she had lived for eight years. Officers concluded that her hands had been bound behind her, and they found what appeared to be a knotted ligature that would have been around her neck. Police suspected her boyfriend Dustin Koelliker to have killed her and arrested him in 2018 on second-degree murder charges.
69	9	"Pain in Pawhuska"	September 29, 2018	0.51
Kelly and Steve Spingola investigate the 1996 brutal slaying of Oklahoma teenager, Joannie Goodwin, after a night of cruising and partying. Could a town rumour have led to her death at the hands of a jealous other woman? Charges against Cherri Brooks were dropped without prejudice in 2019.
70	10	"The Case Behind the Billboards"	October 6, 2018	0.59
In May 1991, Kathy Page was found dead in her car in a ditch near her home in Vidor, Texas. An autopsy revealed that she had been strangled, transforming the accident investigation into a homicide one. Suspicion focused on her husband, Steve, and her father eventually placed billboards up after no criminal case was ever brought against him, inspiring the film Three Billboards Outside Ebbing, Missouri. 27 years later, Kelly and investigator Johnny Bonds help uncover new evidence which may lead to this case finally being solved, though prosecutors remain reluctant to bring charges against Steve.
71	11	"Death Among Him - Part 1"	February 16, 2019	0.45
Kelly & Tonya take on an investigation so big that it spans two episodes. They head to Wyoming to work with Carbon County Law Enforcement to look into the mysterious deaths of two women years apart, but connected by the same circle of friends.
72	12	"Death Among Him - Part 2"	February 23, 2019	0.59
In part two of their investigation, the Cold Justice team continues to investigate three mysterious deaths in Wyoming. Will they be able to finally give answers to all the families involved ?
73	13	"Backwater Bloodshed"	March 2, 2019	0.55
Kelly and Steve head into Louisiana to work with the Concordia Parish Sheriff’s Office and investigate the 2016 homicide of a 26-year-old whose body was found on the banks of the bayou. Can the team finally bring justice to his grieving family?
74	14	"Golden Years Gone"	March 9, 2019	0.59
Kelly and Abbey head to Colorado to help the Prowers County Sheriff’s Office investigate the August 1991 homicide of a beloved elderly couple. Darlene, 51 yrs old, and Curly (70 yrs old) Culbreth were brutally killed while working at their local VFW Hall. Suspects were Sean Lirley and Robert Filbeck. Robert Filbeck was arrested for murder but was not formally charged, and then released.
75	15	"A Mother's Dying Wish"	March 16, 2019	0.53
Kelly & Steve return to Hernando County, Florida to help look into the two decade old homicide (May 16, 1997) of a 21-year-old woman, Carrie Leonard, who disappeared after a late night party. Years later her body was discovered in a pine forest nearby. Key suspect was Anthony 'Tony' Ford.
76	16	"Texas Tragedy"	March 23, 2019	0.50
Kelly & Johnny Bonds work with the Jasper County Sheriff’s Department, Texas to take on the May 2012 disappearance of a 56-year-old mother, Kay L. McCoy. The investigation uncovers family drama, rumors of doomsday prepping and a daughter waiting for her mother to return. Daughter Kristina Marie Hicks, and her husband, Robery 'Trey' Hicks, were indicted for credit/debit card abuse and forgery. They are also persons of interest in her disappearance.
77	17	"Family Betrayal"	March 30, 2019	0.54
Kelly travels to Abbey Abbondandolo’s home state to work with the Idaho Falls Police Department to help investigate the August 2007 homicide of a young 21 year old mother, Stephanie Eldredge. When her body was discovered almost 3 years later outside the city, it left a family searching for her killer. Brother-in-law Kenneth Jones was charged with second-degree murder for killing Stephanie Eldredge. He pled guilty to voluntary manslaughter and concealment for her death. He also admitted alteration or destruction of evidence.
78	18	"Horror in the Home"	April 6, 2019	0.47
Kelly & Steve Spingola partner once again to work with the Potter County Sheriff’s Department in Amarillo, Texas in investigating the brutal murder of a doting mother of four on Feb 25, 1994, Jackie Hogue. Will DNA testing help them find the murderer in this 25 year old cold case and provide answers for her grieving kids? Three boys, 1 girl, and 4 dogs. One of the sons committed suicide due to grief. Husband, Jesse Hogue, is arrested for felony murder and extradited from Colorado to Texas. He committed suicide on August 9, 2020, while awaiting trial.
79	19	"Valentine's Day Violence"	March 14, 2020	0.59
Kelly Siegler and Tonya Rider aid the Fort Myers, Florida Police Department in investigating the February 2016 homicide of 26 year old mother of two Heyzel Obando. After considering the possibility of a burglary gone wrong, the team focuses on Obando's boyfriend Tony Joiner. Joiner, a former University of Florida athlete, had a history of domestic violence and infidelity. In June 2019, he was arrested for Obando's murder.
80	20	"Small Town Predator"	March 21, 2020	0.74
Kelly and Johnny team up to tackle the 1988 murder of a woman whose headless body was found at a cemetery after a night at a local bar. The patrons of the bar could hold the key to identifying her killer and getting her family justice.
81	21	"Mystery on the Mountain"	March 28, 2020	0.68
Kelly and Abbey investigate the 2012 disappearance of a young father who traveled to Idaho to attend a family reunion, but never showed up. As the list of suspects grows, can the team uncover the truth behind his vanishing?
82	22	"Double Life Discovered"	April 4, 2020	0.62
Kelly and Johnny investigate one of their oldest cases ever -- the brutal 1984 murder of an elderly storeowner known for having a wife with a violent temper. Was his death the robbery gone wrong it appeared to be, or a plot of his wife’s design.
83	23	"Digging for Answers"	April 11, 2020	0.65
Kelly and Steve head to Harney County, Oregon to help solve the October 1993 murder of a young man allegedly shot and buried by a group of dangerous criminals. John 'Jay' Sallee was just 31 years old when murdered, in this 24 year old cold case. They'll need to pit them against each other to crack the case and finally bring justice to his family. Suspects are Ed Nice, Laurie Lynn Soule, and Ken (Kimberly) Soule.
84	24	"Deadly Affairs"	April 18, 2020	0.73
Kelly and Steve investigate the 2016 homicide of a hard-working mother who was strangled to death and dumped in a ditch. Was it a random act of violence, or did her strained marriage factor in to her murder?
85	25	"A Family's Nightmare"	April 25, 2020	0.77
Kelly and Abbey search for new clues in the fatal shooting of a mother of six that was initially considered a suicide. Their investigation exposes a heart-breaking trail of secrets hidden for 25 years.
86	26	"Fatal Betrayal"	May 2, 2020	0.72
In 1997, veteran Keith Jones was murdered in Fort Myers, Florida during what an eyewitness described as a robbery gone wrong. With the help of Kelly and Abbey, police discover that the eyewitness, Michelle Jackson, had masterminded the entire scheme along with four men. In October 2019, Jackson was arrested for Jones's murder.

=== Season 6 (2021–22) ===
No. overall	No. in season	Title	Original release date	U.S. viewers (millions)
87	1	"Holiday Homicide"	July 10, 2021	0.63
88	2	"Deadly Premonition"	July 17, 2021	0.54
89	3	"A Touch of Evidence"	July 24, 2021	0.62
90	4	"Unnatural Causes"	July 31, 2021	0.52
91	5	"An Officer's Promise"	November 6, 2021	0.59
92	6	"Out In the Cold"	November 13, 2021	0.58
93	7	"A Desperate Father"	November 20, 2021	0.62
94	8	"Small Town Conspiracy"	November 27, 2021	0.56
Kelly and Abbey investigate the murder of 17-year-old Candace Hiltz in Fremont County, Colorado. Police initially focused on her mentally ill brother Jimmy, but, as the case went cold, rumors swirled of a law enforcement cover-up. In 2016, the sale of a storage unit belonging to the case's lead investigator turned up potential evidence. The investigator, Robert Dodd, was later convicted of official misconduct. Kelly and Abbey conclude the evidence was unrelated to the murder and find no evidence to suggest law enforcement was involved. Eventually, other evidence points towards Jimmy, though the family remains unconvinced.
95	9	"Sifting Through the Ashes"	December 4, 2021	0.63
96	10	"Victim or Villain?"	December 11, 2021	0.64
97	11	"Father's Day Massacre"	December 18, 2021	0.51
98	12	"Three Generations Gone"	January 1, 2022	0.67
99	13	"A Mother's Last Words"	September 3, 2022	0.45
100	14	"Shot in the Dark"	September 10, 2022	0.41
101	15	"Dangerous Rendezvous"	September 17, 2022	0.37
102	16	"For Love or Money?"	September 24, 2022	0.48
103	17	"The Key to the Crime, Part 1"	October 1, 2022	0.50
104	18	"The Key to the Crime, Part 2"	October 8, 2022	0.52

=== Season 7 (2023) ===
No. overall	No. in season	Title	Original release date	U.S. viewers (millions)
105	1	"Burning Mystery"	February 25, 2023	N/A
106	2	"Double Disappearance"	March 4, 2023	N/A
107	3	"Trail of Terror"	March 11, 2023	N/A
108	4	"On Holy Grounds"	March 18, 2023	N/A
109	5	"Deadly Abduction"	March 25, 2023	N/A
110	6	"Digging for Justice"	April 1, 2023	N/A

=== Season 8 (2024) ===
No. overall	No. in season	Title	Original release date	U.S. viewers (millions)
111	1	"Beloved Veteran"	February 24, 2024	N/A
112	2	"Silenced"	March 2, 2024	N/A
113	3	"Killer at the Door"	March 9, 2024	N/A
114	4	"Enemy Next Door"	March 16, 2024	N/A
115	5	"Some Kind of Monster"	March 23, 2024	N/A
116	6	"The Reporter"	March 30, 2024	N/A
117	7	"Stolen Beauty"	April 6, 2024	N/A
118	8	"Stabbed in the Heart"	April 13, 2024	N/A
119	9	"Bound and Gagged"	April 20, 2024	N/A
120	10	"House of Horrors (Part 1)"	April 27, 2024	N/A
121	11	"House of Horrors (Part 2)"	May 4, 2024	N/A

=== Season 9 (2025) ===
No. overall	No. in season	Title	Original release date	U.S. viewers (millions)
122	1	"Newlywed Nightmare"	September 13, 2025	N/A
Kelly and Steve Spingola investigate the 2003 murder of David Vanderzee from Kenosha County, Wisconsin. In May 2025, Vanderzee's wife Roxanna and her lover John Viskocil were arrested and charged with first-degree murder.
123	2	"Road to Nowhere"	September 20, 2025	N/A
Kelly and Lesa Hodgkins investigate the 1988 murder of Joan Bernal from Joliet, Illinois. Suspicion focuses on her abusive husband Gilbert, who claims she left during a family vacation to Texas by taking a bus from Oklahoma. No evidence has been found to support this claim, and Gilbert's own biological son told investigators that he witnessed Gilbert murdering Joan. The investigation also uncovers evidence of Gilbert's history of domestic violence towards other women. The inconsistenties in his story between original interviews and an interview done in 2025 cast further doubt on the claim that Joan left the family willingly.
124	3	"Mountain of Secrets"	September 27, 2025	N/A
Kelly and Terri Hook investigate the 1988 murder of Ronna Bremer from Ozark, Missouri. The case is complicated because the three main suspects, Ronna's husband Joel, and his brothers-in-law, are also three main witnesses. Investigators believe all three are involved somehow, but after reinterviewing them, they decided to only charge two of the men. The most compelling piece of evidence is the testimony of an anonymous witness, who says that Joel's brother-in-law David confessed to killing Ronna and hiding her body on his property. Ronna's skull was indeed found on the property a few years after the murder, but it was not identified until this witness came forward in the early 2000s.
125	4	"Final Warning"	October 4, 2025	N/A
126	5	"Deadly Message"	October 11, 2025	N/A
127	6	"A Mother's Nightmare"	October 18, 2025	N/A
128	7	"Life Cut Short"	October 25, 2025	N/A
129	8	"Final Rendezvous"	November 1, 2025	N/A
130	9	"Deadly Intersection"	November 8, 2025	N/A
131	10	"Missing in Montana"	November 15, 2025	N/A
