= Sex and the law =

Regulation by law of human sexual activity

Sex and the law deals with the regulation by law of human sexual activity. Sex laws vary from one place or jurisdiction to another, and have varied over time. Unlawful sexual acts are called sex crimes.

Some laws regarding sexual activity are intended to protect one or all participants, while others are intended to proscribe behavior that has been defined as a crime. For example, a law may proscribe unprotected sex if one person knows that they have a sexually transmitted infection or to protect a minor; or it may proscribe non-consensual sex. In general, laws may proscribe acts which are considered either sexual abuse or behavior that societies consider to be inappropriate and against the social norms. Sexual abuse is unwanted sexual contact between two or more adults or two or more minors, and, depending on laws with regard to age of consent, sexual contact between an adult and a minor.

== Definitions ==
Sex crimes are forms of human sexual behavior that are considered sufficiently unacceptable and harmful to society to be regarded as criminal. Someone who commits one is said to be a sex offender. Some sex crimes are crimes of violence that involve sex. Others are violations of social taboos, such as incest, sodomy, indecent exposure or exhibitionism. There is much variation among cultures as to what is considered a crime or not, and in what ways or to what extent crimes are punished.

Western countries are often far more tolerant of acts, such as oral sex, that have traditionally been held to be crimes in some countries, but combine this with lesser tolerance for the remaining crimes. By contrast, many cultures with a strong religious tradition consider a far broader range of activities to be serious crimes.

As a general rule, the law in many countries often intervenes in sexual activity involving young or adolescent children below the legal age of consent, non-consensual deliberate displays or illicit watching of sexual activity, sex with close relatives (incest), harm to animals, acts involving the deceased (necrophilia). Intervention may also arise when there is harassment, nuisance, fear, injury, or assault of a sexual nature, or serious risk of abuse of certain professional relationships. Separately, the law usually regulates or controls the censorship of pornographic or obscene material as well.

== Possible enforcement ==
The activities listed below carry a condition of illegality in some jurisdictions if acted upon:

- Rape, lust murder and other forms of sexual assault and sexual abuse
- Child sexual abuse
- Cybersex trafficking, trafficking and the live streaming of coerced sexual acts and/or rape on webcam
- Digital sex crime, the online posting of revenge porn or hidden camera recordings
- Forcible touching
- Frotteurism, sexual arousal through rubbing one's self against a non-consenting stranger in public
- Human trafficking
- Incest between close relatives
- Necrophilia
- Obscenity
- Exhibitionism and voyeurism, if deliberate and non-consensual, called "indecent exposure" and "peeping tom" respectively in this context.
- Various paraphilias and sexual fetishes such as transvestism
- Ownership of vibrators and other sex toys
- Prostitution and/or pimping
- Public masturbation
- Public-order crimes are crimes that interrupt the flow of daily life and business according to local community standards. Public-order crimes include paraphilias (deviancies).
- Public urination
- Sex trafficking
- Sexual acts by people in a position of trust (such as teachers, doctors and police officers), towards people under 18 which they are involved with professionally.
- Sexual harassment
- Streaking
- Sodomy
- Spousal rape
- Statutory rape
- Telephone scatologia, making obscene telephone calls for the purpose of sexual arousal
- Stealing underwear, sometimes regarded has been done in a sexual context.
- Zoophilia

A variety of laws aim to protect children by making various acts with children a sex crime. For example, the "corruption of minors" by introducing material or behaviors that are intended to groom a minor for future sexual conduct. The materials or behavior can involve sexual content but does not necessarily have to. Depending on the jurisdiction, this conduct can be charged as a felony or a misdemeanor. Sometimes these laws overlap with age of consent laws, laws preventing the exposure of children to pornography, laws making it a crime for a child to be involved in (or exposed to) certain sexual behaviors, and the production and ownership of child pornography (sometimes including simulated images). In some countries such as the UK, the age for child pornography is higher than the age of consent, hence child pornography laws also cover images involving consenting adults.

Sadomasochistic conduct among adults can fall into a legal grey area. Some jurisdictions criminalize some or all sadomasochistic acts, regardless of legal consent and impose liability for any injuries caused. (See Consent (BDSM)) Other jurisdictions permit sadomasochistic conduct so long as the participants consent to the conduct.

== Consent ==
=== Age of consent ===
While the phrases "age of consent" or "statutory rape" typically do not appear in legal statutes, when used in relation to sexual activity, the age of consent is the minimum age at which a person is considered to be legally competent of consenting to engage in sexual acts. This should not be confused with the age of majority, age of criminal responsibility, or the marriageable age.

Some jurisdictions forbid sexual activity outside of legal marriage completely. The relevant age may also vary by the type of sexual act, the sex of the actors, or other restrictions such as abuse of a position of trust. Some jurisdictions may make allowances for minors engaged in sexual acts with each other, rather than a hard and fast single age. Charges resulting from a breach of these laws may range from a relatively low-level misdemeanor such as "corruption of a minor", to "statutory rape" (which is considered equivalent to rape, both in severity and sentencing).

== Extramarital sex ==
Adultery is a crime in many Muslim countries, such as Saudi Arabia, Pakistan, Afghanistan, Iran, Kuwait, Maldives, Morocco, Oman, Mauritania, United Arab Emirates, Qatar, Sudan, and Yemen.

== Female genital mutilation ==
Custom and tradition are the most frequently cited reasons for female genital mutilation (FGM). FGM is the removal of the genitals, especially in Islamic culture perpetuating male domination. Approximately 125 million girls and women are victims of female genital mutilation throughout the world. With the practices often being performed to exert control over the sexual behavior of girls and women or as a perceived aesthetic improvement to the appearance of their genitalia. The World Health Organization (WHO) is one of many health organizations that have campaigned against the procedures on behalf of human rights, stating that "FGM has no health benefits" and that it is "a violation of the human rights of girls and women" and "reflects deep-rooted inequality between the sexes".

Most countries prohibit female genital mutilation, including prohibiting the procedure to be performed on its citizens and residents while outside their jurisdictions, and the New York State Penal Law lists female genital mutilation as a sexual offense.

== Incest ==
Sexual activity between family members or close relatives is often considered incest, which is illegal in many jurisdictions, though what constitutes an "incestuous relationship" varies by jurisdiction, and may depend on the type of sexual activity and whether the relationship is one of consanguinity, affinity or other relationship, such as by adoption. In law, the proscribed sexual activity is usually limited to sexual intercourse, though terminology varies, and which in some jurisdictions is limited to penile-vaginal sexual intercourse. Incestuous sexual activity, as defined by each jurisdiction, is usually unlawful irrespective of the consent of the parties and irrespective of their age. This prohibition usually also extends to the marriage of people in the proscribed incestuous relationships.

One author argued that use of particular language devices and rhetoric in the legislation surrounding these laws manipulates the viewer to automatically deem such sexual acts to be immoral and criminal. In this view, the law is attempting to morally control society, which is not one of the purposes of the law. This means that people will condemn those who partake in familial sexual activities, even if all parties are consenting adults.

== LGBT rights ==
In some states, sex between members of the same sex, or between men, is illegal. In a report done in 2013, the International Lesbian, Gay, Bisexual, Trans and Intersex Association (ILGA) indicated that homosexuality is still criminalized in some form in 76 states, with a high concentration of these states in the Middle East, Africa, and parts of Asia. Scholars have found that religion plays an important role in the legislation criminalizing sodomy. Countries that are predominately Muslim, for example, are less likely to decriminalize acts of sodomy as these acts are in direct contradiction with Islamic traditions. While quantitative research has not proven a link between the continued criminalization of sodomy and Christianity, there are many Protestant denominations, as well as the Catholic Church, that oppose the practice of homosexuality. While one might expect that the decriminalization of sodomy laws would support the mobilization of lesbian and gay rights, this is not necessarily the case, as there is debate on whether or a direct link exists between the two. In legislation regarding sodomy, there is typically no explicit statements given in the support of gay and lesbian rights since the reforms generally the result of a large emendation to penal code. There is some evidence in support of the opposite effect, as the re-criminalization of sodomy in India in 2013 caused a resurgence of gay rights activism.

In studying the changes of sodomy statutes, Frank et al. (2009) found that between 1945 and 2005, "90 percent of all modifications involved liberalization in some way" of non-heterosexual acts. This was seen as evidence of a "sodomy-law reform wave." During the same period, however, eight countries expanded their laws regarding sodomy. In January 2014, Nigeria expanded their criminalization of homosexuality by passing legislation to enforce more severe penalties including a ban against same-sex marriage and participation in any gay organizations. Sodomy laws, however, are rarely used to penalize consensual acts, involving adults, that occur in private. In the 1970s, the only arrests (in the US) involving consensual, non-heterosexual acts were in public or quasi-public. While many sodomy laws are concerned with sexual acts as opposed to sexual orientations, the legislation is often interpreted as if being gay or lesbian is sufficient evidence to deem someone guilty as to having engaged in criminal acts. This led US judges to deny parents' custody of their children, student groups were not granted recognition by university officials, and many legislators were opposed to civil rights bills that included sexual orientation.

Many revisions to sodomy laws were not a part of large government transitions, but rather included as a part of other general revisions of criminal legislation. There are two main pathways in which sodomy laws have been decriminalized: judicial invalidation and repeal of the law by vote of legislation. The United States did not decriminalize sodomy nationwide until 2003; however, many states, based on the council of judges and lawyers, did decriminalize sodomy as early as 1961.

During the rise of Putin, Russia has seen a resurgence in "religious conservatism" which has resulted in the indirect re-criminalizing homosexuality. An amendment was made to Russian legislation in 2013 that emphasizes the protection of children from information that could be deemed as damaging to their mental health and development. In the amendment to the Federal Law of Russian Federation no. 436-FZ, "propaganda" of non-traditional sexual relationships among minors was classified as harmful, and while the law does not criminalize homosexuality directly, it has created a hostile environment for LGBT activism. The US and Europe have condemned Russia's actions, but despite the domestic and international pushback, the Russian anti-LGBT propaganda law still stands.

== See also ==
- Carnal knowledge
- Criminal transmission of HIV
- Lawrence v. Texas
- Islamic sexual jurisprudence
- "Sex Shouldn't Be a Crime"
