= Joshua Day =

American model and male beauty pageant titleholder

- Born: Joshua Day; 1986 (age 39–40); Miami, Florida, United States
- Beauty pageant titleholder
- Title: Mister Universe Model 2009
- Hair color: Short Dark
- Eye color: Brown
- Major competitions: Mister Universe Model 2009 (Winner)

Joshua Day (born 1986) is an American male pageant winner who was crowned Mister Universe Model 2009 in Punta Cana, Dominican Republic. He is the first American to get the title of Men Universe Model in the history of the pageant.

== Pageantry ==
=== Mister Universe Model 2009 ===
Day was crowned as Mister Universe Model 2009 represented the United States of America in Punta Cana, Dominican Republic on April 24, 2009. He overcame the other 23 contestants to win the Men Universe Model.

=== Post-pageant ===
Day has since appeared on the pages of “DNA” magazine and has been photographed by Rick Day. As of 2012, Day lives in New York and signed with Ford Models NY and 301 Models.
