= Kat Reeder =

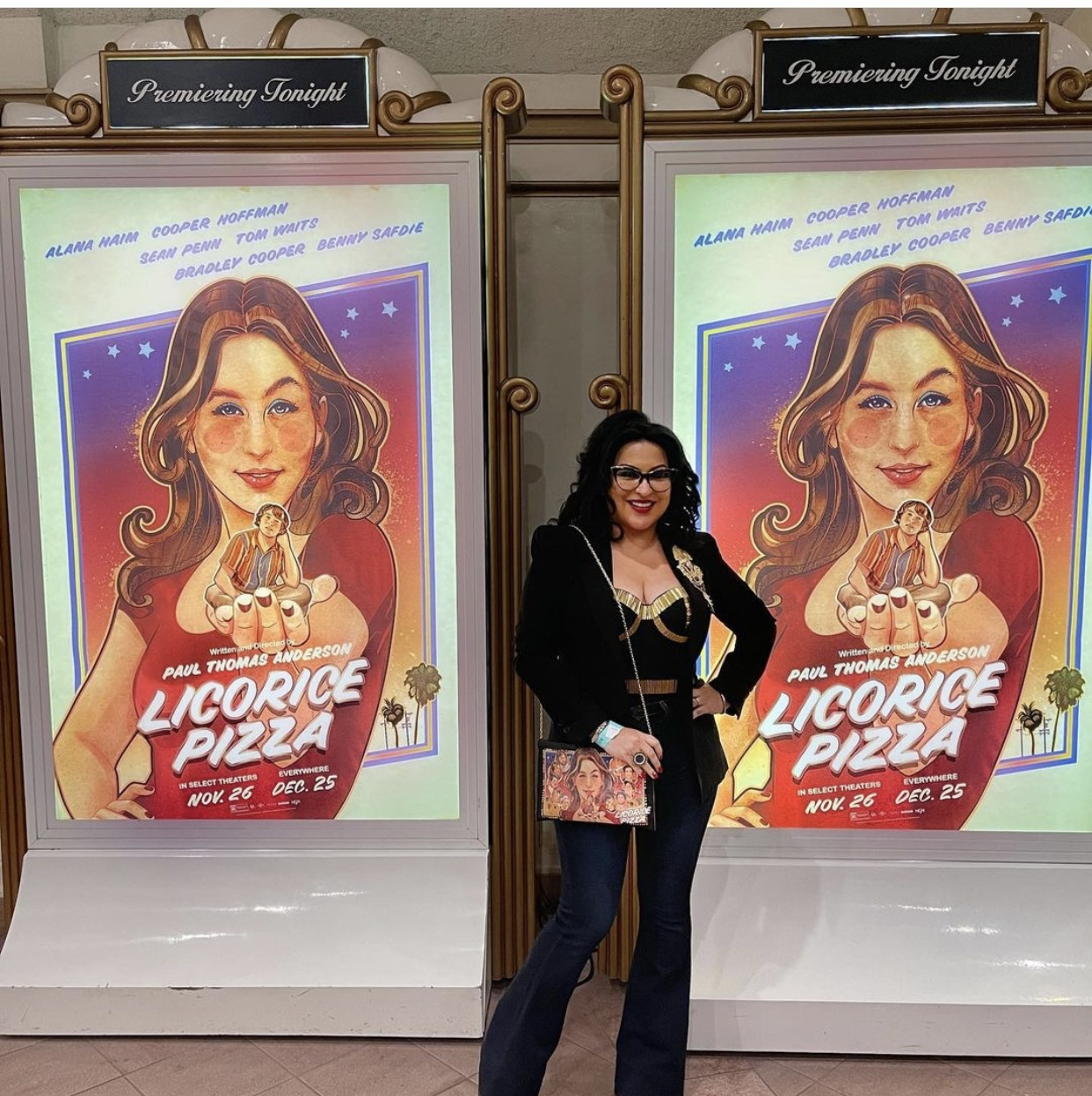
Kat Reeder next to her Licorice Pizza poster design in Los Angeles.

Kat Reeder is a Peruvian-American illustrator, portrait artist, and graphic designer. Her work combines elements of pop art, animation, art nouveau, and Latin American art styles. Reeder was born in Lima, Peru, grew up in Miami, Florida, and now lives in Honolulu, Hawaii. Michael Bierut, famed graphic designer and partner at Pentagram, has described Reeder's poster art as "brilliant," calling it "...the kind of delirious synthesis of concept, style and execution that got me crazily excited when I first became aware of graphic design as a teenager." Reeder has been profiled by The Los Angeles Times, El Comercio and La Republica in her native country, Peru, and other media in Japan and around the world.

Kat Reeder's works have been shown in galleries in Hawaii, Japan, Australia, and throughout the American mainland from Southern California to Miami. She has worked with major corporate clients including Starwood Hotels, Sony, The PGA Tour, Vans, and LeSportsac. Her illustrations have been published in both local and national publications, including Hawaii Magazine and Exotica Moderne. In 2021 she was also commissioned for a private fashion illustration event by Louis Vuitton Hawaii. Her work can be seen in album and poster designs for musical acts such as Hirie and Raiatea Helm in her home state of Hawaii, as well as Grammy nominees Ozomatli.

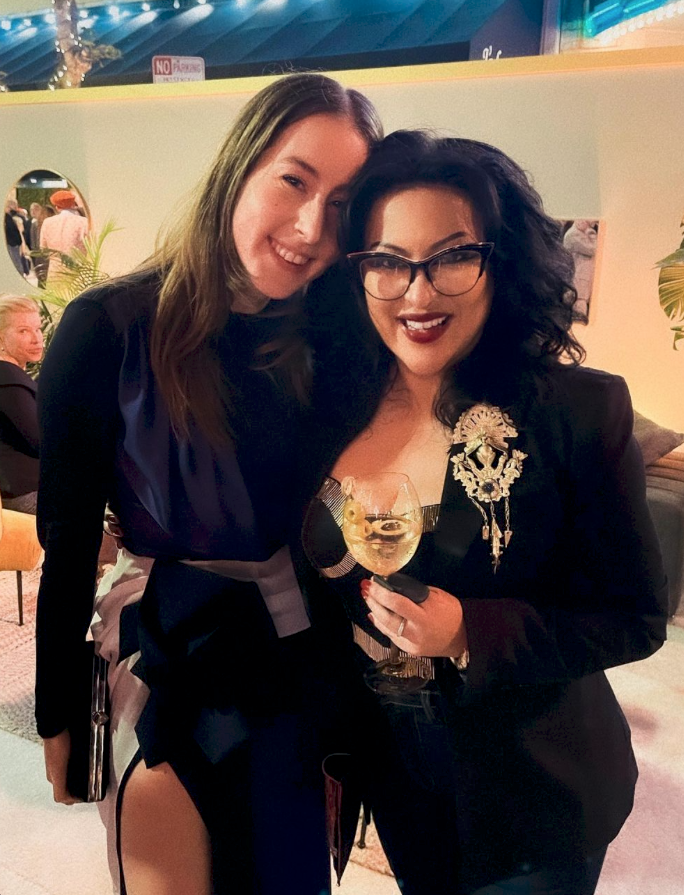
Alana Haim and Kat Reeder at Licorice Pizza Premiere

Reeder began work as an illustrator shortly after moving to Honolulu in 2009. She scored her first solo show in August of that year. Her show caught the attention of the organizer of The Van's Triple Crown of Surfing, who commissioned Reeder to illustrate the poster for the upcoming event. Due to the poster's vintage vibe that expressed Hawaii's surfing heyday in the 1970s, it became a popular local image. Reeder's work began selling in Hawaii, Australia, Japan, and California shortly thereafter.

In 2012, she was tapped to design a line of Hawaii-exclusive bags for LeSportsac. The project led to a number of write-ups in the local press. This allowed Reeder to expand her business to include more illustration work for major hotel chains such as Fairmont, Sheraton, and Westin, as well as the famed historic Waikiki hotels, The Royal Hawaiian and The Moana Surfrider. She has continued to work with corporate clients and expanded her repertoire to include highly sought-after custom portraits, with waiting lists sometimes extending well over a year.

In 2021, Reeder was commissioned by filmmaker Paul Thomas Anderson to create poster art and other key art for his film Licorice Pizza, starring Alana Haim, Cooper Hoffman, Bradley Cooper, Sean Penn, Bennie Safdie, Tom Waits, and Maya Rudolph. Reeder's work was used as the primary movie poster, and as advertising throughout Los Angeles, New York, and cities world-wide.

Reeder lives in Honolulu, Hawaii with her son and her husband Adam Reeder.
