= Scott James Meyer =

American writer (born 1981)

- Scott James Meyer at Yale Divinity School
- Born: 1981 (age 44–45); Miami, Florida, U.S.

Scott James Meyer (born 1981) is an American attorney and former stand-up comedian. As an attorney, he is a specialist in international criminal law. He has described himself as being “very concerned with constitutional protections and fair play in the legal system” and against solitary confinement in prisons. While a comedian, Meyer's 2009 live album "Talking Behind Your Back" placed in the top five Bandcamp.com stand-up comedy album downloads after its independent release. He got his start in stand-up at the Workplay Theatre in downtown Birmingham, Alabama. Meyer is the author of the book BlueBloody: motivational memoirs of an ivy league high school dropout.
