= Clandestine Culture =

American artist

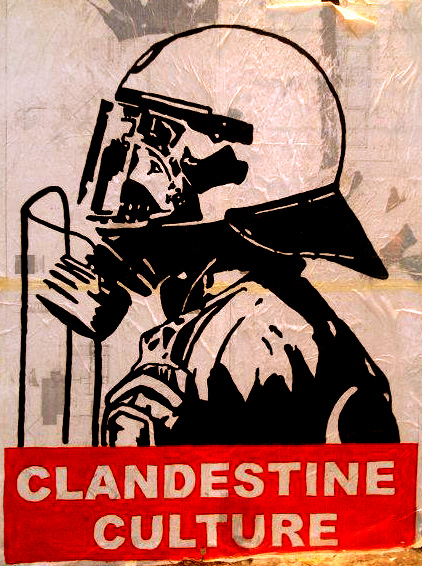
- street art by CLANDESTINE CULTURE
- Born: 1970 (age 55–56)
- Occupation: Contemporary artist
- Known for: Street art Installation art

Clandestine Culture (stylized as CLANDESTINE CULTURE) is an American contemporary artist working in Miami, Florida. His first solo gallery exhibition was in 2012.

== Early life ==
Clandestine Culture was born in 1970 and moved to Miami in the early 1990s.

== Career ==
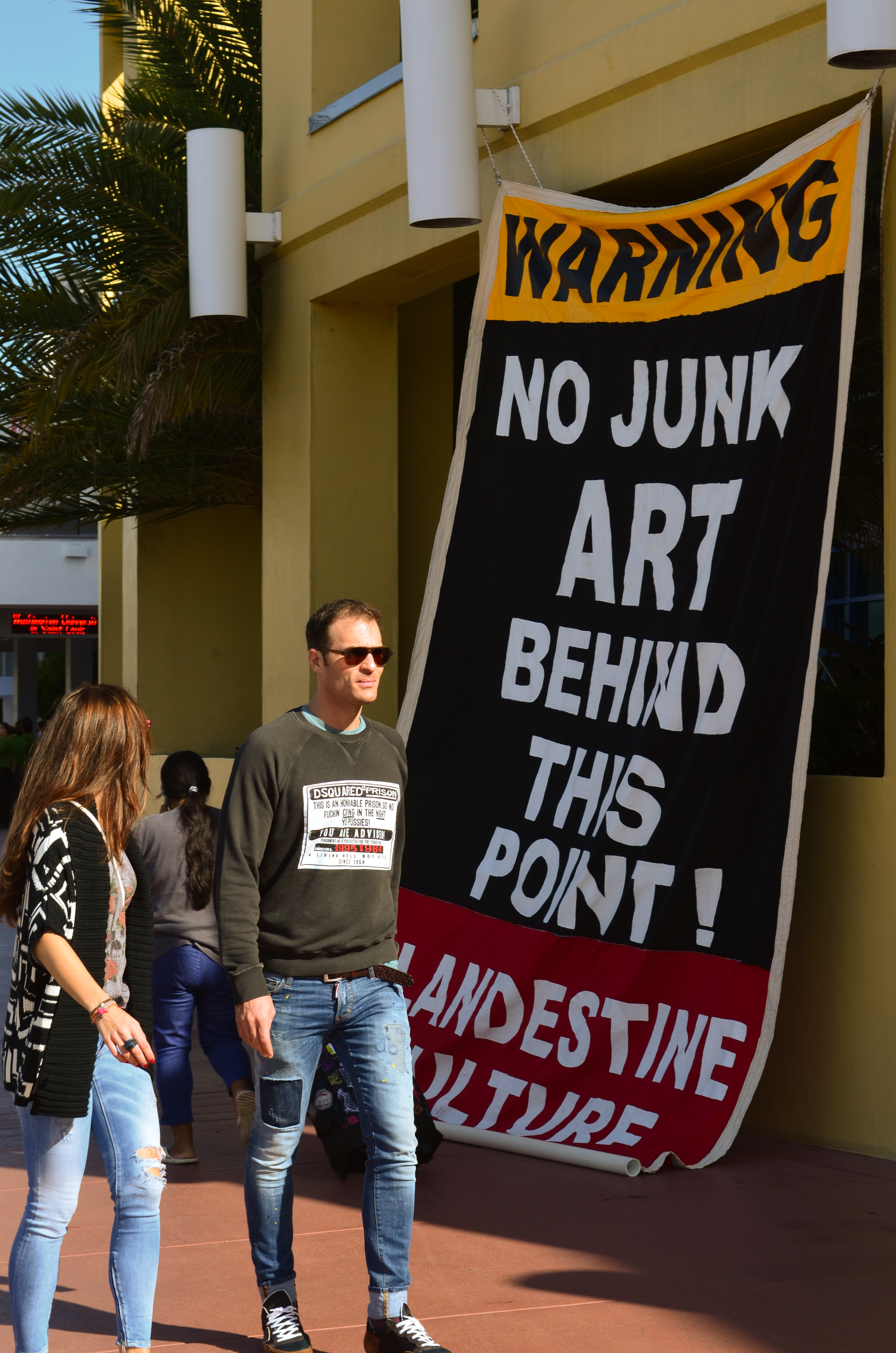
"The Banner Project" displayed in front of Miami Beach Convention Center during Art Basel Miami Beach in Miami Beach in December 2014

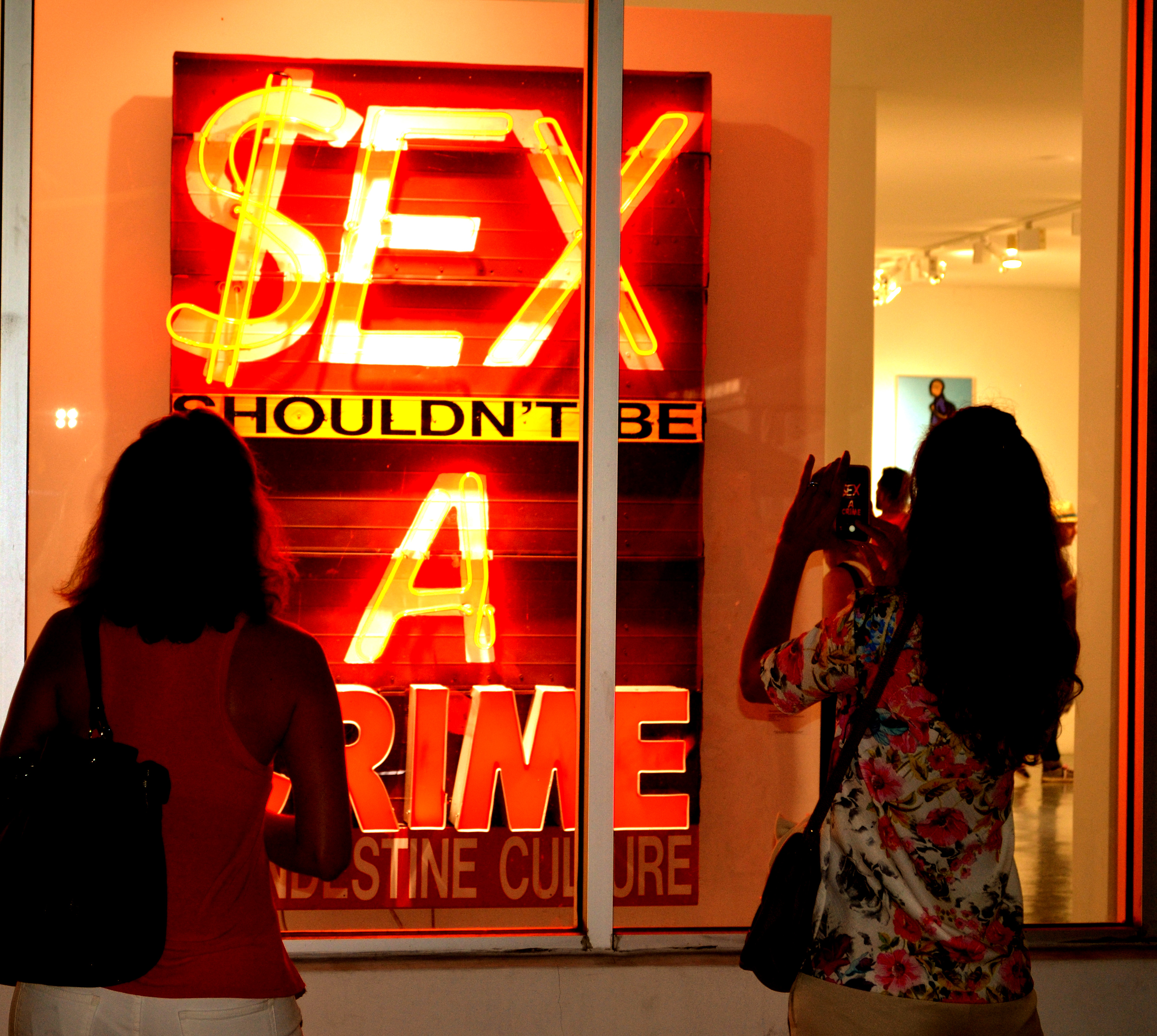
"Sex Shouldn't Be a Crime", a Clandestine Culture display at the Gregg Shienbaum Fine Art gallery in July 2015

Clandestine Culture began working as an urban artist in 2000, expressing strong social criticism and portraying taboo subjects often in disturbing or controversial ways. His works are produced in a variety of mediums, including paper, canvas, neon, and banners.

In 2012, he had his first solo show. He has had several group exhibitions.

In 2013, he took part at the Scope Art Fair during "Art Basel Miami Beach".

Culture has also produced street art. Large format images are painted on paper with latex paint, and are glued to walls using the wheatpaste method.

On July 20, 2013, Culture created the Banner Project, which raises or hangs flags around Miami as art installations. The first flag was raised over Julia Tuttle Causeway. The banner was 10 ft x 16 ft, constructed of synthetic fabric, and painted with latex paint. It featured a black and white image of a police officer in riot gear with a red "Clandestine Culture" logo stamped at the bottom. It was raised on high-mast lighting, at a height of 30 metres (98 ft). The flag remained for five days until it was removed by the Florida Highway Patrol.

In 2014, his second solo show was presented at the Gregg Shienbaum Fine Art gallery. He works in many different formats; from painting and sculpture to street art installations.

In summer 2014, another Banner Project took place at the Miami Marine Stadium. The size and materials were similar to the one used on Julia Tuttle Causeway the summer before.

In December 2014, Culture displayed another piece in front of the Miami Beach Convention Center during Art Basel Miami Beach in 2014.

== Exhibitions ==
- Gregg Shienbaum Fine Art gallery on October 12, 2012
- Gregg Shienbaum Fine Art gallery on May 8, 2014
