= List of Loyola Marymount University people =

Here follows a list of notable alumni and faculty of Loyola Marymount University in Los Angeles, California, United States.

== Alumni ==
=== Film and television ===
- Emily Bader, actress, People We Meet on Vacation (film), My Lady Jane, Fresh Kills (film), Paranormal Activity: Next of Kin
- John Bailey, cinematographer, film director and former president of the Academy of Motion Picture Arts and Sciences, Ordinary People, Groundhog Day, He's Just Not That Into You
- Bob Beemer, Academy Award-winning sound mixer, Speed, Gladiator, Ray, Dreamgirls
- Maria Blasucci, actress, writer Mascots, Ghost Ghirls
- Barbara Broccoli, producer, the James Bond film series
- Effie T. Brown, producer, Dear White People, But I'm a Cheerleader, Real Women Have Curves
- Tony Bui, film director, Three Seasons
- Jennifer Candy, producer and actress, known for In Vino (2019), Liv and Maddie (2013) and Where's This Party? (2014); daughter of John Candy
- Linda Cardellini, actress, Scooby-Doo, ER, Freaks and Geeks, Dead to Me
- Mindy Cohn, actress, The Facts of Life
- Carson Daly (dropped out), television personality, Total Request Live, Last Call with Carson Daly
- Dana Davis, actress, voice actress, and novelist. Prom Night, Heroes, Franklin and Bash, 10 Things I Hate About You, Craig of the Creek, Star vs. the Forces of Evil
- Bob Denver, actor, Gilligan's Island, The Many Loves of Dobie Gillis
- Clark Duke, actor, Greek, Clark and Michael
- Scott Eastwood, actor, Gran Torino, Fury; son of Clint Eastwood
- Don Eitner, actor, Mackenzie's Raiders
- Chase Ellison, actor, Tooth Fairy, The Boy Who Cried Werewolf
- David Mickey Evans, film and television director and writer, The Sandlot, Radio Flyer
- Lauren Froderman, dancer, winner of So You Think You Can Dance, season 7
- Scott Gairdner, comedy writer and director; creator of Moonbeam City
- Jack Haley Jr. (B.A. English 1956), Emmy-winning television and film writer, director, and producer; former president of Fox Television
- Colin Hanks, actor, Orange County; son of Tom Hanks
- Emily Harper, actress, Passions
- Brian Helgeland (M.A. 1986), Academy Award-winning screenwriter and film director, L.A. Confidential, Mystic River
- Dwayne Hickman, actor, The Many Loves of Dobie Gillis
- Kaliko Kauahi, actress, Superstore
- Gloria Calderón Kellett, writer and actress, co-showrunner of One Day at a Time
- Chris Kobin (LLS), film and television writer and producer, Hollywood Don't Surf!
- Mila Kunis, actress, That '70s Show, Family Guy, Forgetting Sarah Marshall, Black Swan
- Christopher Landon, film director and writer, Happy Death Day, Freaky, Paranormal Activity: The Marked Ones
- Francis Lawrence (B.A. 1991), film director, I Am Legend
- Emma Lockhart, actress, Batman Begins, Ace Ventura, Jr.: Pet Detective
- Holly Madison, television personality, The Girls Next Door
- Jason Mann, film director and screenwriter, The Leisure Class
- Stephen McEveety, film producer, Braveheart, The Passion of the Christ
- Sean McNamara, film and television director and producer, Bratz, That's So Raven
- Dave Meyers, film and music video director, The Hitcher
- Kate Micucci (B.A. 2003), actress, singer, and songwriter, Garfunkel and Oates
- David Mirkin (B.A. 1978), Emmy-winning television producer, The Simpsons
- Beverley Mitchell, actress, 7th Heaven
- Glen Morgan, Emmy-nominated television and film writer, director, and producer, The X-Files, The Final Destination
- John Stewart Muller, film director and screenwriter, Fling, Indiscretion
- Lance Mungia, film director, Six-String Samurai
- Taylour Paige, dancer, actress, Hit The Floor
- Van Partible, television writer, producer, Johnny Bravo
- Busy Philipps, actress, Freaks and Geeks, Dawson's Creek, White Chicks, Cougar Town
- Tony Plana, actor, Ugly Betty
- Jessica Rey, actress, Power Rangers: Wild Force
- Leon Robinson, actor, singer, producer; Cool Runnings, The Temptations, Above the Rim, OZ, A Day To Die (2022)
- Steve Rossi, actor, part of the Allen & Rossi comedy duo
- Ava Sambora, actress; daughter of Richie Sambora and Heather Locklear
- Devin Sarno (B.A. 1988), composer, video producer
- Stassi Schroeder, participant in The Amazing Race 8, cast member of Queen Bees and Vanderpump Rules
- Chris Sullivan (B.A. 2002), actor, The Knick
- Daniel J. Travanti (M.A. 1978), actor, Hill Street Blues
- Anton Vassil, film director, Marching Out of Time, Laurent et Safi
- Cerina Vincent, actress, Power Rangers Lost Galaxy, Cabin Fever
- Victor Vu, film director, producer, writer; Dreamy Eyes, The Immortal, Yellow Flowers on the Green Grass
- Michael Wayne, film producer; son of John Wayne
- Patrick Wayne, actor; son of John Wayne
- James Wong, Emmy-nominated television and film writer, director, and producer, The X-Files, The Final Destination

=== Literature ===
- Luis Aguilar-Monsalve, writer and educator, Daryl R. Karns Award for Scholarly and Creative Activity
- Richard C. Laymon, horror author; books include The Cellar and The Beast House
- Lisa See, writer; books include On Gold Mountain, Shanghai Girls, Snow Flower and the Secret Fan

=== Music ===
- Jason Bentley, music director for KCRW
- Victor Damiani, former bassist for alternative rock bands Cake and Deathray
- Eric Erlandson, former lead guitarist for alternative rock band Hole
- Elvin Estela, hip hop producer and DJ
- Jauz, EDM artist
- Tiffany Day, singer-songwriter, electronic producer and DJ
- Rochelle Hoi-Yiu Kwan, DJ, founder of Chinatown Records, community organizer
- Matt Maust, bass player of Cold War Kids
- Whitney Phillips, songwriter
- Jonnie Russell, former vocalist and multi-instrumentalist of Cold War Kids
- Michael Shuman, bass player for the Queens of the Stone Age
- Jimmy Tamborello, keyboard player and percussionist of The Postal Service, producer
- Mark Volman, singer and songwriter for The Turtles, The Mothers of Invention, and Flo & Eddie
- Omid Walizadeh, hip hop producer
- Nathan Willet, vocalist and multi-instrumentalist of Cold War Kids

=== Politics ===
- Bill Bogaard, mayor of Pasadena, California
- Bill Campbell, politician and former California State Assembly Republican Leader
- Benjamin Cayetano, former governor of Hawaii (1994–2002)
- Tony Coelho, former Democratic member of the United States House of Representatives from California and Democratic majority whip
- Bob Dornan, former Republican member of the United States House of Representatives from California
- Lena Gonzalez, member of the California State Senate
- Kim Hee-kyung, former Vice Minister of Gender Equality and Family in South Korea
- Kevin Kiley, U.S. Representative from California
- Kimberlyn King-Hinds, delegate to the United States House of Representatives from Northern Mariana Islands' at-large congressional district
- Alejandro Mayorkas, former United States Secretary of Homeland Security (2021-2025) and United States attorney for the Central District of California (1998-2001) (J.D. graduate of Loyola Law School)
- Rudy Sablan, former lieutenant governor of Guam (1975–1979)
- Helen Singleton, civil rights activist and Freedom Rider
- Louis Vitale, priest and peace activist

=== Law ===
- Johnnie Cochran, attorney; defended O. J. Simpson (J.D. graduate of Loyola Law School)
- Lynn Compton, former prosecutor, superior court judge, and appellate court judge; lead prosecutor in the case against Sirhan Sirhan who assassinated Robert F. Kennedy; awarded a Silver Star in World War II
- Mark Geragos, J.D. 1982, high-profile defense attorney (graduate of Loyola Law School)
- Tom Girardi, attorney, founding partner of Girardi & Keese, earned a reputation as L.A. County's "king of the class action lawsuit"
- Ronald S.W. Lew, attorney, judge
- Carmen Milano, Cleveland lawyer, eventually disbarred, later became a Mafia member
- Robert Shapiro, high-profile defense attorney; defended O. J. Simpson with Cochran (graduate of Loyola Law School)

=== Business ===
- John Edward Anderson, president of Topa Equities, Ltd.; ranked #189 on the Forbes 400 Richest Americans list
- Jerry Grundhofer, former CEO of US Bancorp; previously ranked as the second highest paid executive in the banking industry
- Tom Mueller (M.S. '92), co-founder and VP of rocket propulsion at SpaceX
- John Seidler, chairman of the San Diego Padres Major League Baseball team
- John Stankey, COO/CEO of AT&T, graduated with a B.A. in finance
- Wilfred Von der Ahe, co-founder of Vons supermarket chain
- Henry C. Yuen, co-founder, former CEO, and chairman of Gemstar-TV Guide International (graduate of Loyola Law School)
- Matthew K. Saito, 2022 graduate

=== Science ===
- Steven C. Hayes, psychologist, creator of acceptance and commitment therapy
- LaShyra Nolen, medical student and science communicator; first black woman to be elected class president of the Harvard Medical School

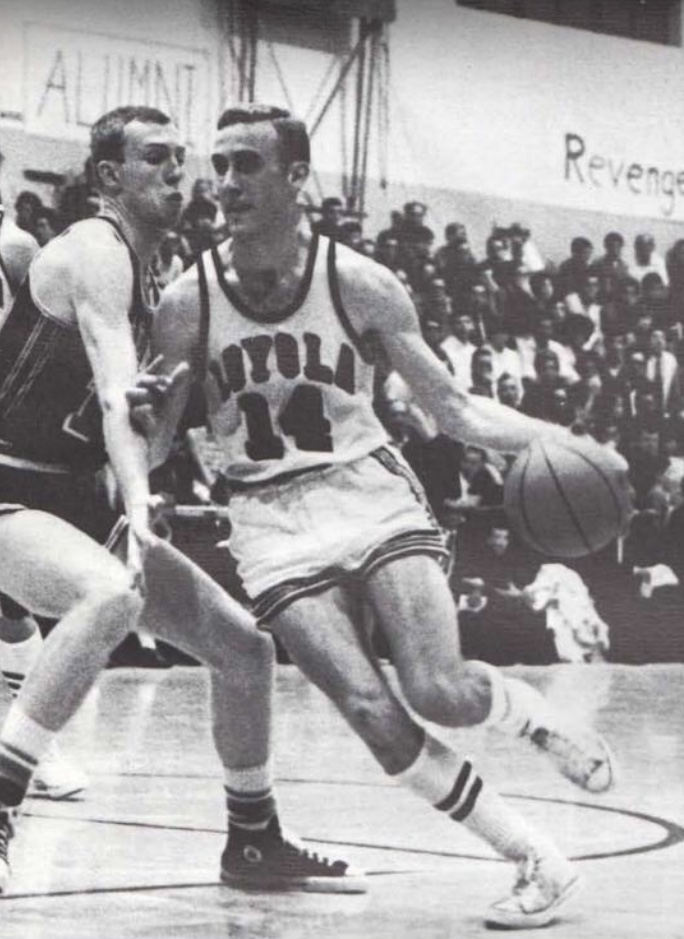
Rick Adelman

=== Sports ===
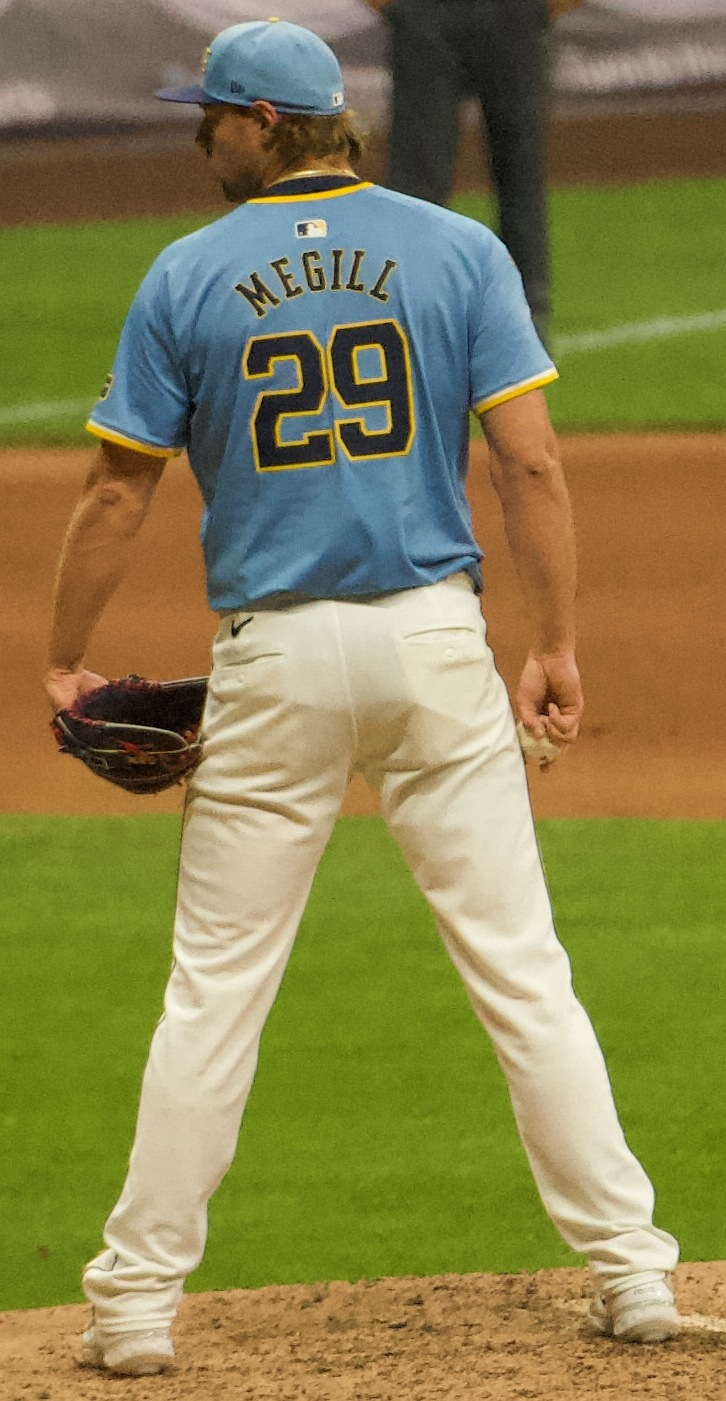
Trevor Megill

- Rick Adelman, former National Basketball Association guard and coach
- Jean-Paul Afif, basketball player and coach
- Chuck Baker, former Major League Baseball infielder
- Billy Bean, former Major League Baseball outfielder
- Jim Bruske, former Major League Baseball pitcher
- Chris Donnels, former Major League Baseball infielder
- Michael Erush (born 1984), soccer player and coach
- David Fletcher, former Major League Baseball infielder
- Corey Gaines (born 1965), basketball player and coach
- Hank Gathers, college basketball player who led NCAA division 1 in the 1988–1989 season in scoring and rebounding; died midgame in 1990
- Tracy Jones, former Major League Baseball outfielder
- Matthew Knight, former National Basketball League forward
- Gregory "Bo" Kimble, former National Basketball Association guard
- Tim Layana, former Major League Baseball pitcher and World Series Champion
- Terrell Lowery, former Major League Baseball outfielder
- Damian Martin, former National Basketball League guard
- Trevor Megill, Major League Baseball pitcher for the Milwaukee Brewers
- Dick Moje, National Football League player
- Pete Newell, Hall of Fame basketball coach
- Maury Nipp, former National Football League player
- Chris Pettit, former Major League Baseball outfielder
- Bob Sheldon, former Major League Baseball infielder
- Keith Smith, retired basketball player
- Nick Sogard, Major League Baseball infielder for the Boston Red Sox
- Jeff Stevens, former Major League Baseball pitcher
- Billy Traber, former Major League Baseball pitcher
- Brian Turang, former Major League Baseball player
- Ryan Wheeler, former Major League Baseball infielder
- Josh Whitesell, former Major League Baseball first baseman
- C.J. Wilson, former Major League Baseball pitcher
- Phil Woolpert, Hall of Fame basketball coach

=== Religion ===
- Most Reverend Gordon Bennett, S.J., D.D., Bishop Emeritus of Mandeville (Roman Catholic Church)
- Most Reverend Cirilo Flores, bishop of San Diego (Roman Catholic Church)
- His Eminence Jean-Baptiste Phạm Minh Mẫn, archbishop emeritus of Saigon (Roman Catholic Church)
- Jean Dolores Schmidt, BVM (better known as Sister Jean), chaplain for the men's basketball team of Loyola University Chicago; became a major media celebrity during the team's 2018 Final Four run (M.A., 1961)

== Faculty ==
- Most Reverend Gordon Bennett, S.J., D.D., bishop emeritus of Mandeville, Peter Faber, S.J. fellow in Pastoral Theology and Ignatian Spirituality
- Antonia Darder, Ph.D., professor of Education and Leavey Endowed Chair of Ethics and Moral Leadership
- Chris Donahue, lecturer, School of Film and Television (1997–2002), Academy Award-winning film producer
- Rev. William Fulco, S.J., Ph.D., professor of Classics and Archeology, National Endowment for the Humanities Professor of Ancient Mediterranean Studies
- Amir Hussain, Ph.D., professor of Theological Studies and editor of the Journal of the American Academy of Religion
- Helen Landgarten (1921-2011), psychotherapist, art therapy pioneer; the Helen B. Landgarten Art Therapy Clinic at Loyola Marymount University was founded in 2007
- Rubén Martínez, professor of English and Fletcher Jones Chair in Literature & Writing at Loyola Marymount University
- Rev. Thomas P. Rausch, S.J., Ph.D., professor of Theological Studies, T. Marie Chilton Professor of Catholic Theology
- Chuck Rosenthal, Ph.D., professor of English
- Paul Salamunovich, Ph.D (honoris causa), professor of Music, conductor of the Los Angeles Master Chorale 1991–2001, Grammy nominee, recipient of the Pro-Eclesia et Pontifice and a Knight Commander in the Order of St. Gregory, inaugural inductee of Loyola Marymount University Faculty Hall of Fame
- Daniel L. Smith-Christopher, D.Phil., professor of Theological Studies—Old Testament, chair of the Peace Studies Program
- Wole Soyinka, Nobel laureate, President's Marymount Professor
- Hector Tobar, adjunct professor of Literature
- Paul Tiyambe Zeleza, Ph.D., dean of the Bellarmine College of Liberal Arts; President's Professor of African-American Studies and History
