= Jo Willems =

Belgian cinematographer

- Born: November 1970; Belgium
- Education: LUCA School of Arts
- Years active: 1998–present
- Spouse: Karen O'Brien (m. 2000)

Jo Willems is a Belgian cinematographer, known for his collaboration with directors David Slade and Francis Lawrence.

== Early life ==
Growing up in Westerlo outside Antwerp, he studied film at the LUCA School of Arts, before he relocated to the United Kingdom at the age of 21.

== Filmography ==
=== Feature film ===
Year	Title	Director
2005	Hard Candy	David Slade
2005	London	Hunter Richards
2007	Rocket Science	Jeffrey Blitz
2007	30 Days of Night	David Slade
2009	Confessions of a Shopaholic	P. J. Hogan
2011	Limitless	Neil Burger
2013	The Hunger Games: Catching Fire	Francis Lawrence
2014	The Hunger Games: Mockingjay – Part 1	Francis Lawrence
2015	The Hunger Games: Mockingjay – Part 2	Francis Lawrence
2018	Red Sparrow	Francis Lawrence
2020	His House	Remi Weekes
2021	Finch	Miguel Sapochnik
2022	Slumberland	Francis Lawrence
2023	The Hunger Games: The Ballad of Songbirds & Snakes	Francis Lawrence
2025	The Long Walk	Francis Lawrence
2025	The Hand That Rocks the Cradle	Michelle Garza Cervera
2026	The Hunger Games: Sunrise on the Reaping	Francis Lawrence

=== Television ===
Year	Title	Director	Notes
2012	Gotham	Francis Lawrence	TV movie
2012	Touch	Francis Lawrence	Episode: "Pilot"
2012	Awake	David Slade	Episode: "Pilot"
2017	American Gods	David Slade	3 episodes
2019	See	Francis Lawrence	3 episodes
2025	Black Mirror	David Slade	Episode: "Plaything"

== Awards and nominations ==
Year	Award	Category	Title	Result
2007	Fancine	Best Cinematography	Hard Candy	Won
2020	British Independent Film Awards	Best Cinematography	His House	Nominated
