= Francis Lawrence videography =

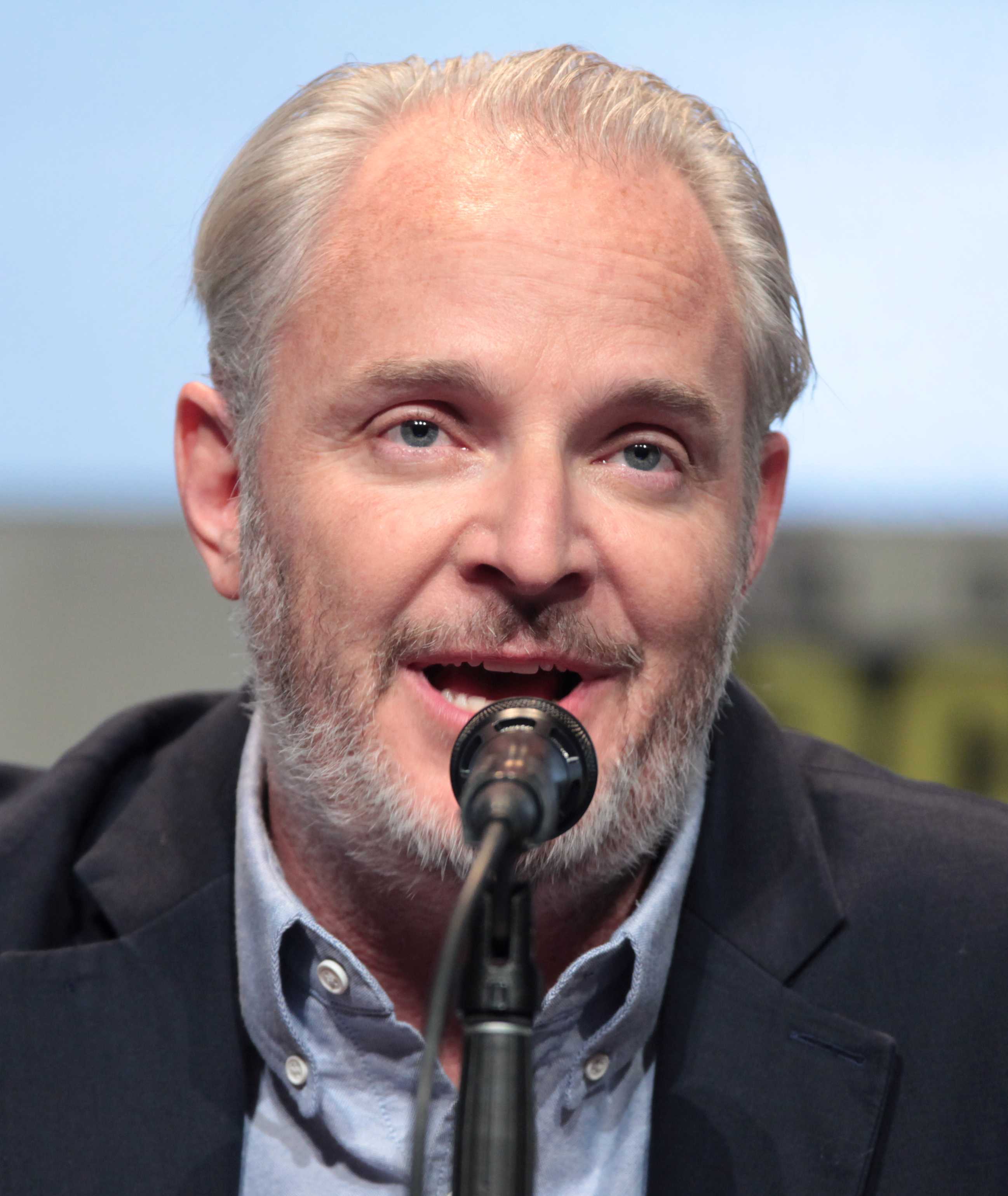
Lawrence in 2015

This is a list of the works that American director and producer Francis Lawrence has been involved with.

== Film ==
Year	Title	Director	Producer
2005	Constantine	Yes	No
2007	I Am Legend	Yes	No
2010	Jonah Hex	Reshoots	No
2011	Water for Elephants	Yes	No
2013	The Hunger Games: Catching Fire	Yes	No
2014	The Hunger Games: Mockingjay – Part 1	Yes	No
2015	The Hunger Games: Mockingjay – Part 2	Yes	No
2018	Red Sparrow	Yes	No
2022	Slumberland	Yes	Yes
2023	The Hunger Games: The Ballad of Songbirds & Snakes	Yes	Yes
2025	The Long Walk	Yes	Yes
2026	The Hunger Games: Sunrise on the Reaping	Yes	Yes

Assistant director

- Pump Up the Volume (1990)
- Marching Out of Time (1993)

== Television ==
Year	Title	Director	Executive Producer	Notes
2009	Kings	Yes	Yes	Directed episodes "Pilot: Goliath: Part 1", "Prosperity" and "First Night"
2012	Gotham	Yes	No	TV movie
2012–13	Touch	Yes	Yes	Directed episode "Pilot"
2019–2022	See	Yes	Yes	Directed episodes "Godflame", "Message in a Bottle" and "Fresh Blood"
2022–2024	The Serpent Queen	No	Yes	
2025	Chief of War	No	Yes	

== Music videos ==
Title	Year	Artist(s)	Notes	Ref(s)
"A Man Rides Through"	1993	Tidal Force		
"Touch Y'all"	1993	Omniscence		
"Go"	1994	A Western Front		
"The Problem"	1994	A Western Front		
"Safe in Your Arms"	1994	Alldaron West		
"This Time"	1994	Life of Agony		
"Come Widdit"	1995	Ahmad feat. Ras Kass & Saafir		
"All I Need to Know"	1995	Foreigner		
"Elevation (Free My Mind)"	1995	The BUMS		
"Shining Star"	1995	Boyz of Paradize		
"Operations of Nature"	1995	Akon		
"They Don't Want None"	1996	Royal C		
"Superman"	1996	Unwritten Law		
"Sexual Capacity"	1996	Color Me Badd		
"Set It Off"	1996	Organized Noize feat. Queen Latifah		
"Lady"	1996	Mista		
"I Got It Bad"	1996	Tevin Campbell		
"One More Chance"	1996	Art Porter feat. Lalah Hathaway		
"Only Love"	1996	The Braxtons		
"10 in 2010"	1997	Bad Religion		
"For You I Will"	1997	Monica		
"Let It Go"	1997	Ray J		
"Femininity"	1997	Eric Benét		
"So Amazing"	1997	Total Commitment		
"A Little Bit of Ecstasy"	1997	Jocelyn Enriquez		
"Losing a Whole Year"	1997	Third Eye Blind		
"Mann's Chinese"	1997	Naked		
"Everything You Want"	1997	Ray J		
"C U When U Get There"	1997	Coolio feat. 40 Thevz		
"Things Just Ain't the Same"	1997	Deborah Cox		
"(Freak) And U Know It"	1997	Adina Howard		
"A Smile Like Yours"	1997	Natalie Cole		
"Happiness"	1997	Vanessa L. Williams		
"Too Gone, Too Long"	1997	En Vogue		
"My Body"	1997	LSG		
"Gone Till November"	1997	Wyclef Jean feat. Refugee Camp All-Stars	MTV Video Music Award for Best R&B Video; Nominated — MTV Video Music Award for Best Direction	
"Love Me"	1998	112 feat. Mase		
"Adia"	1998	Sarah McLachlan		
"Do You Really Want Me (Show Respect)"	1998	Robyn		
"Ghetto Supastar (That Is What You Are)"	1998	Pras Michel feat. Ol' Dirty Bastard & Mýa	Nominated — MTV Video Music Award for Best Rap Video; Nominated — MTV Video Music Award for Best Video from a Film	
"I Don't Want to Miss a Thing"	1998	Aerosmith	MTV Video Music Award for Best Video from a Film	
"Fire Escape"	1998	Fastball		
"Here We Come"	1998	Timbaland feat. Magoo & Missy Elliott		
"Human Beings"	1998	Seal		
"What's So Different?"	1999	Ginuwine		
"Fortunate"	1999	Maxwell		
"Lost My Faith"	1999	Seal		
"Girl's Best Friend"	1999	Jay-Z		
"It's All About You (Not About Me)"	1999	Tracie Spencer		
"Back at One"	1999	Brian McKnight	Nominated — MTV Video Music Award for Best R&B Video; Nominated — Grammy Award for Best Short Form Music Video	
"Waiting for Tonight/Una Noche Mas"	1999	Jennifer Lopez	MTV Video Music Award for Best Dance Video	
"Rhythm Divine"	1999	Enrique Iglesias		
"Turn Your Lights Down Low"	1999	Lauryn Hill feat. Bob Marley		
"Never Be the Same Again"	2000	Melanie C featuring Lisa Left-Eye Lopes		
"Private Emotion"	2000	Ricky Martin		
"10 Days Late"	2000	Third Eye Blind		
"Could I Have This Kiss Forever"	2000	Whitney Houston featuring Enrique Iglesias		
"Independent Women Part I"	2000	Destiny's Child	Nominated — MTV Video Music Award for Best Video from a Film	
"I'm Like a Bird"	2000	Nelly Furtado		
"How Many Licks?"	2000	Lil' Kim		
"The Call (Neptunes Remix)"	2001	Backstreet Boys		
"Warning"	2001	Green Day		
"The Call"	2001	Backstreet Boys	Nominated — MTV Video Music Award for Best Pop Video	
"Jaded"	2001	Aerosmith	Nominated — MTV Video Music Award for Best Rock Video	
"Play"	2001	Jennifer Lopez		
"Someone to Call My Lover"	2001	Janet Jackson		
"Someone to Call My Lover (So So Def Remix)"	2001	Janet Jackson feat. Jermaine Dupri		
"Alive"	2001	P.O.D.	Nominated — MTV Video Music Award for Video of the Year; Nominated — MTV Video Music Award for Best Group Video; Nominated — MTV Video Music Award for Best Direction	
"Sunny Hours"	2001	Long Beach Dub Allstars feat. will.i.am		
"Emotion"	2001	Destiny's Child		
"I'm a Slave 4 U"	2001	Britney Spears	Nominated — MTV Video Music Award for Best Female Video; Nominated — MTV Video Music Award for Best Dance Video	
"Just Because"	2001	Ginuwine		
"Whenever, Wherever/Suerte"	2001	Shakira	Latin Grammy Award for Best Short Form Music Video; Nominated — MTV Video Music Award for Best Female Video; Nominated — MTV Video Music Award for Best Pop Video; Nominated — MTV Video Music Award for Best Dance Video	
"Son of a Gun (I Betcha Think This Song Is About You)"	2001	Janet Jackson feat. Missy Elliott & Carly Simon		
"Breaking Up the Girl"	2002	Garbage		
"Hands Clean"	2002	Alanis Morissette		
"Wrong Impression"	2002	Natalie Imbruglia		
"Here Is Gone"	2002	Goo Goo Dolls		
"Warning"	2002	Incubus		
"Precious Illusions"	2002	Alanis Morissette		
"Black Suits Comin' (Nod Ya Head)"	2002	Will Smith	Nominated — MTV Video Music Award for Best Video from a Film	
"Just like a Pill"	2002	Pink		
"Nod Ya Head (Remix)"	2002	Will Smith feat. Christina Vidal & Tra-Knox		
"Goodbye To You"	2002	Michelle Branch		
"Get Over It"	2002	OK Go		
"Sk8er Boi"	2002	Avril Lavigne	Nominated — MTV Video Music Award for Best Pop Video	
"Jenny from the Block"	2002	Jennifer Lopez		
"Cry Me a River"	2002	Justin Timberlake	MTV Video Music Award for Best Male Video; MTV Video Music Award for Best Pop Video; Nominated — MTV Video Music Award for Video of the Year; Nominated — MTV Video Music Award for Best Direction	
"Volvo Driving Soccer Mom"	2003	Everclear		
"Lights Out"	2003	Lisa Marie Presley		
"Rock Your Body"	2003	Justin Timberlake	MTV Video Music Award for Best Dance Video	
"Let's Get It Started"	2004	The Black Eyed Peas		
"All Nite (Don't Stop)"	2004	Janet Jackson		
"What You Waiting For?"	2004	Gwen Stefani	Nominated — MTV Europe Music Award for Best Video	
"Get Right"	2005	Jennifer Lopez	Nominated — MTV Video Music Award for Best Dance Video; Nominated — MTV Video Music Award for Best Direction	
"Be Yourself"	2005	Audioslave		
"Speak"	2005	Lindsay Lohan	Unreleased/Cancelled in post-production	
"Every Day Is Exactly the Same"	2006	Nine Inch Nails	Unreleased/Cancelled in post-production	
"Pump It"	2006	The Black Eyed Peas		
"Buttons"	2006	The Pussycat Dolls featuring Snoop Dogg	MTV Video Music Award for Best Dance Video	
"Baby Love"	2007	Nicole Scherzinger featuring will.i.am		
"Circus"	2008	Britney Spears	Nominated — MTV Video Music Award for Best Direction; Nominated — MTV Europe Music Award for Best Video	
"Bad Romance"	2009	Lady Gaga	Grammy Award for Best Short Form Music Video; MTV Video Music Award for Best Direction; MTV Video Music Award for Best Female Video; MTV Video Music Award for Best Pop Video; MTV Video Music Award for Best Dance Video; MTV Video Music Awards – Video of the Year	
"Run the World (Girls)"	2011	Beyoncé	Nominated — MTV Europe Music Award for Best Video	

== See also ==
- Francis Lawrence's unrealized projects
