= Jim Boeven =

German actor

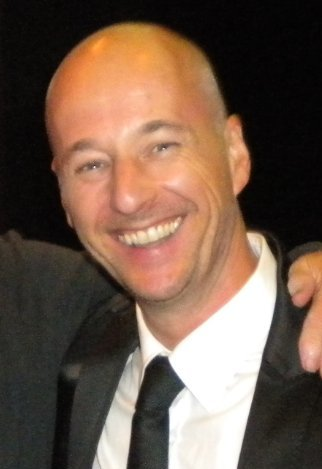
- Boeven in 2013
- Born: 11 November 1967 (age 58); Menden, Märkischer Kreis, North Rhine-Westphalia, Germany
- Occupation: Actor
- Years active: 1992–present
- Website: jimboeven.com

Jim Boeven (born 11 November 1967) is a German born film, television and voice actor. After establishing himself as a star in his native Germany, he moved to Los Angeles in 2007.

== Early life ==
Boeven was born in Menden, Germany. He studied acting from 1991 to 1993 at UCLA and the Actors Center in Los Angeles, and then at the Hollywood Acting Workshop in Cologne.

== Career ==
He began his career in Cologne and quickly became a series regular in the series Alle lieben Julia, Jede Menge Leben, and Jets – Leben am Limit. He has had a prolific European TV career, appearing in 450 episodes that have aired in 24 countries as either a lead/star recurring and/or guest star.

He appeared in his first American feature, Marching Out of Time, in 1993. Since then, he's appeared in a multitude of feature films and TV, both in Hollywood and internationally. He appeared in the Colin Farrell and Bruce Willis film Hart's War (2002), and in the Bollywood production Colours of Passion (2008), directed by Ketan Mehta. He was cast by Paul Schrader and Bret Easton Ellis for their film The Canyons (2013), and was a guest star in the Jerry Bruckheimer-produced TV series CSI: Cyber (2015) and the Golden Globe nominated comedy Jane the Virgin (2015).

Boeven began his voiceover career in 1996 and has more than 350 credits, most recently for the international releases of the Brad Pitt film Fury (2014), the Tom Hanks film Bridge of Spies (2015), and Captain America: Civil War (2016). He is also known for providing the voice of König in Call of Duty: Modern Warfare II (2022) and Call of Duty: Modern Warfare III (2023).

== Filmography ==
Film
Year	Title	Role	Notes
1992	Schtonk!	(uncredited)	
1993	Marching Out of Time	Major Fürst	
2002	Hart's War	MP Sergeant	
2002	Flashback	Rolf Müller	short film
2005	Mein ganz gewöhnliches Leben	Herr Müller	
2005	De Profundis	Marshal	short film
2006	One Way	Anthony's friend	
2007	The Cell	Schneider	
2008	Rang Rasiya (Colours of Passion)	Fritz Schleizer	
2010	Airline Disaster	Snake	
2010	David and Goliath	Private Schneider	short film
2011	Freerunner	German Businessman	
2011	Das Leben ist keine Autobahn	German Director	
2013	The Canyons	Jon	
2015	Sun Choke	Janie's Dad	

Television
Year	Title	Role	Notes
1992	Sexual Response	Street Guy	TV movie
1994	Alle lieben Julia	Andy	series regular - 26 episodes
1994-95	Unter uns	Dirk Jakubeit	8 episodes
1995	Notaufnahme	Ole	episode: "Nobody is Perfect"
1995	Jede Menge Leben	Patrick Schmole	series regular - 361 episodes
1996	T.V. Kaiser	Pascal Wennemann	episode: "Frauenhandel"
1996	Auf Achse	Bernd	episode: "Überraschung in Rotterdam"
1997-2003	Alphateam – Die Lebensretter im OP	Lutz Mönke/AndreWaltermann	2 episodes
1998	Der Kuß des Killers	Uwe	TV movie
1998-1999	Der Fahnder	Ledermann	6 episodes
1999-2001	JETS – Leben am Limit	Frank Jäger	series regular - 13 episodes
1999-2002	Großstadtrevier	Klaus Krüger	2 episodes
2000	Die Rote Meile	Robert Scharrer	episode: "Ein unmoralisches Angebot"
2001	The Wandering Soul Murders	Kurt Wolf	TV movie
2001-2012	Lindenstraße	Beck/Chris	8 episodes
2002	Torso: The Evelyn Dick Story	John Dick	TV movie
2003	Bei aller Liebe	Kai	2 episodes
2003	Verbotene Liebe	Waffenhändler Ole Strauß	2 episodes
2003	Zwei Profis	Tom Schwering	episode: "...und das tote Mädchen"
2005	Dem Himmel sei Dank	Dr. Kläuber	TV movie
2005	Prinz und Paparazzi	Mr. Security	TV movie
2006	Pastewka	Sascha Albrecht	episode: "Der Einzug"
2006	Das Glück klopft an die Tür	Makler Roland Herzog	TV movie
2006	Die Familienanwältin	Polizist	episode: "Hinter dem Spiegel"
2007	Crash Kids: Trust No One	Dr. Schmidt	TV movie
2007	Alarm für Cobra 11 - Die Autobahnpolizei	Frank Nießen	episode: "Der Staatsanwalt"
2007	Der Staatsanwalt	Bartender	episode: "Glückskinder"
2012	La La Land	Jimbo	series regular
2015	Jane the Virgin	Henchman	4 episodes
2015	CSI: Cyber	German Bidder	episode: "Kidnapping 2.0"
2016	Katie Fforde: Die Frau an seiner Seite	Ted Sweeney	TV movie
