= Rochelle Hoi-Yiu Kwan =

Rochelle Hoi-Yiu Kwan (born c. 1994), is a second-generation Hong Kong American DJ (known professionally as YiuYiu (瑶瑶)), oral history educator, and cultural organizer based in New York City. She is the founder of Chinatown Records and was awarded the 2023 Manhattan Arts Grant from the New York City Department of Cultural Affairs to honor outstanding artists and cultural organizers in NYC.

== Early life ==
Kwan was born around 1994 and raised in the San Francisco Bay Area. Her parents immigrated to the United States from Hong Kong in the 70s and 80s.

== Education ==
In 2015, Kwan graduated from Loyola Marymount University in Los Angeles, California, where she studied Women's Studies, Sociology, and Psychology.

== Career ==
Kwan became the Storytelling Team Lead for the nonprofit Think!Chinatown, where she combines oral history, song, and storytelling to create workshops for community members focused on exploring the Asian diaspora. She has led workshops such as “An Ode to Our Generations: Remembering the Music and Memories of Yellow Pearl and Basement Workshop,” which was showcased at Chinatown Arts Week 2021 and on T!C Collections–DCTV Firehouse Cinema.

Kwan also founded and runs a project called Chinatown Records, which focuses on the history of Cantopop, Chinese opera, and Taiwanese pop. She attributed her inspiration for starting Chinatown Records Project to her father, who used to host Cantonese karaoke parties featuring old traditional music. The record shop currently is home to a number of records, each exploring a different family and their personal connection to the song.

On March 13, 2023, Kwan received the 2023 Manhattan Arts Grant from the New York City Department of Cultural Affairs to honor outstanding artists and cultural organizations in NYC. She hosted an oral history workshop called "The Stories All Around Us: Oral Histories as Collaborative Art- and History-Making with Our Loved Ones" through the Oral History Association and sponsored by a grant from the National Endowment for the Humanities American Rescue Plan.
