= Jede Menge Leben =

- Country of origin: Germany

Jede Menge Leben is a German television series.

== See also ==
- List of German television series
