= Anton Vassil =

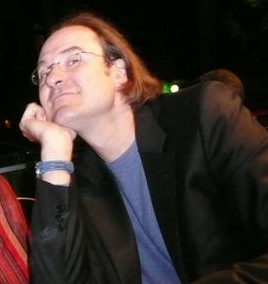
Vassil

Anton Vassil is a screenwriter/film director who worked on various feature films, music videos, commercials and documentaries. With a master's degree from Loyola Marymount University film school, Vassil directed his first feature Marching Out of Time and went on to direct a series of films and documentaries including Guderian, La Dictature de la Pensée Unique and Les Oiseaux. In 2008, he developed ISS Space Agency, a European thriller. In 2015 he directs Laurent et Safi, a French musical feature, released theatrically in France and Africa in 2017. In 2018 he directs 'Le Gendarme de Abobo' scheduled for a 2019 theatrical release.

== Early career ==
Born in Düsseldorf, Germany, Vassil is a French citizen who spent 15 years in America and Canada. Vassil attended Institut Monana in Switzerland. As a director fluent in French, English and German, he is often associated with international projects requiring multilingual skills and international co-productions.

== Later ==
In 2015, he directs Laurent et Safi starring Michel Gohou, Guimba, Teeyah, Tatiana Rojo, Xavier Jozelon, Fantani Touré, Nico Rogner and Innocent Versace.

In 2018 he directs Le Gendarme de Abobo starring Michel Michel Gohou, Le Magnific, Agalawal, Ray Reboul, Bienvenue Obro.

== Sources ==
- Anton Vassil at IMDb
- Anton Vassil's Biography
- B-MOL PRODUCTIONS
