= Pilot (Touch) =

- Touch episode
- Episode no.: Season 1 Episode 1
- Directed by: Francis Lawrence
- Written by: Tim Kring
- Production code: 1ATG79
- Original air date: January 25, 2012
- Running time: 50 minutes^{[a]}

Guest appearances
- Danny Glover as Arthur Teller; Titus Welliver as Randall Meade

Episode chronology
← Previous —	Next → "1+1=3"

"Pilot" (also known as "Tales of the Red Thread") is the first episode of the first season of the American supernatural thriller drama television series Touch. The episode premiered in the United States on Fox on January 25, 2012. The episode was written by series creator Tim Kring and directed by Francis Lawrence. The concept of Touch was devised by Kring, who developed the science fiction drama Heroes for the NBC network.

In this episode, Martin Bohm (Kiefer Sutherland), a widower father, tries to communicate with and control his mute and emotionally challenged son Jake Bohm (David Mazouz), an autistic child that enjoys writing sequences of repeating numbers in a notebook. Martin must also contend with Clea Hopkins (Gugu Mbatha-Raw), a social worker from Child and Family Services sent to investigate Jake and his family situation. Everything changes when Martin discovers that Jake possesses the gift of staggering genius, while visiting researcher Arthur Teller (Danny Glover). Meanwhile, other various character subplots, scattered about the world, are unknowingly interconnected through a series of numbers and actions recognized by Jake.

The episode debuted as a special preview to its official scheduled regularly aired time slot on March 22, 2012, with episodes recurring weekly. The preview brought in the second-biggest audience of any prime-time drama premiere during that season at 12.01 million viewers and a positive 3.9 in the 18-49 demographic.

== Plot ==
For the third time in three weeks, Jake Bohm (David Mazouz) has run away from school and climbed atop a cell phone tower, breaking the tower's security alarms at precisely 3:18 in the afternoon each time. For Child and Family Services, they, who have previously diagnosed Jake as autistic, see Jake's behavior as Martin Bohm (Kiefer Sutherland) not being able to handle Jake on his own, send Clea Hopkins (Gugu Mbatha-Raw) to investigate. To perform a proper assessment, she removes Jake from the home and places him in an institution for two weeks where she can monitor him. Martin not only finds that move contemptible, but also believes that Jake is trying to tell him something, especially as the numbers Jake is scribbling seem to pop up elsewhere in their lives, as Jake makes stray cell phones that Martin has found for him ring simultaneously, and after a lottery ticket Jake temporarily steals ends up being the multimillion-dollar jackpot winning numbers.

In his search to find out if Jake is just mute or if he has some other condition affecting his behavior, Martin finds Arthur DeWitt (Danny Glover) of the Teller Institute, who tells Martin his theory of Jake's condition. Clea begins to believe that their autism diagnosis is incorrect when she views Jake first hand. Meanwhile, one of those cell phones which almost made it into Jake's possession makes a 'round the world trip from London to Ireland, to John F. Kennedy airport, to Japan, and to Baghdad where it ends up making it full circle from its original owner, a distraught father, to a wannabe pop singer, then to a teen who wants to help his family by buying a commercial oven for their baking business.

== Production ==
=== Development ===
Screenwriter/producer Tim Kring developed and wrote the script for the "Pilot" episode of Touch, and was directed by Francis Lawrence. According to Kring the show is based on the idea of inter-connectivity and global consciousness that utilizes narrative and big archetypal stories to display positive messages throughout the world. Also, incorporating stories on a smaller more personal level. Kring concentrated on the central idea of the father-son relationship between the characters of Martin and Jake Bohm, emphasizing the father's role as being the eyes and ears, blindly following the "bread crumb" trail that Jake dispenses. Surrounding the central idea would be "satellite" stories that develop a sense of the small world feeling and emphasize inter-connectivity throughout the globe.

Touch is another ambitious series from Tim Kring that is beautifully
executed and has incredibly resonant themes for our times.

— Fox Entertainment president Kevin Reilly.

On September 22, 2011, Kevin Reilly, President of Entertainment for Fox Broadcasting Company, announced the ordering of 13 episodes of Touch, under the production of Chernin Entertainment and Tailwind Productions, in association with 20th Century Fox Television.

Filming began on June 20, 2011, in Los Angeles, California for the "Pilot" episode. The show premiered on January 25, 2012 at 9 p.m. Eastern Standard time on Fox.

=== Casting ===
In a MIPCOM interview between Touch creator Tim Kring, Fox executive Kevin Reilly, and actor Kiefer Sutherland, in October 2011, Kring said that Sutherland wasn't in mind for the character of Martin Bohm when he originally wrote the script. Sutherland when approached to do the show was two years detached from his iconic role of Jack Bauer on the international hit television show 24. In the same interview Sutherland, who was acting on the Broadway show That Championship Season admits that when he was approached by Reilly and executive producer Peter Chernin, he told them "I’m not anticipating going back to work at this time, so I don’t wanna waste your time." After Chernin and Reilly insisted that Sutherland read the script, Sutherland said that 25 pages in he knew he wanted to do the show. On February 22, 2011, Sutherland closed a deal to star in the new Fox pilot Touch.

Tim Kring, in an interview, shared that finding the right actor to play Jake Bohm wasn't easy. Kiefer Sutherland, who played a role in the process of finding his main counterpart, said that between himself and David Mazouz, who was the first of about a two dozen kids to audition, was a natural connection. Mouzouz, who held small credentials with appearances on various television shows and a role on Lifetime's Amish Grace, obtained the role of Jake in June 2011.

== Reception ==
=== Ratings ===
The episode "Pilot" of the television series Touch that aired at 9:00 EST on Fox received 3.9/10 in the Nielsen ratings among people aged 18–49, and accumulated a total of 12.01 million viewers. The episode was the 4th most watched prime time television show for January 25, 2011, behind American Idol, CSI: Crime Scene Investigation and Criminal Minds, and the second most watched in its time slot. The episode ranked second in the 18-49 demographic for the day and fifth for the week. "Pilot" is the most viewed episode of the first season of Touch and to date is the most viewed episode of the series.

=== Reviews ===
The pilot episode of the series was met with mostly positive reviews from critics. David Hiltbrand of The Philadelphia Inquirer deemed the show as "rather intriguing and well-executed" and Verne Gay of Newsday wrote "Touch is still one of the best pilots of the 2011-12 season to date." Chicago Sun-Times writer Lori Rackl said "The first episode delivers a suspenseful ride around the world, peppered with some tear-jerking moments" and continues by writing "The bar has been set high."

Other reviewers were on the fence of the shows ability to sustain itself, as Pittsburgh Post-Gazette writer Rob Owen points out "Touch feels like yet another series--that seemed like a better idea for a one-shot movie than a weekly TV series", and Entertainment Weekly's James Poniewozik reports "It still remains to be seen what it looks like as a series; with some stronger writing and deeper character work, it could build on its math-superpower idea to make something intriguing and emotional."

== Notes ==
- ^{a} : The running time for the special preview of the show was extended an extra seven minutes instead of the regular approximate 44 minutes.
