= Touch (American TV series) =

American television series

- Genre: Drama; Thriller
- Created by: Tim Kring
- Starring: Kiefer Sutherland; Gugu Mbatha-Raw; David Mazouz; Danny Glover; Lukas Haas; Saïd Taghmaoui; Saxon Sharbino; Maria Bello
- Composers: Wendy Melvoin; Lisa Coleman
- Country of origin: United States
- Original language: English
- No. of seasons: 2
- No. of episodes: 26

Production
- Executive producers: Carol Barbee; Suzan Bymel; Peter Chernin; Tim Kring; Francis Lawrence; Kiefer Sutherland
- Producers: Dennis Hammer; Brynn Malone; Robert Levine
- Cinematography: Curtis Wehr; Jeffrey C. Mygatt; Tom Yatsko; Jo Willems
- Editors: Scott Powell; Lauren A. Schaffer; Gregory T. Evans; Louis Cioffi; Howard Leder; Dody Dorn; Elisa Cohen
- Running time: 44–49 minutes
- Production companies: Tailwind Productions; Chernin Entertainment; 20th Century Fox Television

Original release
- Network: Fox
- Release: January 25, 2012 – May 10, 2013

Touch is an American drama television series that ran on Fox from January 25, 2012, to May 10, 2013. The series was created by Tim Kring and starred Kiefer Sutherland. During its first season the series aired regularly on Thursday nights beginning March 22, 2012. Thirteen episodes were ordered for the first season, with the two-episode season finale airing on Thursday, May 31, 2012. On May 9, 2012, Fox renewed the show for a second season. The second season was originally scheduled to begin Friday, October 26, 2012, but was pushed back to Friday, February 8, 2013. On May 9, 2013, Fox canceled the series after two seasons.

== Plot ==
Touch centers on former reporter Martin Bohm (Kiefer Sutherland) and his 11-year-old son, Jake (David Mazouz), who has been diagnosed as autistic. Martin's wife died in the World Trade Center during the September 11 attacks, and he has been struggling to raise Jake since then, moving from job to job while tending to Jake's special needs. Jake has never spoken a word, but is fascinated by numbers and patterns relating to numbers, spending much of his days writing them down in notebooks or his touch-screen tablet and sometimes using objects (for instance popcorn kernels).

=== Season 1 ===
Jake's repeated escapes from special schools put Martin's capacity to raise the child in question, and social worker Clea Hopkins (Gugu Mbatha-Raw) arrives to perform an evaluation of Jake's living conditions. Martin, worried that he might lose his son, attempts to communicate with him, but the boy only continues to write down a specific pattern of numbers. This leads Martin to discover Professor Arthur Teller (Danny Glover), who has seen and worked with cases like this before, claiming that Jake is one of the few who can see the "pain of the universe" through the numbers. Teller also alludes to the interconnectivity of humanity as envisioned by the Chinese legend of the red string of fate, whereby actions, seen and unseen, can change the fate of people across the globe for the better. Martin realizes that Jake is trying to tell him to follow the numbers. On subsequent days, Martin does as Jake wants, each time finding his actions improving those touched by the numbers, though his devotion to following Jake's message puts his evaluation with social services at risk.

A larger overarching plot involves Teller's work. Teller himself had seen the numbers during a stroke and has been fascinated with them since. The sequence of numbers that Jake presents falls into what Teller claimed was the Amelia Sequence (later known as the God Sequence), based on Amelia Robbins, who was one of his former child patients. Teller later is found dead after attempting to locate Amelia at the same facility where Jake spends his days. Martin discovers Teller's old office, rented out from a Jewish synagogue, where he had been performing further research on the Amelia Sequence. He also learns that Teller's office mate, Avram (Bodhi Elfman), recognizes Jake as one of the 36 Righteous Ones. Meanwhile, Clea learns that an organization called Aster Corps, which provides Jake's school with modern equipment, seems intent on studying Jake's abilities as well as having ties to Teller's previous work with Amelia. When Aster Corps attempts to force the state to relinquish Martin's custody rights, Martin, with Clea's help, is able to sneak Jake out and leave the city. Through Jake's directions, they end up meeting Amelia's mother, Lucy (Maria Bello), on the Santa Monica Pier.

=== Season 2 ===
Martin, Jake, and Lucy gain help in their quest from news syndicate BreakWire and its owner, Trevor Wilcox (Greg Ellis). Jake starts to talk to Amelia (Saxon Sharbino) in their telepathic world. They also encounter Calvin Norburg (Lukas Haas), a former Aster Corps genius who is trying to heal his brain-damaged brother, and a murderous former priest, Guillermo Ortiz (Saïd Taghmaoui), who is determined to eliminate all of the Righteous 36 in order to restore the natural order of the universe, with God on top. After Lucy is killed on the orders of Aster Corps CEO Nicole Farington (Frances Fisher), Martin discovers that Farington plans to capture Jake and Amelia in order to decipher the God Sequence and use its predictive qualities to save the failing company.

The season ends with Amelia (Saxon Sharbino) losing her special powers and Jake being secretly marked as the special one of the 36 by the rabbi. Calvin loses his sick brother after all his efforts, and Martin becomes the sole protector of the 36. The God Sequence is finally fully revealed.

== Cast and characters ==
=== Main ===
- Kiefer Sutherland as Martin Bohm: a former journalist turned baggage handler, whose wife died in the September 11 attacks.
- David Mazouz as Jacob "Jake" Bohm: Martin's mute 11-year-old son, who is obsessed with numbers and can see past, present and future events through numbers, and shows his father the numbers so that his father can help stop bad events from happening
- Gugu Mbatha-Raw as Clea Hopkins (season 1): a social worker who is sent to do an evaluation of the Bohms' living situation, and helps Martin and Jake escape from New York.
- Danny Glover as Professor Arthur Teller (season 1): an expert on the gifted few who possess numerical clairvoyance.
- Maria Bello (season 2; guest, season 1) as Lucy Robbins: the mother of Amelia, a girl who shares a gift similar to that of Jake and former client of Teller.
- Saxon Sharbino as Amelia Robbins (season 2): Lucy's missing daughter, who is gifted like Jake.
- Lukas Haas as Calvin Norburg (season 2): an Aster Corps genius whose path crosses with Martin and Jake. He is researching Amelia's brain activity, and plans to use the data to help his brain-damaged brother, William, recover from a major accident that he caused.
- Saïd Taghmaoui as Guillermo Ortiz (season 2): a priest-turned-murderer bent on killing the 36 people with Jake's ability, though he is one himself. When finally cornered by Martin, he kills himself rather than be captured, but not before apologizing to God (within earshot of Martin) for not finding the "nest of seven."

=== Recurring cast ===
- Bodhi Elfman as Avram Hadar: a Hasidic Jew who shares an office with Teller. A student of Kabbalah, Avram believes Jake's special abilities are tied to this mysticism.
- Frances Fisher as Nicole Farington: CEO of Aster Corps who tries to decipher the God Sequence in order to predict the future to the advantage of Aster Corps.
- Mykelti Williamson as Detective Lange: an LAPD detective who believes Martin's story enough to investigate Aster Corps.
- Adam Campbell as Anthony "Tony" Rigby: an Aster Corps executive who reports to Farington and is complicit in keeping Amelia away from her mother.
- Leland Orser as Dr. Linus: an Aster Corps employee in charge of the dangerous experiments being conducted on select members of the 36 at Aster Corps' Sleep Assessment Center. The experiments are disguised as treatment for sleep disorders, but are actually being used to complete the predictive number sequence for Aster Corps.
- D. B. Sweeney as Joseph Tanner: Aster Corps enforcer who works directly under Farington orders.
- Titus Welliver as Randall Meade: New York Lottery winner and a former firefighter who tried to rescue Martin's wife in the September 11 attacks. Meade believes he has a task to fulfill to atone for Sarah Bohm's death, which is driven by "his" numbers.
- Roxana Brusso as Sheri Strepling: the corrupt director of the board-and-care facility that Jake attended.
- Catherine Dent as Abigail Kelsey: Jake's aunt and an Aster Corps executive seeking custody of Jake.
- Linda Gehringer as Frances Norburg: Calvin's mother, a middle-school librarian who is called to be Amelia's handler after the girl is kidnapped. She is murdered under orders from Aster Corps.
- Samantha Whittaker as Dr. Nell Plimpton: an archaeologist and one of the 36 who comes to Los Angeles to Aster Corps' Sleep Assessment Center.
- May Miyata and Satomi Okuno as Miyoko and Izumi: Flamboyant Japanese friends whose online presence runs throughout the first season, beginning with a cellular telephone that they receive from an international journey.
- Greg Ellis (season 2) as Trevor Wilcox: Martin's former reporter rival and later a friend who now owns a news syndicate called BreakWire and becomes an ally. Martin often leaves Jake under his care.

== Production ==
Touch season one was shot at The Culver Studios in Culver City, California, and on location in Los Angeles. Season two was filmed at Fox Studios in Century City, Los Angeles.

=== Post-production ===
"Three Little Birds", sung by Kayla Graham (Karen David), was released as a soundtrack single, on iTunes by 20th Century Fox TV Records on February 28, 2012.

== Episodes ==
Season	Episodes	Originally released	
Season	Episodes	First released	Last released
1	13	January 25, 2012	September 14, 2012
2	13	February 8, 2013	May 10, 2013

=== Season 1 (2012) ===
No. overall	No. in season	Title	Directed by	Written by	Original release date	Prod. code	US viewers (millions)
1	1	"Tales of the Red Thread" "Pilot"	Francis Lawrence	Tim Kring	January 25, 2012	1ATG79	12.01
In the pilot episode, Martin Bohm (Kiefer Sutherland) is a single dad with a special needs son, Jake (David Mazouz). He soon is forced to have Jake institutionalized, and then works with a social worker named Clea (Gugu Mbatha-Raw) and a professor specializing in gifted humans named Arthur Teller (Danny Glover) to figure out what his mute son is trying to tell everyone through the use of numbers, specifically in this episode, the number 318.
2	2	"1+1=3"	Ian Toynton	Tim Kring	March 22, 2012	1ATG01	11.81
Clea continues to force Martin to return Jake to the board-and-care home, which he does despite his new-found communication with Jake. However, Jake gives his father the number 5296, which leads Martin to a pawn shop owner named Arnie (Jude Ciccolella). Moments later a robber comes in and shoots Arnie, and although Arnie survives he does not look pleased that he did. Jake escapes the institution to help Martin piece things together; at the same time a flight attendant (Amy Sloan) helps a young Indian man (Karan Soni) carry his father's ashes to the New York Stadium; a Russian boy realizes that the reason he may have no friends is because his father hurts people; Arnie attempts to commit suicide as he is suffering from terminal cancer and fears that he has no one to love him. In the end, the Russian boy's father was the employer of the robber of the pawn shop, who gives him a second chance in life. The flight attendant was Arnie's daughter, who arrives abruptly (chasing the Russian boy's dog who Martin accidentally let loose in the airport) and agrees to stand by him. The young Indian man finds an entrance to the stadium that the robber left open after he went back to settle his own issues, and spreads his father's ashes in the center of the field in hopes of finally making his father proud.
3	3	"Safety in Numbers"	Stephen Williams	Carol Barbee	March 29, 2012	1ATG02	8.92
Jake gives Martin the number "3287", which leads him to finding another person with the same skills as Jake (Rob Benedict). With the help of him and Jake, Martin exposes a corporate conspiracy. Meanwhile, a South African woman gathers her courage to support her little brother's wish to enter a worldwide dance competition, and protect her friend from an abusive man.
4	4	"Kite Strings"	Tucker Gates	Melinda Hsu Taylor	April 5, 2012	1ATG04	7.15
Lottery winner Randall returns to suggest that his winning numbers related to Sarah, Martin's wife and Jake's mother who was killed on 9/11. Jake offers Martin the next number, 9.5. This leads Martin to meet a man that his wife knew before she died on 9/11. Jake releases a kite into the air and they follow it into the city, leading it to the man's apartment. Martin surveys Sarah's datebook to see that she was to visit a jeweler on September 5. There, he finds a ring she was having engraved with "1+1=3"— her, Martin, and Jake.
5	5	"Entanglement"	Milan Cheylov	Chris Levinson	April 12, 2012	1ATG03	8.17
The number 22 figures in this episode as Jake's evaluation draws near, but mainly as a fractal pattern instead of just a number. The number leads Martin to a bus and a young woman named Mirasol seeking revenge on the man who murdered her family. Teller tries to reach out to Maggie, his daughter, who works as a nurse at Memorial Hospital. Meanwhile, a dishonest man tries to measure up to his daughter's wealthy stepfather, and two rebellious Middle Eastern girls take a road trip, and find a woman about to give birth.
6	6	"Lost and Found"	Stephen Williams	Robert Levine	April 19, 2012	1ATG05	7.32
Martin and Clea team up to learn more about her past and her mother. Will, a jazz-loving businessman, meets a woman and ends up with her seat on flight 975. He then survives a plane crash long enough to save Clea's mother's life. The woman he met realizes she narrowly escaped death and decides to have a baby. Teller visits Jake at a facility and learns that all the numbers are part of the "Amelia Sequence", but soon after that is found dead in his car. Meanwhile Jake adds a 6 to 975.
7	7	"Noosphere Rising"	Gwyneth Horder Payton	Tim Kring & Carol Barbee	April 26, 2012	1ATG06	6.43
Martin finds a key labeled 1188 that Teller left to Jake before he died. Natalie, a hopeless romantic who owns a video blog, tries to help Paolo, an Italian young man, to find a French girl he had briefly met, Celeste. Jake's aunt, Abigail, comes to the facility and tries to take custody over Jake. Martin follows the number on the key to a poker game, in which he must win in order to get information from another player.
8	8	"Zone of Exclusion"	Adam Kane	Chris Levinson	May 3, 2012	1ATG07	6.72
Jake gives Martin another pattern, this time a triangle in cat's cradle. With it and the number 1604, Martin must reunite a mother, father and twin sisters after they were separated by a corrupt obstetrician years ago. Meanwhile, an astronaut, named Allegra, desperately tries to regain comm with her fellow astronaut, Gio, who exited the International Space Station in order to fix a malfunction.
9	9	"Music of the Spheres"	Michael Waxman	Rob Fresco	May 10, 2012	1ATG08	6.84
At the facility, Jake makes a melody on a computer tablet using the numbers 55124. Martin takes Jake out for the day but discovers that Jake has picked up a gun from the city streets. Martin is frustrated with Jake until he realizes the gun is labeled with the same number, 55124. This number leads them to a 13-year-old troubled young man named Elliot, whose brother Andre is crippled and mute due to brain damage. Elliot must deal with a corrupted parole officer which causes Martin to intervene. Meanwhile, Felipe (Louis Ferreira), a Portuguese guitarist with dreams of living and playing music in New York, sells his guitar to share a life with Yarah (Linara Washington), a Brazilian woman. Martin and Clea meet Teller's best friend, Avram (Bodhi Elfman), and learn about Amelia, a girl like Jake, and the "36 righteous ones".
10	10	"Tessellations"	Jon Cassar	Zach Craley	May 17, 2012	1ATG10	6.02
When Martin is mistaken for a criminal, he must involve himself with a heist crew in order to win back an innocent dock worker's job, but more is at stake than he realizes. Meanwhile, an Israeli boy (Sean Peavy) and Palestinian girl (Eden Modiano) fight to keep their relationship afloat. Clea uncovers some surprising documents about Jake, while Martin and his late wife's sister, Abigail (Catherine Dent) meet to make a pivotal decision.
11	11	"Gyre (Part 1)"	Nelson McCormick	Story by : Jonathan I. Kidd & Sonya Winton; Teleplay by : Carol Barbee & Robert Levine	May 31, 2012	1ATG11	4.58
Martin and Abigail join forces as Aster Corp's interest in Jake increases; connections are revealed between events that seem unrelated. Martin finds proof that Amelia's death was faked, but he is attacked and robbed. Martin loses custody of Jake, apparently with Clea's cooperation.
12	12	"Gyre (Part 2)"	Greg Beeman	Tim Kring & Rob Fresco	May 31, 2012	1ATG12	4.60
On the day Jake is to be transferred to a distant facility, Clea arranges his escape. Martin and Jake leave the city with help from Avram and Randall and travel to California. The episode ends with Jake holding Martin's hand and meeting Amelia's mother Lucy (Maria Bello) on a beach.
13	13	"The Road Not Taken"	Nelson McCormick	Melinda Hsu Taylor	September 14, 2012	1ATG09	3.07
In the bonus episode, Martin's car mysteriously breaks down in the town where he got his start as a reporter. When he begins to suspect that his mentor is involved in illegal activities, he risks breaking up their friendship in order to search for the truth.

=== Season 2 (2013) ===
No. overall	No. in season	Title	Directed by	Written by	Original release date	Prod. code	US viewers (millions)
14	1	"Event Horizon"	Nelson McCormick	Tim Kring	February 8, 2013	2ATG01	3.94
Martin meets Amelia's mother Lucy (Maria Bello), who has been looking for her daughter for three years. Jake's numbers lead them to a motel with a mysterious man and, presumably, Amelia inside. Martin and Amelia's captor fight after she apparently escapes. The man is able to flee in a car, from which Martin writes the plate number. Martin asks his news syndicate contact Trevor Wilcox (Greg Ellis) to track down the car. Amelia's captor was a private detective hired by Aster Corps' lawyer Lawrence Pearl (John Prosky). At Aster, Martin briefly meets disgruntled employee Calvin Norburg (Lukas Haas). Calvin, believing he is close to discovering the god sequence, wishes to quit Aster as he knows the company will not use the sequence in a good way. Lawyer Pearl informs him that he will lose everything, work included, if he quits. Martin is able to access Pearl's computer to find Jake's recent numbers—5227, an address where they find the private detective and the runaway girl, who reveals that she is Pearl's illegitimate daughter. Jake finds a map in the girl's backpack that she claims another girl gave her on the beach. Trevor's hacker Reuben (Ray Santiago) informs Martin that Pearl's computer contained death certificates of people with their dates of death left blank, one of which was Jake's. At home, Calvin talks with the real Amelia, who asks him to let her go, while he claims her birth parents gave her up.
15	2	"Closer"	Michael Waxman	Carol Barbee	February 8, 2013	2ATG02	3.59
After seeing Calvin's breakdown online, Martin views him as a common Aster Corps enemy and wishes to speak with him. Knowing that reaching Calvin will be difficult, Martin turns his attention to Vikash Nayar (Dileep Rao), a man interested in Calvin as an employee. Martin learns Vikash's father has been kidnapped and ultimately saves Vikash at botched ransom drop. The drop was supposed to be a way for Vikash to be killed, due to his involvement with Calvin and taking his money from Aster Corps. Vikash and his father are reunited when Jake secretly places Martin's phone onto Vikash's person. Martin and Lucy track it to where the men are to be executed. He informs the captors the police are on the way, and they let the two men go. Meanwhile, Jake meets a girl named Soleil (Isabella Acres) at an amusement park and rides a ride with her, since her mother gets sick on them. He later ends up at Soleil's school where he meets her grandfather Carl (Randy Oglesby), who has been seen as the boyfriend of Frances (Linda Gehringer). Elsewhere, religious zealot Guillermo Ortiz (Saïd Taghmaoui) continues to kill people who see the pattern yet do nothing about it.
16	3	"Enemy of My Enemy"	Sanford Bookstaver	Rob Fresco	February 15, 2013	2ATG03	2.56
Calvin messages Martin an address where they will meet. Martin asks Trevor's advice and is made a journalist of his news syndicate, not only as a cover but also as a job. Calvin tells Martin he should also talk to an Aster Corps international sales employee Mallory Kane (Audrey Marie Anderson) that has also become disenchanted with the company. However, Mallory has been captured on the border of Pakistan and is about to be taken to a remote prison, possibly on orders from Aster Corps. Meanwhile, Jake helps Lucy track down another connection to Amelia. A military soldier informs them that his mother, who had a gift similar to Amelia's and Jake's, had been killed. Lucy and Jake talk to the soldier's aunt. She had witnessed the attack and tried to fight off the assailant by stabbing him in the neck. The grieving aunt, Jake and Lucy are helped by Nazim Farzat (Sanjay Chandani), a passing driver who is later revealed to be the contact Martin needs to free the trapped employee. Lucy then shows Martin a group photo with her and Amelia that Jake had found. In the photo's background is Guillermo Ortiz with a scarred neck. Lucy knows he is the one who killed the mother and fears for Amelia's and Jake's safety. Calvin arrives home to greet his mother Frances and Amelia, asking her if she is ready to work.
17	4	"Perfect Storm"	Nelson McCormick	Jennifer Johnson	February 22, 2013	2ATG04	2.51
Martin, not entirely trusting Calvin, has a GPS device implanted on Calvin's computer. This action reveals that Calvin has Amelia, who is shown to be wired to a pachinko machine to predict its results. After previously being told by Martin to not go to the police, Lucy goes to the police about Amelia. However, she is perceived by them to be crazy. Jake's popularity at school grows, leading Soleil to announce they are a couple. Ortiz goes to Martin and Jake's old address and is confronted by Avram, who calls him an "enemy of the 36".
18	5	"Eye to Eye"	Milan Cheylov	Barry O'Brien	March 1, 2013	2ATG05	2.90
Martin, Lucy and Jake are spotted by one of Calvin's men who is told to follow them. Martin later subdues the man but is forced to release him before getting any information. At the news syndicate, Martin informs Trevor about Jake and Amelia's gift. When Martin makes it known that Amelia is kidnapped and Jake could be in danger, Lucy needs persuading to not venture out on her own. Jake later plays with Soleil while her grandfather Carl is nearby. Jake manages to get Carl's cell phone and calls Amelia. He punches in the code 8877 and she knows its meaning. Both later meet and Martin and Lucy soon arrive, but Amelia is whisked away by Calvin's man and Frances. Trevor later tells Lucy that Calvin's foundation has bought a loft in town. She stakes out the place and Calvin arrives. She runs him down with her car. Meanwhile, Ortiz confesses his murderous ways to a priest in Mexico and admits to being one of the "36". Ortiz later kills the priest for not absolving him of his crimes.
19	6	"Broken"	Matt Earl Beesley	Karyn Usher	March 8, 2013	2ATG06	2.60
Fearing the missing Lucy has gone to the police, Martin and Jake prepare to move out. Jake tunes all radios to 89.2 but hears static every time. Amelia hears a sermon on her radio and tells Frances: "They're coming." Someone knocks on their door. Trevor informs Martin about giving Lucy Calvin's address. Alone, he goes to the address but no one answers when he knocks. Inside, Calvin and Lucy make a deal. He'll give her Amelia, if she delivers Jake to him. She agrees and he gives her an address. She collects Jake, leaves Martin a note and goes to the meeting. Martin arrives to retrieve Jake and condemn Lucy for thinking such a thing. However, all three still wait for Calvin. Jake tunes the radio again and hears the same sermon. The three see a radio tower and arrive at a house with Frances' car outside. Inside, they find Calvin. Someone has killed his mother and taken Amelia. Meanwhile, while hiking in Arizona, Ortiz comes across a man who asks him to kill him. Once a pediatric surgeon, the man had caused a boy's death. Ortiz burns pictures of those he's killed himself, takes the doctor to safety and continues his trek. He later arrives in the hills above Los Angeles.
20	7	"Ghosts"	Seith Mann	David Eick	March 15, 2013	2ATG07	2.22
Lucy intends to set out on her own and search for Amelia. Martin promises to continue the search, as Jake secretly puts Martin's phone in her bag. Martin heads to BreakWire, and Lucy receives a call that Martin's retired soldier friend Dutch (Keith David) will be there. She realizes she has the phone and takes it to him. Ortiz also arrives at the building, cuts the power and kills a few people, including Reuben and Dutch. He is hunting Jake. Amelia telepathically communicates with Jake, and he realizes he can also do this. He does the same with Ortiz. Jake knows Ortiz has correlated the murders he has committed to his wife's and son's deaths, which happened on Jake's birthday. The communication causes Ortiz to pause. Martin is able to shoot Ortiz, but he manages to escape again.
21	8	"Reunions"	Roxann Dawson	Brynn Malone	March 22, 2013	2ATG08	2.79
Amelia telepathically communicates with Jake who then leads Martin and Lucy to Calvin. Calvin is trying to locate his former friend Tony, whom he feels is responsible for his mother's death, under the direction of Aster Corps. Meanwhile, Jake attaches himself to a revealing brain scanner. The scan provides more information about Amelia's whereabouts, as well as a way for Calvin to finally communicate with his brain-damaged brother (David Hoflin). Armed with leads to Amelia's location, Martin and Lucy infiltrate a secret Aster Corps facility to find her. The mother and daughter reunion is brief, as they are spotted and Lucy sacrifices herself to let Amelia escape.
22	9	"Clockwork"	Nelson McCormick	Carol Barbee	March 29, 2013	2ATG09	2.37
Jake gives Martin a picture of Philip Green, who is on death row for a triple murder. With the execution in a matter of hours, Martin rushes to the prison to look for answers, but Green won't reveal anything unless he is reunited with his estranged daughter — Dr. Kate Gordon (Annie Wersching). Martin then learns Philip had murdered Aster Corps employees who had sought his device—the cipher—that would contact the Thirty-Six. Green reunites with Kate, but is still executed. Before his execution, Green sends Martin a message that Jake knows where the cipher is and they find it. Martin finds out about Lucy's death from Trevor.
23	10	"Two of a Kind"	Michael Waxman	Rob Fresco	April 5, 2013	2ATG10	2.29
After hearing that only Lucy's body was found in a car at the bottom of a ravine, Martin surmises that Amelia is still alive. She visits Jake and tells him Ortiz is still alive and coming for him. She also believes that, if Martin finds her, he will turn her over to the police. Jake uses the cipher, which reveals the numbers 10262000 — Jake's birthday. At Amelia's insistence, he shows the numbers to Martin, who asks Trevor to use BreakWire's resources to learn more about the number. Feverish, Jake speaks his first words to Martin: "Find him." Martin believes he speaks of Ortiz. Elsewhere, Ortiz searches for Dr. Nell Plimpton (Samantha Whittaker), whom we first saw in the pilot episode and who is one of the righteous "36" who has been seen with an artifact covered in hieroglyphs. Meanwhile, Calvin Norburg meets with Aster Corps CEO Nicole Farington (Frances Fisher), who introduces him to the first quantum computer in an attempt to woo him back to the company. The computer has decoded a 90-sequence number, the "God Sequence". Ortiz follows Nell to a university that Jake and Amelia have sneaked into in order to look at the artifact. Martin arrives and helps Nell escape Ortiz, who believes he is a complete failure and slices his own throat. Martin later tells Avram that Ortiz mentioned a "nest of seven" before he died. At home, Martin promises Amelia to find her father and thanks Jake for finding her, calling her a part of the family.
24	11	"Accused"	Adam Kane	Barry O'Brien	April 26, 2013	2ATG11	2.22
Martin believes he may have found a police investigator whom he could trust in Detective Lange (Mykelti Williamson). He tells Lange the entire story of his long running struggle to keep Jake, Amelia, and Lucy safe from Aster Corps. Martin also hands Lange a paper with the number "3021" marked on it by Jake. Martin explains to Lange that this number should be a sign to him of the way Jake uses numbers. After Farington shows Calvin the studies that Aster Corps is performing on six of the 36, under the guise of helping them with sleep disorders, Calvin agrees to return to the company. Meanwhile, Aster Corps attempts to frame Martin with the murder of Lucy (whom they had in fact murdered themselves). Detective Lange is forced to arrest Martin based on the frame-up evidence provided to him by Aster Corps, but Calvin posts Martin's bail. Calvin then reveals he knows that Aster Corps was behind his mother's murder, and he is seeking revenge. Jake and Avram attempt to persuade Dr. Robert McCormick (Bernard White), one of the 36, to leave Aster Corps' treatment program, but so far have failed. Some men in a van observe Avram in this attempt and abduct him, but Jake gets away with his father.
25	12	"Fight or Flight"	Milan Cheylov	Brynn Malone	May 3, 2013	2ATG12	2.19
Dr. McCormick, in view of Martin and Trevor, suffers a seizure and dies. Calvin discovers that the sleep "treatments" are burning up the patients' frontal lobes. Calvin also overhears Farington trying to get an accountant to "cook the books" for the company, but the man refuses. She admits to Calvin that Aster Corps has $40 billion in losses due to bad investments and acquisitions, and that the news is close to going public. This explains her haste in getting the predictive sequence revealed. Trevor goes undercover as a sleep patient, and with Jake's help (via cell phone and number "53"), he is able to meet the qualifications and get admitted. He discovers that Dr. Nell Plimpton, despite Martin's warnings, has returned to the center and is starting to exhibit the same symptoms that McCormick had before he died. Calvin sees through Trevor's ruse, knowing that only Jake could have provided the test results, and he helps Martin save Dr. Plimpton. Trevor manages to get proof of Aster Corps crimes back to Detective Lange, just as Martin's car is intentionally broadsided, knocking him unconscious. Aster Corps thugs take both Jake and Amelia from the car.
26	13	"Leviathan"	Nelson McCormick	Tim Kring	May 10, 2013	2ATG13	2.42
Jake and Amelia are taken to a ship and are greeted by Farington. At the hospital, Martin wakes to discover Jake and Amelia were not in the car with him when the paramedics arrived. He and Trevor find a pair of gloves in his wrecked car and take them to the police, where they by using Jake's latest number "318" identify one of them as Joseph Tanner (D. B. Sweeney). At that time, a judge revokes Martin's bail, but Lange lets him go free. Elsewhere, Avram finds himself held captive by a rabbi (Ron Rifkin) of his sect, for meddling with the 36. The rabbi explains that transpiring events will either result in the end of the world or the sequence being made public. He also shows Avram the completed sequence. On the ship, Dr. Linus (Leland Orser) prepares to induce comas on both Jake and Amelia when they attempt escape, with Calvin's help, but all are caught. Trevor and Martin discover Tanner's recorded conversations with Farington, including one in which Farington orders the hit on Lucy. He is tortured and reveals the children's location. The tests, which complete the sequence, are begun on the children. Amelia convulses. In her alternate reality, she tells Jake that she is "losing her ability" and that she must leave, which Jake interprets that she is dead. Martin arrives at the ship, shoots Dr. Linus in the leg, and revives Jake. Calvin rescues Amelia, who is nearly dead. Farington attempts to call security, but Martin tells her to turn on the news. All of her illicit activities have been broadcast worldwide, including her conversation commanding Lucy to be killed. Federal agents and the police arrive to arrest everyone responsible. Calvin discovers his brother is dead at the hospital and is subsequently arrested by Lange. Avram admits to the rabbi that he was wrong to meddle, and is allowed to go free. The rabbi is seen marking Amelia's name out of a book which lists the 36, knowing her ability is gone. Martin's life must now resume. He tells Amelia that he will do all he can to find her father, but for now she is part of their family. Before departing, Avram gives Martin the amulet Guillermo used and says that, until Jake is old enough, Martin is the protector of the 36.

== International broadcast ==
Country	Channel	Premiere date
Australia	Network Ten; Fox8	April 22, 2012
Austria	ORF eins	February 27, 2012 (Pilot); March 26, 2012 (regular)
Brazil	Fox Brasil	March 19, 2012
China; Southeast Asia	Fox Asia	March 25, 2012
Belgium	BeTV (in French)	June 7, 2012
Belgium	2BE	September 3, 2012
Bulgaria	bTV	July 30, 2014
Canada	Global	January 25, 2012
Canada	addikTV (in French)	September 25, 2012
Croatia		March 27, 2012
Czech Republic	Prima Cool	December 23, 2013
Denmark	TV 2	January 19, 2013
Finland	MTV3	October 9, 2012
France	M6	September 14, 2013
Germany	Pro 7	February 27, 2012 (pilot); March 26, 2012 (regular) (season 1); January 24, 2015 (season 2)
Greece; Cyprus	FX	March 22, 2012
Hong Kong	TVB Pearl	December 18, 2012
Hungary	RTL2	October 13, 2013
India	STAR World India	March 24, 2012
Israel	Yes Action	March 20, 2012
Italy	Fox	March 20, 2012
Latin America; Argentina; Chile; Colombia; Costa Rica; Ecuador; El Salvador; Paraguay; Peru; Uruguay; Venezuela	Canal Fox	March 19, 2012
Lithuania	TV3	May 8, 2013
(North Macedonia) Macedonia	Fox Life	March 27, 2012
Mexico	Canal Fox	March 19, 2012
Mexico	Canal 5	August 14, 2013
Netherlands	Fox NL	August 23, 2013
New Zealand	TV3	March 25, 2012
Norway	TV 2	March 19, 2012
Philippines	Jack TV and JACK City on BEAM TV 31	March 18, 2012
Poland	Fox	March 26, 2012
Portugal	Fox	March 20, 2012
Russia	Channel One	March 25, 2012
Serbia		March 27, 2012
Slovakia	TV JOJ	June 20, 2014
Slovenia		March 27, 2012
Spain	Fox España	March 22, 2012
Spain	Cuatro	July 8, 2013
Sweden	Kanal 11	September 23, 2013
Switzerland	Pro 7	February 27, 2012 (pilot); March 26, 2012 (regular)
Switzerland	RTS Un (in French)	March 31, 2013
Taiwan; Indonesia; Malaysia; Singapore; Thailand	Fox Asia	March 25, 2012
United Kingdom (Republic of Ireland) Ireland	Sky1	March 20, 2012
Vietnam	STAR Movies Asia	March 28, 2012

== Reception ==
=== Critical reception ===
The first season of the show was met with "generally favorable" reviews, and obtained a Metacritic score of 63/100. The second season received "mixed or average" reviews with a Metacritic score of 60/100.

Michael Landweber of PopMatters called the first episode "stunningly effective", and said that "its mix of spirituality and science, familial and global struggles, is galvanising." He also noted that "The boy's narration, unnervingly matter-of-fact about the nature of the universe, takes on more power when he reveals that in 11 years, he has never spoken a word." In a review for the New York Post, Linda Stasi said "If you can't get enough of number sequences and universal cylindrical patterns that constantly repeat [...] then for sure you'll repeat the pattern of watching Fox's new show." She added, "Yes, the show is intriguing, and it's great to have Sutherland back on TV. But frankly, it's awfully complicated." Lori Rackl of the Chicago Sun-Times said the show "operates on the mind-blowing premise that people around the world are linked to one another and their lives intersect—with potentially major repercussions". She finished the review saying it "delivers a suspenseful ride around the world, peppered with some tear-jerking moments. The bar has been set high. Here's hoping "Touch" continues to reach it." Kiefer Sutherland's performance also gained praise, with Landweber saying "Sutherland, however, plays the part with such a combination of intensity and subtlety that we are drawn deep into Martin's suffering, and rather than judging him, we feel with him. Every trial is etched in his face. He imbued Jack Bauer with similar stoicism, but Martin seems less resilient, more distressed."

Verne Gay of Newsday called the second season "more fun", adding "you have plain old smashmouth elemental TV story devices—good guys, bad guys, evil corporations, a family unit, and a headlong rush toward the Truth, whatever that may be." The New York Times' Neil Genzlinger called the season "considerably darker and more complex", adding "The intricacies may make it harder for new viewers to crack the show without doing some catch-up watching, but they also make it far more absorbing." David Hinckley of the Daily News found two problems with the second season—"characters like popups in a video game" and "as the action ramps up, Jake's gift recedes." He added, "The show still has some interesting things happening, and there are worse things on TV than a fast-paced action drama."

=== Ratings ===
Touch debuted to over 12 million viewers in the pilot episode, with the next episode pulling in more than 11.8 million. But ratings fell sharply after that, and the season one finale garnered just 4.6 million viewers. After the first two episodes of season two, all of the remaining 11 episodes fell short of 3 million viewers, leading to the series cancellation.

U.S. television ratings for Touch
Season	Time slot (ET)	# Ep.	Premiered		Ended		TV Season	Rank	Viewers (in millions)
Season	Time slot (ET)	# Ep.	Date	Premiere viewers (in millions)	Date	Finale viewers (in millions)	TV Season	Rank	Viewers (in millions)
1	Thursday 9:00 pm	13	January 25, 2012	12.01	September 14, 2012	4.60	2011–12	#45	9.18
2	Friday 9:00 pm	13	February 8, 2013	3.94	May 10, 2013	2.42	2012–13	#121	3.65

=== Accolades ===
Year	Association	Category	Nominee	Result
2012	Primetime Emmy Awards	Outstanding Main Title Theme Music		Nominated
2012	Primetime Emmy Awards	Outstanding Special Visual Effects		Nominated
2012	Teen Choice Awards	Choice Television Drama Show		Nominated
2012	Teen Choice Awards	Choice Actor: Drama	Kiefer Sutherland	Nominated
2013	Young Artist Awards	Best Performance in a TV Series - Leading Young Actor	David Mazouz	Nominated
