= Marching Out of Time =

- Directed by: Anton Vassil
- Starring: Frederick Andersen; Heinrich James; Robert Z'Dar
- Distributed by: Artist View Entertainment
- Release date: 1993
- Country: United States
- Language: English

Marching Out of Time is a 1993 comedy film directed by Anton Vassil. It is about time-traveling Nazis.

== Plot summary ==
When German World War II soldiers are mistakenly teleported to present-day Venice Beach, California, by his next-door neighbor, American Fred Johnson must stop them from taking vital information back through time and altering the course of history, and finds himself time-traveling to 1942.

== Main cast ==
- Frederick Andersen – Fred Johnson
- Heinrich James – Lt. von Konst
- Matthew Henerson – Prof. Memo
- Jeff Rector – Lt. Butch
- Robert Z'Dar – Muck
- Jim Boeven – Maj. Fuerst

== Main credits ==
- Music composed and conducted by David Rubinstein
- Director of Photography: Greg Daniels
- 1st Assistant Director: Francis Lawrence
- Additional Music by Marc Crandall
- Casting by Eric de Santo
- Stunt Supervisors: Pete Porteous and Kent Ducanon
- Miniature Effects by Ted Crittenden
