= Loyola Marymount University =

Jesuit university in Los Angeles, California, US

Coordinates: 33.9700°N 118.418°W

- Former names: St. Vincent's College (1865–1911, 1915–1917); L.A. College (1911–1915); Loyola College of Los Angeles (1917–1930); Loyola University of Los Angeles (1930–1973); Also: Marymount Junior College (1932–1948); Marymount College (1948–1973)
- Motto: Ad majorem Dei gloriam (Latin); Tua Luce Dirige (Latin)
- Motto in English: For the greater glory of God; Direct us by thy light
- Type: Private research university
- Established: 1865; 161 years ago (1911, assignment to Jesuits)
- Religious affiliation: Catholic (Jesuit, Religious of the Sacred Heart of Mary, Sisters of St. Joseph of Orange)
- Academic affiliations: AJCU; ACCU; NAICU
- Endowment: $722.7 million (2024)
- President: Thomas Poon
- Provost: Kat Weaver
- Faculty: 615
- Students: 10,000 (fall 2024)
- Undergraduates: 7,094 (fall 2024)
- Postgraduates: 2,906 (fall 2024)
- Location: Los Angeles, California, U.S.
- Campus: Urban 150 acres (60.7 ha)
- Fight song: "Fight on Loyola"
- Colors: Crimson and blue
- Nickname: Lions
- Sporting affiliations: NCAA Division I – WCC, PCSC
- Mascot: Iggy the Lion
- Website: lmu.edu

Loyola Marymount University (LMU) is a private Jesuit and Marymount research university in Los Angeles, California, United States. LMU enrolls over 10,000 undergraduate and graduate students, making it the largest Catholic university on the West Coast of the United States. It was founded in 1865 by the Vincentians and merged with Marymount College in 1973.

The university includes the Bellarmine College of Liberal Arts, the Frank R. Seaver College of Science and Engineering, the College of Business Administration, the School of Film and Television, the College of Communication & Fine Arts, and the School of Education. It is the parent school to Loyola Law School.

LMU offers 55 major and 58 minor undergraduate programs and 47 master's degree programs, an education doctorate, a doctorate in juridical science, a doctorate in business administration, a Juris Doctor, and 13 credential programs. It is classified among "R2: Doctoral Universities – High research activity". LMU's sports teams are called the Lions and compete at the NCAA Division I level as members of the West Coast Conference in 20 sports.

Loyola Marymount University faculty and alumni include CEOs of Fortune 500 companies, U.S. governors, members of the United States Congress, Olympic gold medalists, athletes in the NBA, MLB, NFL and MLS, winners of Academy Awards, Emmy Awards, Golden Globe Awards, and Grammy Awards, a Pulitzer Prize winner and a Nobel Prize winner.

== History ==
=== Founding of St. Vincent's College ===
The university was originally known as St. Vincent's College for Boys, founded and run by the Vincentians until 1911. The university served as the first institution of higher learning in Southern California. In 1865, the Vincentians were commissioned by Thaddeus Amat y Brusi to found the school in Los Angeles. John Asmuth was the first president-rector. Classes were held for two years in the Lugo Adobe on the east side of the Plaza while a new campus building remained under construction. The historic building, donated by Don Vicente Lugo, was one of few two-story adobes in the city at the time, standing across Alameda Street between the Plaza and Union Station (near Olvera Street).

St. Vincent's College, from the east over Grand Ave., north of Los Angeles Trade–Technical College, 1905

The new 7th Street campus, a stone building now called St. Vincent's Place, encompassed a block bounded by Fort (Broadway), 6th, Hill, and 7th streets. In 1869, St. Vincent's was accredited by the state. In 1887, the college moved to a new campus, bordered by Grand Avenue, Washington Boulevard, Hope Street, and 18th. The campus had a chapel, residence hall, cottages, and traditional brick-and-ivy complex housing classrooms and lecture halls. The new campus retained a tall, central tower topped with St. Vincent's trademark mansard roof.

Alongside campus expansion, the athletic program grew, and the Catholic Collegiates competed against Occidental College's Presbyterians and the University of Southern California's Methodists. St. Vincent's athletes were also recruited into professional sports. During this era, from St. Vincent's College graduated numerous notable alumni, including Isidore Dockweiler, Eugene Biscailuz and Leo Carrillo.

=== Loyola College ===
In 1911, the Vincentians left educational ministry. Thomas James Conaty appointed the Jesuits as the Vincentians replacement. The group moved the college to a larger property and renamed the school Los Angeles College. The campus consisted of several bungalows at Avenue 52, Highland Park, Los Angeles. The old campus became St. Vincent's School. In 1922, St. Vincent's campus was sold. Over time, the historic buildings of old St. Vincent's College have been torn down and replaced by developments such as the Grand Olympic Auditorium (1924) and parking lots. Richard A. Gleeson was the first Jesuit president of the institution.

Rapid growth prompted the Jesuits to seek a new campus on Venice Boulevard in 1917. Graduate instruction began in 1920 with the foundation of a separate law school, the only program into which women were admitted. The law school was the second in Los Angeles after USC to admit Jewish students. In 1928, the undergraduate division of Loyola relocated to the present Westchester campus in 1930, becoming Loyola University of Los Angeles. Loyola Law School did not move with the rest of the university, but in 1964 was reestablished at a Frank Gehry-designed campus in downtown Los Angeles.

As enrollment dropped during World War II, university president Edward Whelan brokered a deal with the US Army to form an officer training program for both Army and Navy officers. The contract allowed the university to remain open during the war. Enrollment hit all-time highs as returning veterans took advantage of the G.I. Bill in the mid-to-late 1940s. During World War II, President Whelan was openly critical of the treatment of Japanese Americans and the establishment of Japanese internment camps.

In 1949, Charles Cassassa, S.J. was named president. His work included the formation of a graduate division on the Westchester campus in June 1950 and the establishment of the Teacher Education Program during the preceding two years. Cassassa also expanded campus infrastructure and established the Institute of Human Relations to promote improved racial relations in business and government. In 1950, he ordered the school's football team to forfeit an away game against Texas Western since the school's rules prevented African-American players, including Loyola team member Bill English, to play on their field. With several notable exceptions, Loyola University continued as an all-male school until its merger with Marymount College in 1973.

At the time of the Watts riots in 1965, Loyola and Marymount were predominantly white institutions. In response to the riots and the evolving local civil rights movement, Black students organized a Black students' union in 1968. In response, Loyola president Fr. Casassa issued policies on 'unlawful student protests'. Despite Fr. Casassa's lack of cooperation, the Black Student Union of Loyola pledged that it would "work through established channels, to dialogue, and to present our case in an intelligent, cohesive, and non-violent fashion." When the campus newspaper The Loyolan surveyed students, most were generally supportive of introducing inclusive courses such as Black history.

=== Founding of Marymount ===
The Religious of the Sacred Heart of Mary began teaching local young women in 1923. After invitation by John Joseph Cantwell, seven sisters of the Religious of the Sacred Heart of Mary, led by Mother Cecilia Rafter, formed an elementary school which developed into Marymount High School. Within a decade, high student demand prompted the Marymount sisters to open Marymount Junior College in Westwood in 1933.

Mother Gertrude Cain was the first president of the junior college and guided its development into a four-year college. In 1948, the college assumed the name Marymount College of Los Angeles. In 1960, having outgrown its shared Westwood campus, Marymount College moved its programs to the Palos Verdes Peninsula in southwestern Los Angeles, becoming Marymount California University.

In 1967 Raymunde McKay, president of Marymount College, alongside Mary Felix Montgomery General Superior of the Sisters of Saint Joseph of Orange, merged Marymount College with St. Joseph College of Orange. St. Joseph College was originally formed as St. Joseph Teacher's College, a junior college affiliated with The Catholic University of America in 1953. In 1959 it was incorporated as an autonomous, four-year institution, and assumed the St. Joseph College name. However, in 1968 Marymount and St. Joseph's Colleges merged under the Marymount name with an agreement that the traditions and heritage of both the Religious of the Sacred Heart of Mary and the Sisters of St. Joseph of Orange would be retained.

Subsequently, the institution was renamed Marymount College of Orange. During the academic year, it remained a college for women religious seeking their baccalaureate degrees; college courses were offered to men and women during the summers at the Orange campus. However, in the same year, Marymount College began its affiliation with Loyola University, moving its four-year program at the Palos Verdes campus to the Westchester campus of Loyola University.

=== Loyola-Marymount merger and expansion ===
By the mid-1960s, Loyola University of Los Angeles had unsuccessfully petitioned the Archbishop of Los Angeles, James Francis McIntyre, to allow coeducation for several years. In 1967, McIntyre permitted McKay to begin an affiliation with Loyola University. In 1968 when Marymount's baccalaureate program moved to Loyola's Westchester campus; this arrangement of two independent schools on one campus continued for five years. In 1970, the Student Governments of Loyola University (ASLU—Associated Students of Loyola University) and Marymount College (ASMC—Associated Students of Marymount College) joined to form the Associated Students of Loyola and Marymount (ASLM).

Loyola University and Marymount College officially merged and assumed the name Loyola Marymount University in 1973. The expanded university retained its roots of Catholic higher education and incorporated the educational traditions of the Jesuits, Marymount sisters, and Orange sisters into one institution. The ASLM became known as the Associated Students of Loyola Marymount University (ASLMU). Donald Merrifield, who first assumed the presidency of Loyola University in 1969, continued his role after the merger. The academic vice president of Marymount College, Renee Harrangue, became the provost. During Merrifield's tenure, thirteen new buildings were constructed on Loyola Marymount's main campus. Merrifield oversaw the expansion of Loyola Law School's campus in Pico-Union, near downtown Los Angeles. Merrifield and the university commissioned architect Frank Gehry to design the new campus, which was needed to accommodate increased enrollment.

Merrifield also implemented a number of programs to increase minority enrollment, such as financial aid packages and scholarships, and added African American and Latino studies programs. He stepped down as president of Loyola Marymount in 1984, but remained the university's chancellor until 2002.

=== Recent history ===
In 2007, the university reestablished its presence in Orange County, California when the Theological Studies Department began offering a two-year master's program in Pastoral Theology in Orange, California. The first cohort graduated in the spring of 2009 with three additional cohorts completing a three-year master's degree in Pastoral Theology until the cohort program ended in 2018. The classes were held in the Marywood offices of the Diocese of Orange and then at the Diocese's Christ Cathedral campus, each nearby the former Orange Campus of the university.

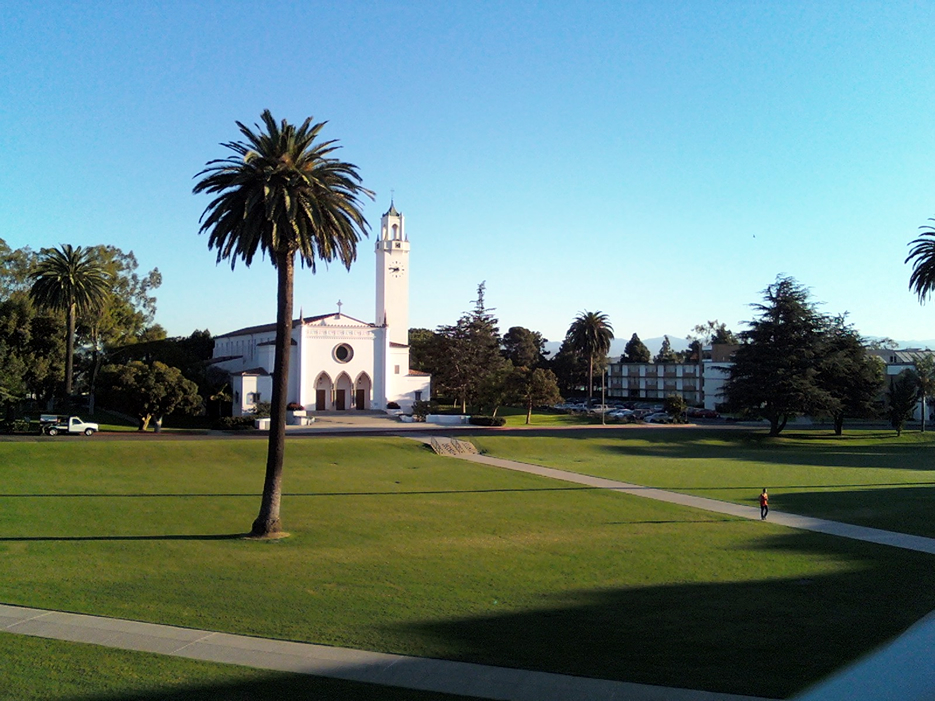
The Sunken Gardens and Sacred Heart Chapel

Xavier Hall

In 2010, Loyola Marymount President Robert B. Lawton announced his retirement. Lawton cited health problems, including a slow recovery from a 2009 back surgery, as the main reason for his departure. He had served as president since 1999.

David W. Burcham became the first lay president in the school's history. Burcham held the office from 2010 to 2015. Timothy Law Snyder became the 16th president in 2015. Thomas Poon became the 17th president in 2025.

=== Faculty Union ===
During Summer of 2024, the Non-tenured track faculty at three of the university's colleges voted 227–29 to unionize. In November, the Visiting Assistant Professors across all six colleges likewise voted to unionize. Loyola Marymount University recognized both unions and raised no objections to their certification.

Between December 2024 and Summer 2025, the new faculty unions presented proposals to Loyola Marymount University. Rather than provide counter-proposals regarding compensation, the school's Board of Trustees unanimously decided to cease recognition of the union on September 12, 2025, under the pretext of a "religious exemption."

On September 30, the non-tenured track faculty and visiting assistant professors overwhelmingly voted to authorize a strike, though no strike date was announced at that time. As of October 2025, this issue is ongoing.

== Campus ==
LMU is located on the Del Rey Hills in the Westchester neighborhood of Los Angeles. It overlooks the former site of Hughes Aircraft. The original 99 acres (40 ha) were donated to the university by Harry Culver, a prominent real-estate developer. Xavier Hall, named for St. Francis Xavier, and St. Robert's Hall, named after St. Robert Bellarmine, a cardinal and Doctor of the Church, were the first two buildings to be built on the current Westchester Campus. Following their completion in 1929, Xavier Hall housed both the Jesuit Faculty and the students at the time while St. Robert's Hall served as the academic and administrative building.

Sacred Heart Chapel and the Regents Bell Tower were the next non-residential structures to be built on the campus (1953–55). The Malone Student Center, named after Lorenzo M. Malone, an alumnus of the university and former dean of students and treasurer of the university, was completed in 1958 and renovated in 1996. LMU now houses 36 academic, athletic, administrative, and event facilities as well as twelve on-campus residence halls and six on-campus apartment complexes. The campus houses four large open grass areas not reserved exclusively for athletic play.

LMU acquired the 1,000,000-square-foot (93,000 m^{2}) building in January 2000 from Raytheon, which bought Hughes Aircraft. LMU completed the interior remodel in April 2001. The building, which houses the university's Bellarmine College of Liberal Arts, is constructed of steel and concrete and is divided into seven structures above ground.

In 2022 The Princeton Review ranked LMU as having the fourth-most beautiful campus in America.

=== Sustainability ===
LMU has a large solar electric rooftop array that generates 868,000 kilowatt-hours of electricity annually, providing 6% of the annual campus electrical needs. The university purchased another 6 percent of its electrical energy through Renewable Energy Credits.

There are three LEED-certified buildings on campus, including the William H. Hannon Library. All new and renovated roofing projects include installation of a highly reflective white membrane cool roof.

Student sustainability jobs are available in the recycling program. Loyola Marymount earned a grade of a "B−" on the College Sustainability Report Card 2010, published by the Sustainable Endowments Institute.

== Academics ==
Loyola Marymount is home to six colleges and schools, in addition to being the parent school of Loyola Law School in downtown Los Angeles.

LMU offers 55 major and 58 minor undergraduate programs and 47 master's degree programs, an education doctorate, a doctorate in juridical science, a doctorate in business administration, a Juris Doctor, and 13 credential programs. LMU offers an Air Force ROTC program, an Honors Program which focus on an enriched core curriculum. Furthermore, it provides several year-long, semester, and summer study abroad programs which occur in the Americas, Europe, Africa, Asia, and Australia. Incoming students for 2022 come from 45 states and 64 countries.

LMU has a Carnegie Classification of R2- Doctoral University: High Research Activity. Carnegie gives this ranking to "institutions that awarded at least 20 research/scholarship doctoral degrees and had at least $5 million in total research expenditures (as reported through the National Science Foundation (NSF) Higher Education Research & Development Survey (HERD))."

=== Undergraduate admissions ===
Freshman Admission Statistics
	2025	2024	2023	2022	2018	2014
Applicants	N/A	23,089	23,361	21,312	18,081	12,117
Admits	N/A	10,409	9,413	8,240	8,498	6,387
% Admitted	39%	45%	40%	38%	47%	52.7%
Enrolled	N/A	1,541	1,535	1,710	1,500	1,348
SAT Math + Reading range	N/A	1280–1400	1280–1430	1290–1420	1210–1390	1100–1300
ACT range	N/A	28–32	29–33	28–32	27–31	25–30
Avg GPA	N/A	3.97	4.01	3.92	3.81	3.75

U.S. News & World Report classifies Loyola Marymount's selectivity as "more selective" with a 2023 acceptance rate of 40% and an early acceptance rate of 52.4%. Half the applicants admitted to Loyola Marymount University who submitted test scores have an ACT score between 29 and 32.

=== Rankings ===
Academic rankings

National
- Forbes: 142
- U.S. News & World Report: 109
- Washington Monthly: 785
- WSJ/College Pulse: 308

Undergraduate demographics as of Fall 2020
Race and ethnicity	Total
White	43%
Hispanic	23%
Asian	10%
Foreign national	10%
Other (Note: Other consists of Multiracial Americans & those who prefer to not say.)	7%
Black	7%
Economic diversity
Low-income (Note: The percentage of students who received an income-based federal Pell grant intended for low-income students.)	12%
Affluent (Note: The percentage of students who are a part of the American middle class at the bare minimum.)	88%

- U.S. News & World Report's "Best Colleges 2024" ranked Loyola Marymount tied for 91s in the U.S. among national universities. U.S. News & World Report also ranked Loyola Marymount tied for 31st in Best Undergraduate Teaching, tied for 57th Best for Veterans, and 127th Best Value school in the national universities category
- The Wall Street Journal, in its "2026 Best Colleges in the U.S.", ranked Loyola Marymount 308th in the country.
- The Hollywood Reporter, ranked LMU the fifth best Film School in the country in its "Top 25 American Film Schools" 2024 edition
- The Wrap ranked LMU fifth in the country in its Top 50 Film Schools of 2023.

=== Bellarmine College of Liberal Arts ===
The Bellarmine College of Liberal Arts includes twenty-five undergraduate programs of study as well as five graduate programs. The college is named for Saint Robert Bellarmine.

=== College of Communication and Fine Arts ===
The College of Communication and Fine Arts offers undergraduate majors as well as a graduate program in Marital and Family Therapy. Pulitzer Prize-winning playwright Beth Henley teaches playwriting in the Theatre Department. Colin Hanks transferred to LMU from the acting program and Chapman University. Linda Cardellini and Busy Philipps are also alumni from the Theatre Department. Many of the faculty in the department are currently working in the industry.

=== College of Business Administration ===
The College of Business Administration is home to undergraduate programs, an MBA program for graduate studies, and a Business Law minor program exclusively for business majors. The undergraduate business program was ranked No. 77 in the 2024 edition of U.S. News Best College guide and the college was also ranked in several specific areas: for entrepreneurship, No. 12; international business, No. 15; analytics, No. 18; marketing, No. 19; management, No. 26; finance, No. 30; and accounting, to No. 31. LMU's Part-Time MBA Program was ranked 6th nationwide by Bloomberg Businessweek in their 2013 rankings

=== Frank R. Seaver College of Science and Engineering ===
The Frank R. Seaver College of Science and Engineering contains undergraduate and graduate programs. Graduate programs are offered in civil, electrical and mechanical engineering, in environmental science, in computer science, in systems engineering, and in dual program called systems engineering and leadership (SE+MBA).

LMU's undergraduate engineering program is ranked No. 23 by U.S. News Best Colleges Guide.

=== School of Education ===
The School of Education at Loyola Marymount has four undergraduate and nine graduate programs of study including a Doctorate in Education (Ed.D.).

=== School of Film and Television ===
The School of Film and Television was established in 2003 by consolidating LMU's programs in film and television. In 2014, it was the fifth highest ranked film program in the United States according to The Hollywood Reporter and the fifth highest ranked program, according to College Factual (USA Today). In 2018, it opened a 35,000 square foot facility, primarily for graduate film students. The Playa Vista campus includes three greenscreen studios, eight Avid editing rooms and a Foley stage. In the spring of 2020, dean Peggy Rajski broke ground on the Howard B. Fitzpatrick Pavilion, a 25,000-square-foot structure equipped with a screening theater, a camera-teaching stage and a motion-capture workspace, which is due to open in the fall of 2021. Unlike some other film programs, LMU film students own the intellectual property rights to the films they create while they are in college.

Notable alumni from LMU's film school include Barbara Broccoli, producer of James Bond films since 1990, James Wong, Brian Helgeland, writer/director of the Jackie Robinson biopic 42, Francis Lawrence, director of three of The Hunger Games films, and David Mirkin, an executive producer and showrunner for The Simpsons.

=== Loyola Law School ===
Loyola Law School's Frank Gehry-designed campus is in the Pico-Union neighborhood west of downtown Los Angeles and is separate from the Westchester main university campus. Including its day and evening J.D. programs, Loyola was the first California law school with a pro bono graduation requirement, under which students perform 40 hours of pro bono work.

U.S. News & World Report ranked Loyola Law School 61st in its "America's Best Graduate Schools 2024" feature. The Law School fell 10 places to 71 in 2025.

== Organization ==
The university cabinet consists of: the president, executive vice president & provost, senior vice president & chief academic officer (under whose direction the deans of the Bellarmine College of Liberal Arts, College of Business Administration, College of Communication and Fine Arts, Seaver College of Science and Engineering, School of Education, School of Film and Television, and University Libraries operate), senior vice president for administration, senior vice president & chief financial officer, senior vice president for student affairs, senior vice president for university relations, and senior vice president Fritz B. Burns Dean of Loyola Law School.

The Jesuit Community is headed by a rector (appointed by the Superior General of the Society of Jesus); the Religious of the Sacred Heart of Mary are led by local coordinator who report to the provincial superior of the Western American Province; and the Sisters of St. Joseph of Orange are led by a local superior who reports to the general superior of their congregation. Each of the three sponsoring religious communities is represented on the board of trustees.

== Sponsoring religious orders ==
LMU is sponsored primarily by three religious orders that have long been associated with education, the Society of Jesus, the Religious of the Sacred Heart of Mary, and the Sisters of St. Joseph of Orange.

=== Society of Jesus ===
LMU is home to around 35 Jesuits holding various positions in administrative, staff, and faculty positions.

=== Religious of the Sacred Heart of Mary ===
The Religious of the Sacred Heart of Mary also house several religious sisters adjacent campus. From 1968 until 1999 the sisters lived on campus in the Thomas and Dorothy Leavey Center. In 1999, they donated the building to the university and moved into residential houses off campus. The Western American provincial center, which had been in the Leavey center, was moved to Montebello. The Marymount Sisters sponsor the Marymount Institute for Faith, Culture, and the Arts which attempts to preserve the transformative educational tradition of the Religious of the Sacred Heart of Mary and promotes a dialogue between faith and culture as expressed in fine, performing, literary and communication arts.

== Campus ministry ==
Loyola Marymount's Office of Campus Ministry is a component to the promotion of the university's mission and identity. Founded in 1911 as the University Chaplain, this division became known as Campus Ministry in 1973 with a stipulation that the Director would be a Jesuit. By 1986 this requirement was waived when Sr. Margaret Mary Dolan, R.S.H.M. became the director. Dolan, an alumna of Marymount College's class of 1958, received her Master's from LMU in 1974 and also served the university as a campus minister, director of alumni relations, residence hall minister, and alumni chaplain since 1973.

In 2008, as part of the university's Centennial Capital Campaign, it was announced that an $8 million fundraising goal was set to endow the office as the "Peg Dolan, RSHM Campus Ministry Center" in honor of Dolan's contributions to the university. The same year, the university asked her to address the class of 2008 at the undergraduate commencement exercises and she was awarded an honorary doctorate. At the dedication ceremony in September 2008, over 700 alumni returned to campus to honor her legacy at the university. When Dolan died in 2009, more than 1,000 people returned to campus for two days of liturgies celebrating her life.

Located at the north end of the university, Sacred Heart Chapel is the main worship space on campus. A basilica-style church, Sacred Heart has two side altars and the Mary chapel, which is located behind the crucifix, in addition to the main chapel space. The chapel is lined by tall stained-glass windows.

== Academy of Catholic Thought and Imagination ==
The Academy of Catholic Thought and Imagination (ACTI) at Loyola Marymount University is a hub for scholarship, interdisciplinary research, pedagogy, and outreach on LMU's campus and in the southwest United States. ACTI sponsors and co-sponsors events, supports interdisciplinary dialogue within the university, and publishes academic work promoting its mission. It was founded in 2014.

== The Marymount Institute for Faith, Culture, and the Arts ==
Founded in 1991, the Marymount Institute encourages interdisciplinary and intercultural scholarly and artistic activity in the form of research, publication, exhibits, performances, conferences, seminars, and lectures.

2008 saw the opening of the Marymount Institute Press. Itself an imprint of Tsehai Publishers and Distributors, the MIP was founded by the Ethiopian-born journalist, publisher, and social activist, Elias Wondimu, and already has two publications to its credit: "Panim el Panim: Facing Genesis, Visual Midrash" and "A Journey into Love: Meditating with Piers Plowman".

The President's Marymount Institute Professor in Residence is Nobel Laureate Wole Soyinka.

== Athletics ==
Loyola Marymount's mascot is the Lion; the school's primary athletic affiliation is with the West Coast Conference. While LMU has had success in several sports, it is probably best remembered for its men's basketball teams between 1985 and 1990. These teams won the WCC tournament in 1988 and 1989, won the WCC regular season championship in 1988 and 1990, and made appearances in the NCAA Tournament in 1988, 1989, and 1990. In 1990 the team advanced to the Elite Eight.Paul Westhead as served as head coach.The tragic death of star player Hank Gathers (#44), who collapsed during the second round of the WCC tournament on March 4, 1990, occurred during this time as well. Hank Gaithers', and his teammate Bo Kimble's, jerseys have been retired at LMU.

Especially well-remembered was the 1990 team, led by Gathers and Kimble until tragedy struck in the WCC tournament. Gathers collapsed during a game and died due to a previously diagnosed heart condition. Playing for their fallen teammate, the Lions advanced to the Elite Eight (regional final) of the NCAA tournament before falling to eventual champions UNLV.

The primary indoor athletic facility is the Gersten Pavilion. Former Los Angeles Angels of Anaheim pitcher C. J. Wilson attended and pitched at Loyola Marymount in 2001. LMU Softball holds many records. It owns more titles than any other PCSC (Pacific Coast Softball Conference) team, with three in 2003, 2005, and 2007. In 2007, Tiffany Pagano and LMU beat UCLA 4–2 in the Los Angeles regional in the NCAA Tournament, to mark their first win over the Bruins, and the first time that UCLA had not won a regional and advanced to the Women's College World Series.

In January 2024, Loyola Marymount announced that it would cut six athletic programs after the 2023–24 season: men's cross-country, men's rowing, men's track and field, women's rowing, women's swimming, and women's track and field.

== Student government ==
ASLMU, The Associated Students of Loyola Marymount University, functions as the student government. It is composed of an Executive Branch, composed of the Management Team and Cabinet Departments; a Legislative Branch, composed of the Senate; and a Judicial Branch, composed of the Judicial Committee. The only elected positions are those of the President, Vice President and the Senate. Unlike the senators, the President and Vice President have a limited term of two years.

== Student media ==
=== The Los Angeles Loyolan ===
The Los Angeles Loyolan newspaper has been published for over 100 years. In August 2013, the student staff of the Loyolan took the publication to a digital-focused format. This gradual shift continued until 2020, when publication shifted to being completely digital, with a focus on multimedia content.

The paper is supported by its advertising department, which has historically paid from 80% to 100% of the cost of publication. Its regular sections include News, Opinion, Sports, Life+Arts and the parody section, named The Bluff after LMU's distinctive landmark. In addition to the content-based sections, the Loyolan houses a variety of multimedia departments, including staples like Photo and Cartoon teams, but in later years branching out to include Video, Audio and Audience Engagement departments.

=== The Tower Yearbook ===
Over the years, the Loyola University Los Angeles yearbook was known by several titles, including the Lair Annual. After the merger the university began publishing the annual The Tower Yearbook which is financed through a mandatory annual student yearbook fee (collected along with tuition).

In 2016, the National Scholastic Press Association awarded the Tower yearbook the Pacemaker Award. SEEK, the winning issue was headed by Mali McGuire the editor-in-chief for the year. The 2015–16 yearbook was also awarded the Gold Crown by the Columbia Scholastic Press Association.

In 2024 at Associated College Press Best of Show Awards, the Tower Yearbook won first prize for Yearbook Design and third prize for Best Yearbook.

=== ROAR Studios ===
ROAR Studios is the newest student media on-campus. It provides a forum for student produced programming to be broadcast, previously via the on-campus cable TV system and now entirely online.

== Service organizations ==
=== Center for Service and Action ===
CSA also oversees LMU's student service organizations. The ten service organizations work to help the university and surrounding community of Los Angeles. The members of these organizations make themselves available for on-campus service as well as on-going commitments to serve at specific non-profit agencies in Southern California. Each organization has a moderator and a chaplain.

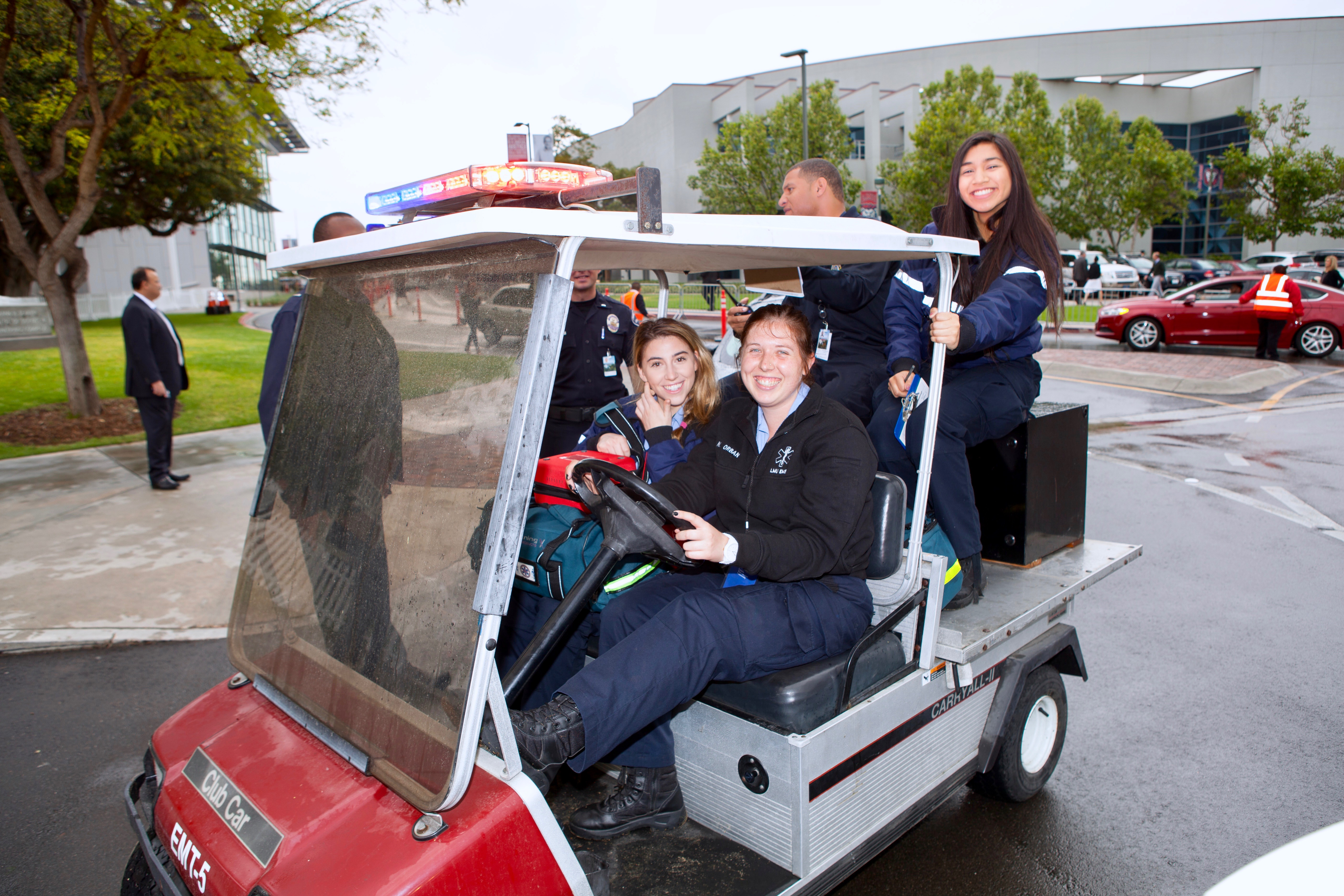
LMU EMTs in a golf cart working Graduation 2016

=== Emergency Medical Services ===
LMU EMS is the on-campus emergency medical services program, consisting of volunteer full-time undergraduate students who are nationally certified EMTs. The organization is 1 of 27 active members of the National Collegiate Emergency Medical Services Foundation (NCEMSF) and the first collegiate EMS group on the West Coast, founded in 1986. LMU EMS responds to between 300 and 500 medical calls on the LMU Westchester campus during the academic year, whenever the campus health clinic is closed, which establishes 24/7 medical coverage of the campus during the school year, serving more than 10,000 work hours annually. As a non-transporting agency, LMU EMS works with the Los Angeles Fire Department for transportation of patients to local emergency departments. LMU EMS was honored as the smallest school to win NCEMSF's Organization of the Year award and Debbie Wilson, the program's founder, was also the first woman to win NCEMSF's Collegiate EMS Advisor of the Year award. The program has also won nine university-wide awards, and four national awards.

== Fraternities and sororities ==
The sorority and fraternity community at Loyola Marymount University consists of 20 chapters – 10 sororities and 10 fraternities. More than 1,500 students (25 percent of the total campus population) are reported to be involved in the Greek community.

== Alumni ==
Loyola Marymount University faculty and alumni include CEOs of Fortune 500 companies, U.S. Governors, members of the United States Congress, Olympic gold medal winners, athletes in the NBA, MLB, NFL and MLS, Academy Award Winners, Emmy Award Winners, Golden Globe Award Winners, Grammy Award Winners, a Pulitzer Prize Winner and a Nobel Prize Winner.

== See also ==
- List of Catholic universities and colleges in the United States
- List of Jesuit sites
