= Francis Lawrence =

American filmmaker (born 1971)

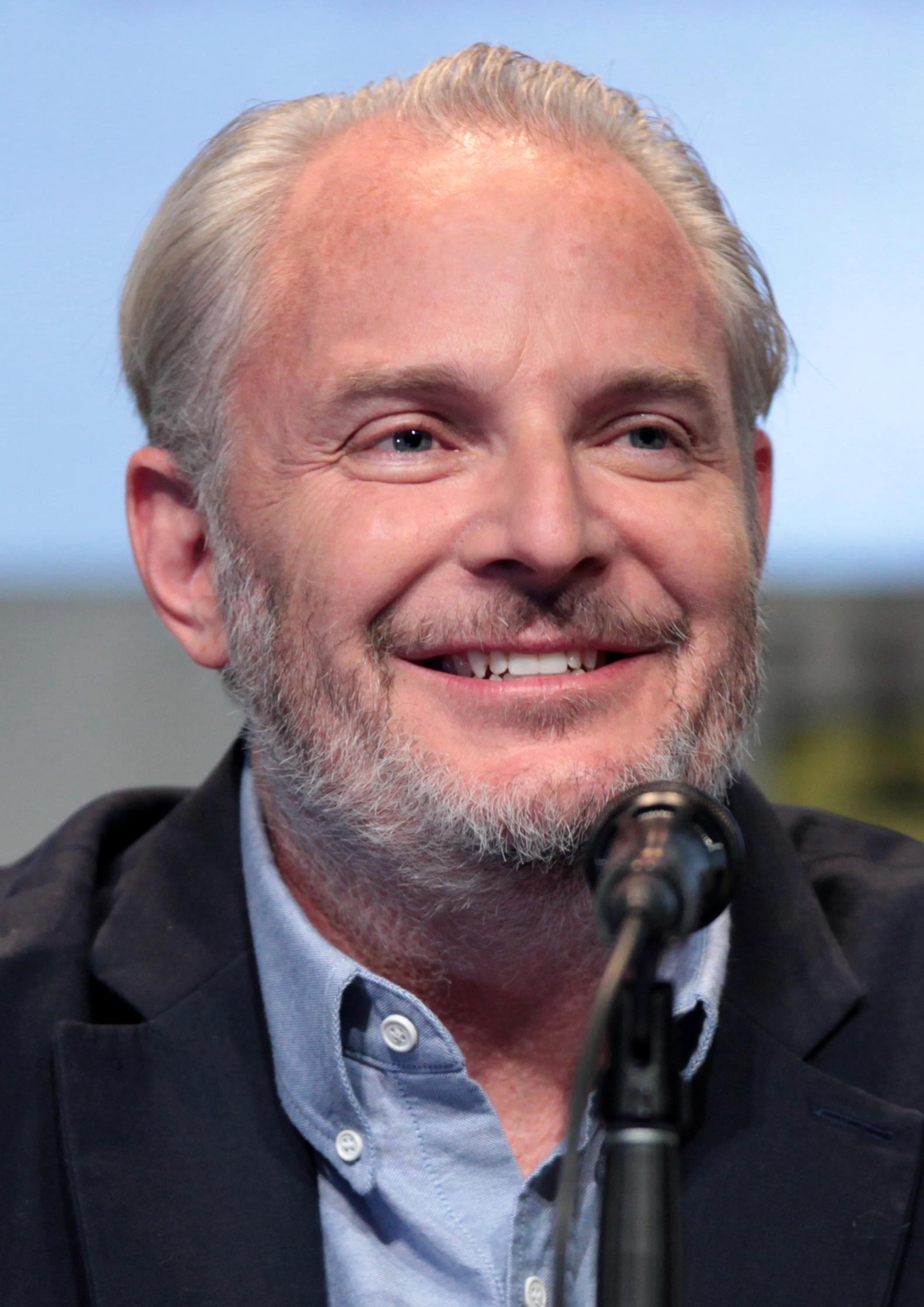
- Lawrence at the 2015 San Diego Comic-Con
- Born: March 26, 1971 (age 55); Vienna, Austria
- Citizenship: United States
- Education: Loyola Marymount University
- Occupations: Film director; film producer
- Years active: 1993–present
- Works: Full list

Francis Lawrence (born March 26, 1971) is an American filmmaker and producer. After establishing himself as a director of music videos and commercials, Lawrence made his feature-length directorial debut with the superhero thriller Constantine (2005) and has since directed the post-apocalyptic horror film I Am Legend (2007), the romantic drama Water for Elephants (2011), the dystopian science fiction adventure series The Hunger Games (2013–present), the spy thriller Red Sparrow (2018), and the dystopian horror drama The Long Walk (2025).

== Early life ==
Lawrence was born to American parents in Vienna, Austria. His father was a theoretical physicist who taught at California State University, Northridge, and his mother is a vice president of technology at a public-relations agency based in his hometown.

He moved to Los Angeles at the age of four. Lawrence worked as second assistant camera on the feature Pump Up the Volume directed by Allan Moyle prior to earning his bachelor's degree in film production at Loyola Marymount University Film School.

== Career ==
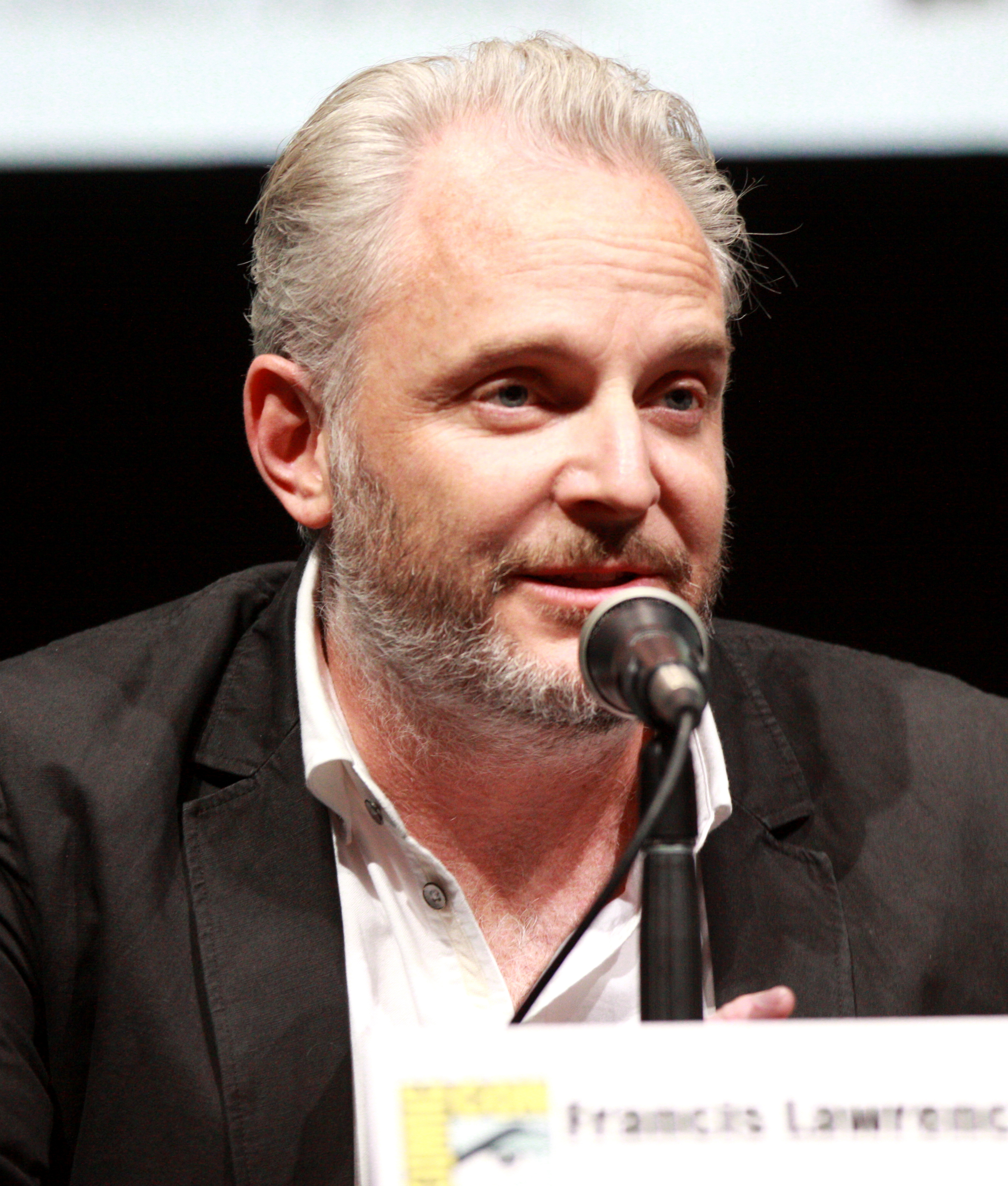
Lawrence at the 2013 San Diego Comic-Con

He went on to work as first assistant director on the feature Marching Out of Time directed by Anton Vassil in 1993. Lawrence then joined ex-classmate Michael Jason Rosen in co-directing music videos. Lawrence directed his first music videos for the San Jose band A Western Front. Rosen and Lawrence made the two videos for a total of $3,000 with Jeffrey Michael Cutter, another ex-classmate, shooting for them. Lawrence, Rosen, and Cutter also made a video for Michael Blakey, president of Atico Records and Tidal Force drummer, for that band's single, "A Man Rides Through". Soon, Lawrence became known for his original and imaginative music video scripts and visual directing style.

He eventually joined a major new production company and his successful career as music video director includes having worked with stars Rihanna, Green Day, Britney Spears, Black Eyed Peas, Jay-Z, Melanie C, Avril Lavigne, Aerosmith, Janet Jackson, Jennifer Lopez, Lady Gaga, Fastball, Lisa Marie Presley, Destiny's Child, Garbage, Goo Goo Dolls, Gwen Stefani, Shakira, Pink, Nelly Furtado, En Vogue, Monica, Missy Elliott, Justin Timberlake, and the Backstreet Boys. In 2002, he won a Latin Grammy Award for Best Short Music Video for directing Shakira's "Suerte" music video. He has also directed numerous commercials for clients such as Coca-Cola, L'Oréal, Calvin Klein, Pepsi-Cola, Maybelline, Kid's Footlocker, Bacardi, McDonald's, GAP, Bud Light, CoverGirl, Oldsmobile, and Disneyland. In 2005, his feature-film debut was Constantine, based on the Hellblazer comic book, starring Keanu Reeves.

In 2007, he directed I Am Legend (based on the Richard Matheson novel), with Will Smith. In 2011, he directed Water for Elephants. In 2012, Lawrence directed and executive produced the pilot episode of the Fox paranormal series Touch. He is currently signed to DNA Inc. In 2011, he won a Grammy Award for Best Music Video, Short Form for directing Lady Gaga's "Bad Romance" music video.

In April 2012, Lionsgate announced that Lawrence had been selected to direct the film adaptation of the novel Catching Fire. The book and film were the sequel to the blockbuster hit The Hunger Games, starring Jennifer Lawrence (no relation). This film adaptation of The Hunger Games was directed by Gary Ross, and both novels were written by Suzanne Collins. Lawrence was officially confirmed as the director for the film on May 3, 2012.

He returned to direct the two final parts of the series, The Hunger Games: Mockingjay – Part 1 (2014) and Part 2 (2015). Lawrence is currently working on a film adaptation of the novel Survivor by Chuck Palahniuk.

Lawrence directed Red Sparrow, based on the novel of the same name by Jason Matthews, and featuring The Hunger Games star Jennifer Lawrence and Joel Edgerton. The film was released on March 2, 2018.

Lawrence signed on to direct The Ballad of Songbirds and Snakes, an adaptation of the Hunger Games prequel novel by original author Suzanne Collins, in April 2020. The film was released on November 17, 2023.

In March 2021, his about:blank production company struck a deal with New Republic Pictures. Their first project together will be an adaptation of the Philip K. Dick novel Vulcan's Hammer, announced in November 2021. In March 2022, it was announced that Lawrence would be directing a feature adaptation of Kevin J. Anderson and Steven L. Sears’ Stalag-X, to be written by Joy Wilkinson. In April 2022, it was announced that Lawrence will be one of the executive producers of Chief of War for Apple TV+.

In August 2022, TheWrap reported that Lawrence had signed with Netflix to direct an adaptation of BioShock, inspired by the 2K Games franchise. In September of the same year, Deadline reported that the director would also be returning to direct a sequel to Constantine.

In November 2023, it was announced that Lawrence would direct and produce The Long Walk for Lionsgate, based on the novel by Stephen King and published under the pseudonym "Richard Bachman". Production began in Manitoba in July 2024, with Cooper Hoffman, David Jonsson, Charlie Plummer, and Roman Griffin Davis among the cast. Most recently, the company had signed a first-look deal with Lionsgate to produce projects.

In 2026, he directed The Hunger Games: Sunrise on the Reaping, the second prequel film in The Hunger Games series, starring Joseph Zada as the younger version of Woody Harrelson's character Haymitch during the 50th Hunger Games.

On October 16th 2026, it was announced that Lawrence would direct the film adaptation for the novel Red Rising by Pierce Brown for Paramount Pictures. No release date or cast has been announced.

== Filmography ==
Year	Title	Distributor
2005	Constantine	Warner Bros. Pictures
2007	I Am Legend	Warner Bros. Pictures
2011	Water for Elephants	20th Century Fox
2013	The Hunger Games: Catching Fire	Lionsgate
2014	The Hunger Games: Mockingjay – Part 1	Lionsgate
2015	The Hunger Games: Mockingjay – Part 2	Lionsgate
2018	Red Sparrow	20th Century Fox
2022	Slumberland	Netflix
2023	The Hunger Games: The Ballad of Songbirds & Snakes	Lionsgate
2025	The Long Walk	Lionsgate
2026	The Hunger Games: Sunrise on the Reaping	Lionsgate
