= List of horror films of 2021 =

This is a list of horror films that were released in 2021. This list includes films that are classified as horror as well as other subgenres. They are listed in alphabetical order.

== Highest-grossing horror films of 2021 ==
Highest-grossing horror films of 2021
Rank	Title	Distributor	Worldwide gross
1	The Conjuring: The Devil Made Me Do It	Warner Bros. Pictures	$206.4 million
2	The Black Phone	Universal Pictures	$161.4 million
3	Halloween Kills	Universal Pictures	$133.4 million
4	The Addams Family 2	Universal Pictures	$119.8 million
5	Old	Universal Pictures	$90.2 million
6	Candyman	Universal Pictures	$77.4 million
7	The Forever Purge	Universal Pictures	$77 million
8	Escape Room: Tournament of Champions	Sony Pictures Releasing	$65.8 million
9	Don't Breathe 2	Sony Pictures Releasing	$53.8 million
10	Resident Evil: Welcome to Raccoon City	Screen Gems / Sony Pictures Releasing / Metropolitan Filmexport / Constantin Film	$42 million

== 2021 horror films ==
Horror films released in 2021
Title	Director	Cast	Country	Genre	Ref.
616 Wilford Lane	Mark S. Allen, Dante Yore	John Littlefield, Eric Roberts, Alyson Gorske, Jessica Chancellor	United States	Horror	
A Banquet	Ruth Paxton	Sienna Guillory, Jessica Alexander, Ruby Stokes	United Kingdom	Horror	
A Classic Horror Story	Roberto De Feo, Paolo Strippoli	Matilda Lutz, Francesco Russo, Peppino Mazzotta, William Merrick, Yuliia Sobol	Italy	Horror	
A House on the Bayou	Alex McAulay	Paul Schneider, Angela Sarafyan, Jacob Lofland, Lia McHugh, Doug Van Liew, Lauren Richards	United States	Horror	
Affliction	Teddy Soeriaatmadja	Raihaanun, Tutie Kirana, Ibnu Jamil, Abiyyu Barakbah	Indonesia	Horror	
Aftermath	Peter Winther	Ashley Greene, Shawn Ashmore	United States	Horror	
Agnes	Mickey Reece	Hayley McFarland, Molly Quinn, Sean Gunn, Chris Browning, Rachel True, Chris Sullivan	United States	Horror Drama	
American Refugee	Ali LeRoi	Erika Alexander, Derek Luke, Sam Trammell	United States	Horror Thriller	
Antlers	Scott Cooper	Keri Russell, Jesse Plemons, Graham Greene, Scott Haze, Rory Cochrane, Amy Madigan	United States	Supernatural horror	
Ape vs. Monster	Daniel Lusko	Eric Roberts	United States	Science Fiction Monster Mockbuster	
Aquarium of the Dead	Glenn Miller	Vivica A. Fox, Eva Ceja, D. C. Douglas	United States	Comedy horror	
Army of the Dead	Zack Snyder	Dave Bautista, Ella Purnell, Ana de la Reguera	United States	Zombie, Heist	
Baby Doll	Manfe Lozial	Samantha Ciravolo, Ortensia Fioravanti, Mauro Loverre, Marco Paolini	Italy	Horror Comedy	
Batman: The Long Halloween	Chris Palmer	Jensen Ackles, Josh Duhamel, Naya Rivera	United States	Two-Part Crime Horror Superhero	
Bingo Hell	Gigi Saul Guerrero	Adriana Barraza, L. Scott Caldwell, Joshua Caleb Johnson	United States	Horror Comedy	
Bhoot Bangla	Furqaan Adam	Saba Faisal, Agha Ali, Sumbul Iqbal, Maira Khan	Pakistan	Comedy horror	
Biyernes Santo	Pedring Lopez	Ella Cruz	Philippines	Horror	
Black as Night	Maritte Lee Go	Asjha Cooper, Frabizio Guido, Mason Beauchamp, Abbie Gayle, Craig Tate, Keith David	United States	Horror	
Black Friday	Casey Tebo	Devon Sawa, Ivana Baquero, Ryan Lee, Stephen Peck, Michael Jai White, Bruce Campbell	United States	Horror Comedy	
Blood Conscious	Timothy Covell	Oghenero Gbaje, DeShawn White, Lenny Thomas, Lori Hammel	United States	Horror Slasher	
Blood Red Sky	Peter Thorwarth	Peri Baumeister, Roland Møller, Chidi Ajufo, Alexander Scheer	Germany	Action Horror Thriller	
Burial Ground Massacre	Daniel Dahlstrom, David Gere	Michael Madsen, Chelsea Vale, Vinny Marseglia, Travis Gordon	United States	Horror	
Camp Love	Melisa Sandlin	Connie Kincer, Brian Boynton, Aaron Noble, Haley Heslip	United States	Horror	
Candyman	Nia DaCosta	Yahya Abdul-Mateen II, Teyonah Parris, Nathan Stewart-Jarrett, Colman Domingo	United States	Supernatural slasher	
Censor	Prano Bailey-Bond	Niamh Algar, Nicholas Burns, Vincent Franklin, Sophia La Porta, Adrian Schiller, Michael Smiley	United Kingdom	psychological horror	
Coming Home in the Dark	James Ashcroft	Daniel Gillies, Erik Thomson, Miriama McDowell, Matthias Luafutu	New Zealand	Psychological Crime Thriller	
Continuance	Tony Olmos	Tony Gorodeckas, Noor Razooky, Teresa Suarez Grosso, Brian Patrick Butler, Kayla Schaffroth, Kelly Potts, Mark Atkinson	United States	Comedy horror	
Cube	Yasuhiko Shimizu	Masaki Suda, Anne Watanabe, Masaki Okada, Hikaru Tashiro, Takumi Saito, Kōtarō Yoshida	Japan	Science fiction Horror	
Dashcam	Rob Savage	Annie Hardy, Amer Chadha-Patel, Angela Enahoro	United States, United Kingdom	Computer screen Horror	
Dawn of the Beast	Bruce Wemple	Francesca Anderson, Adrián Burke, Chris Cimperman, Ariella Mastroianni, Roger Mayer, Anna Shields	United States	Horror	
Death Valley	Matthew Ninaber	Jeremy Ninaber, Ethan Mitchell, Kristen Kaster, Matthew Ninaber	Canada	Horror, Science Fiction	
Demigod	Miles Doleac	Sherri Eakin, Sarah S. Fisher, Lindsay Anne Williams, Elena Sanchez	United States	Horror	
Demonic	Neill Blomkamp	Carly Pope, Chris William Martin, Michael Rogers, Nathalie Boltt, Terry Chen, Kandyse McClure	United States	Supernatural Horror	
Don't Breathe 2	Rodo Sayagues	Stephen Lang, Brendan Sexton III, Madelyn Grace	United States	Horror Thriller	
Don't Say Its Name	Rueben Martell	Sera-Lys McArthur, Madison Walsh, Julian Black Antelope, Samuel Marty	Canada	Horror	
Dreamcatcher	Jacob Johnson	Niki Koss, Zachary Gordon, Travis Burns, Emrhys Cooper	United States	Horror Slasher	
Dwellers	Drew Fortier	Drew Fortier, James L. Edwards, Douglas Esper, David Ellefson	United States	Found footage	
Ego	Alfonso Cortés-Cavanillas	María Pedraza, Marian Álvarez, Pol Monen, Alicia Borrachero	Spain	Horror thriller	
Escape Room: Tournament of Champions	Adam Robitel	Taylor Russell, Logan Miller, Deborah Ann Woll, Indya Moore, Holland Roden, Thomas Cocquerel, Carlito Olivero	United States	Survival Horror	
Ex	Evgeniy Puzyrevskiy	Konstantin Beloshapka, Sergey Dvoynikov, Pavel Golubev, Vera Kincheva	Russia	Mystery Horror Drama	
False Positive	John Lee	Ilana Glazer, Justin Theroux, Pierce Brosnan	United States	Horror	
Fear of Rain	Castille Landon	Katherine Heigl, Madison Iseman, Israel Broussard, Eugenie Bondurant, Harry Connick Jr.	United States	psychological thriller	
Fear Street Part One: 1994	Leigh Janiak	Kiana Madeira, Olivia Scott Welch, Benjamin Flores Jr.	United States	Slasher	
Fear Street Part Two: 1978	Leigh Janiak	Sadie Sink, Emily Rudd, Ryan Simpkins	United States	Teen slasher	
Fear Street Part Three: 1666	Leigh Janiak	Kiana Madeira, Ashley Zukerman, Gillian Jacobs, Olivia Scott Welsh	United States	Supernatural horror	
Fever Dream	Claudia Llosa	María Valverde, Dolores Fonzi	Chile, Peru, Spain, United States	Psychological Horror	
Gaia	Jaco Bouwer	Monique Rockman, Carel Nel, Alex van Dyk, Anthony Oseyemi	South Africa	Horror Drama	
Ghost Lab	Paween Purijitpanya	Thanapob Leeratanakachorn, Paris Intarakomalyasut, Nuttanicha Dungwattanawanich	Thailand	Drama Horror Thriller	
Ghosts of the Ozarks	Matt Glass, Jordan Wayne Long	Thomas Hobson, Tara Perry, Phil Morris, Angela Bettis, Erick Rowan, Tim Blake Nelson, David Arquette	United States	Independent Science fiction Mystery	
Great White	Martin Wilson	Katrina Bowden, Aaron Jakubenko, Tim Kano, Te Kohe Tuhaka, Kimie Tsukakoshi	Australia	Survival Horror	
Guimoon: The Lightless Door	Sim Deok-Geun	Kim Kang-woo, Kim So-hye, Lee Jung-hyung	South Korea	Horror	
Halloween Kills	David Gordon Green	Jamie Lee Curtis, Judy Greer, Andi Matichak, Will Patton, Thomas Mann, Anthony Michael Hall, Kyle Richards	United States	Slasher horror	
Howling Village	Takashi Shimizu	Ayaka Miyoshi, Ryôta Bandô, Tsuyoshi Furukawa	Japan	Horror	
Huwag Kang Lalabas	Adolfo Alix Jr.	Kim Chiu, Aiko Melendez, Beauty Gonzalez	Philippines	Horror Anthology	
Hypnotic	Matt Angel, Suzanne Coote	Kate Siegel, Jason O'Mara, Dulé Hill	United States	Thriller	
In the Earth	Ben Wheatley	Joel Fry, Reece Shearsmith, Hayley Squires, Ellora Torchia, John Hollingsworth, Mark Monero	United Kingdom, United States	Science Fiction Psychological Horror	
Jakob's Wife	Travis Stevens	Barbara Crampton, Larry Fessenden, Bonnie Aarons	United States	Vampire Horror	
Kicking Blood	Blaine Thurier	Alanna Bale, Luke Bilyk, Benjamin Sutherland	Canada	Vampire Horror Comedy	
Lamb	Valdimar Jóhannsson	Noomi Rapace, Hilmir Snær Guðnason, Björn Hlynur Haraldsson, Ingvar Eggert Sigurðsson	Iceland, Sweden, Poland	folk horror	
Last Night in Soho	Edgar Wright	Thomasin McKenzie, Anya Taylor-Joy, Matt Smith, Rita Tushingham, Michael Ajao, Terence Stamp, Diana Rigg	United States, United Kingdom	Psychological horror	
Let the Wrong One In	Conor McMahon	Karl Rice, Eoin Duffy, Hilda Fay, Lisa Haskins, Anthony Head	Ireland	Horror Comedy	
Let Us In	Craig Moss	Makenzie Moss, Sadie Stanley, Mackenzie Ziegler, O'Neill Monahan, Siena Agudong, Tobin Bell	United States	Family Science fiction Horror	
Mad God	Phil Tippett	Alex Cox, Niketa Roman, Hans Brekke, Chris Morley	United States	Stop motion adult animated Experimental Horror	
Madres	Ryan Zaragoza	Ariana Guerra, Tenoch Huerta, Elpidia Carrillo, Kerry Cahill, Jennifer Patino, Britton Webb, Evelyn Gonzalez	United States	Horror	
Malignant	James Wan	Annabelle Wallis, George Young, Maddie Hasson, Michole Briana White, Jacqueline McKenzie	United States	Horror	
Martyrs Lane	Ruth Platt	Denise Gough, Steven Cree, Anastasia Hille, Hannah Rae, Kiera Thompson	United Kingdom	Horror	
Megaboa	Mario N. Bonassin	Eric Roberts, Michelle Elizabeth O'Shea, Emilia Torello, Joe Herrera	United States	Action Horror	
Monster Family 2	Holger Tappe	Emily Watson, Jason Isaacs, Nick Frost, Jessica Brown Findlay, Catherine Tate, Ethan Rouse, Emily Carey	Germany, United Kingdom	Animated Comedy horror	
Nelia	Lester Dimaranan	Winwyn Marquez, Raymond Bagatsing, Ali Forbes	Philippines	Suspense thriller	
Night at the Eagle Inn	Erik Bloomquist	Amelia Dudley, Taylor Turner, Greg Schweers, Beau Minniear, Erik Bloomquist	United States	Indie Horror Thriller	
Night of the Animated Dead	Jason Axinn	Josh Duhamel, Dulé Hill, Katharine Isabelle, James Roday Rodriguez, Katee Sackhoff, Will Sasso, Jimmi Simpson, Nancy Travis	United States	Adult animation zombie horror	
Nightbooks	David Yarovesky	Winslow Fegley, Lidya Jewett, Krysten Ritter	United States	Dark Fantasy	
No One Gets Out Alive	Santiago Menghini	Cristina Rodlo, Marc Menchaca	United Kingdom	Horror	
Nobody Sleeps in the Woods Tonight Part 2	Bartosz M. Kowalski	Zofia Wichłacz, Julia Wieniawa, Wojciech Mecwaldowski, Mateusz Wieclawek, Andrzej Grabowski	Poland	Supernatural Horror Slasher	
Old	M. Night Shyamalan	Gael García Bernal, Vicky Krieps, Rufus Sewell, Alex Wolff, Thomasin McKenzie, Abbey Lee, Nikki Amuka-Bird, Ken Leung, Eliza Scanlen, Aaron Pierre, Embeth Davidtz, Emun Elliott	United States	Horror Thriller	
Paranormal Activity: Next of Kin	William Eubank	Emily Bader, Roland Buck III, Dan Lippert, Henry Ayers-Brown	United States	Found footage, supernatural horror	
Pretty Boy	Marcel Walz	Sarah French, Jed Rowen, Devanny Pinn, Heather Grace Hancock	United States	Horror	
Prisoners of the Ghostland	Sion Sono	Nicolas Cage, Sofia Boutella, Bill Moseley	United States	Horror Western	
Rabid	Erik Matti	Vance Larena, Ricci Rivero, Donna Cariaga, Chesca Diaz, Jake Macapagal, Ameera Johara, Ayeesha Cervantes	Philippines	Horror	
Resident Evil: Welcome to Raccoon City	Johannes Roberts	Kaya Scodelario, Robbie Amell, Hannah John-Kamen, Avan Jogia	United States, Germany, Canada	Zombie, Action Horror	
The Retaliators	Samuel Gonzalez Jr., Bridget Smith	Michael Lombardi, Marc Menchaca, Joseph Gatt, Katie Kelly, Jacoby Shaddix, Zoltan Bathory, Ivan Moody, Spencer Charnas	United States	Action Horror	
Room 9	Thomas Walton	Kane Hodder, Michael Berryman, Scout Taylor-Compton, Brian Anthony Wilson	United States	Drama Horror	
Row 19	Alexander Babaev	Svetlana Ivanova, Wolfgang Cerny, Anna Glaube, Viktoriya Korlyakova, Ekaterina Vilkova	Russia	Horror	
Seance	Simon Barrett	Suki Waterhouse, Madisen Beaty, Ella-Rae Smith, Inanna Sarkis	United States	Supernatural Horror	
Separation	William Brent Bell	Rupert Friend, Mamie Gummer, Madeline Brewer, Violet McGraw, Simon Quarterman, Brian Cox	United States	Supernatural Horror	
Shepherd	Russell Owen	Tom Hughes, Kate Dickie, Greta Scacchi, Gaia Weiss, Jamie Marie Leary	United Kingdom	Horror Mystery	
Sister Krampus	Anthony Polonia, Mark Polonia	Rebecca Rinehart, Marie DeLorenzo, Danielle Donahue	United States	Horror Drama Action	
Slapface	Jeremiah Kipp	August Maturo, Mike Manning, Libe Barer, Dan Hedaya	United States	Independent film, Horror film	
Slumber Party Massacre	Danishka Esterhazy	Hannah Gonera, Alex McGregor, Schelaine Bennett, Mila Rayne, Rob van Vuuren	South Africa, United States	Slasher	
Son	Ivan Kavanagh	Andi Matichak, Emile Hirsch, Luke David Blumm	Ireland	Supernatural thriller	
Sound of Violence	Alex Noyer	Jasmin Savoy Brown, Lili Simmons, James Jagger	Finland, United States	Slasher	
Spiral: From the Book of Saw	Darren Lynn Bousman	Chris Rock, Samuel L. Jackson	United States	Horror, Thriller	
Suicide Forest Village	Takashi Shimizu	Yumi Adachi, Hideko Hara, Fūju Kamio, Haruka kudo	Japan	Drama Horror Mystery	
The 8th Night	Kim Tae-hyoung	Lee Sung-min, Park Hae-joon, Kim Yoo-jung, Nam Da-reum	South Korea	mystery thriller	
The Accursed	Kathryn Michelle, Elizabeta Vidovic	Yancy Butler, Izabela Vidovic, George H. Xanthis	United States	Supernatural horror	
The Addams Family 2	Greg Tiernan	Oscar Isaac, Charlize Theron, Chloë Grace Moretz, Nick Kroll, Javon Walton, Bette Midler	Canada, United States	Animated Supernatural horror black comedy	
The Advent Calendar	Patrick Ridremont	Eugénie Derouand, Honorine Magnier, Clément Olivieri, Janis Abrikh	Belgium, France	Horror, Thriller	
The Amityville Moon	Thomas J. Churchill	Cody Renee Cameron, Michael Cervantes, Sheri Davis	United States	Horror Thriller	
The Believer	Shan Serafin	Aidan Bristow, Sophie Kargman, Susan Wilder, Lindsay Ginter, Robbie Goldstein, Billy Zane	United States	Horror	
The Beta Test	Jim Cummings, PJ McCabe	Jim Cummings, PJ McCabe, Virginia Newcomb, Jessie Barr	United States, United Kingdom	Dark Comedy Thriller	
The Black Phone	Scott Derrickson	Mason Thames, Madeleine McGraw, Jeremy Davies, James Ransone, Ethan Hawke	United States	Supernatural Horror	
The Changed	Michael Mongillo	Tony Todd, Jason Alan Smith, Clare Foley, Kathy Searle	United States	Science fiction Thriller	
The Conjuring: The Devil Made Me Do It	Michael Chaves	Vera Farmiga, Patrick Wilson, Ruairi O'Connor, Sarah Catherine Hook, Julian Hilliard	United States	Supernatural horror	
The Cursed	Sean Ellis	Boyd Holbrook, Kelly Reilly, Alistair Petrie, Roxane Duran	United States, France	Gothic Horror	
The Deep House	Julien Maury and Alexandre Bustillo	James Jagger, Camille Rowe	France	Supernatural Horror	
The Djinn	David Charbonier, Justin Powell	Ezra Dewey, Tevy Poe, Rob Brownstein, John Erickson	United States	Supernatural Horror	
The Exorcism of God	Alejandro Hidalgo	Will Beinbrink, María Gabriela de Faría, Joseph Marcell	United States, Mexico	supernatural horror	
The Exorsis	Fifth Solomon	Alex Gonzaga, Toni Gonzaga	Philippines	Horror Comedy	
The Feast	Lee Haven Jones	Annes Elwy, Nia Roberts, Julian Lewis Jones	United Kingdom	Folk horror	
The Forever Purge	Everardo Gout	Ana de la Reguera, Josh Lucas, Tenoch Huerta, Leven Rambin, Will Patton, Cassidy Freeman	United States	Dystopian, Action horror	
The Girl Who Got Away	Michael Morrissey	Kaye Tuckerman, Timothy J. Alex, Beau Berman, Aubin Bradley	United States	Horror Thriller	
The Grandmother	Paco Plaza	Almudena Amor, Vera Valdez	Spain, France	Elderly-themed horror	
The Herald and The Horror	Jayvee Kang Margaja	Tere Gonzales, Vic Tiro, Odette Leyba, Babes Bunag, Rico Equiron	Philippines	Horror	
The Innocents	Eskil Vogt	Rakel Lenora Fløttum, Alva Brynsmo Ramstad, Sam Ashraf, Mina Yasmin Bremseth Asheim, Ellen Dorrit Petersen	Norway	Supernatural Thriller	
The Last Rite	Leroy Kincaide	Bethan Waller, Johnny Fleming, Kit Smith, Tara Hoyos-Martinez	United Kingdom	Supernatural horror	
The Last Thing Mary Saw	Edoardo Vitaletti	Isabelle Fuhrman, Stefanie Scott, Judith Roberts, Rory Culkin	United States	Folk horror	
The Manor	Axelle Carolyn	Barbara Hershey, Bruce Davison, Stacey Travis, Ciera Payton, Jill Larson, Mark Steger	United States	Gothic Supernatural horror	
The Medium	Banjong Pisanthanakun	Narilya Gulmongkolpech, Sawanee Utoomma, Sirani Yankittikan, Yasaka Chaisorn, Boonsong Nakphoo	Thailand, South Korea	Mockumentary Supernatural Horror	
The Night House	David Bruckner	Rebecca Hall, Sarah Goldberg, Stacy Martin, Evan Jonigkeit, Vondie Curtis-Hall	United States	Supernatural horror	
The Passenger	Raúl Cerezo Fernando González Gómez	Ramiro Blas, Cecilia Suárez, Cristina Alcázar, and Paula Gallego	Spain	Road movie	
The Possessed	Chris Sun	John Jarratt, Lincoln Lewis, Angie Kent	Australia	Horror	
The Resort	Taylor Chien	Bianca Haase, Brock O'Hurn, Michael Vlamis, and Michelle Randolph	United States	Horror	
The Sadness	Rob Jabbaz	Berant Zhu, Regina	Taiwan	Apocalyptic Body horror	
The Seed	Sam Walker	Lucy Martin, Chelsea Edge, Sophie Vavasseur	United Kingdom	Body horror	
The Seventh Day	Justin P. Lange	Guy Pearce, Vadhir Derbez, Stephen Lang, Keith David	United States	Horror	
The Spine of Night	Philip Gelatt, Morgan Galen King	Richard E. Grant, Lucy Lawless, Patton Oswalt, Betty Gabriel, Joe Manganiello	United States	Adult animated Dark fantasy Horror	
The Spore	Matt Cunningham	Jean Ann Boshoven, Haley Heslip, Peter Tell, Jackson Ezinga	United States	Horror	
The Stairs	Peter 'Drago' Tiemann	Kathleen Quinlan, John Schneider, Russell Hodgkinson	United States	Horror Mystery	
The Unholy	Evan Spiliotopoulos	Jeffrey Dean Morgan, Katie Aselton, William Sadler, Diogo Morgado, Cary Elwes	United States	Supernatural horror	
The Wasteland	David Casademunt	Inma Cuesta, Roberto Álamo, Asier Flores	Spain	Horror Drama	
There's Someone Inside Your House	Patrick Brice	Sydney Park, Theodore Pellerin, Asjha Cooper, Dale Whibley, Jesse LaTourette, Burkely Duffield, Diego Josef, Markian Tarasiuk, Sarah Dugdale	United States	Slasher	
Things Heard & Seen	Shari Springer Berman and Robert Pulcini	James Norton, Amanda Seyfried	United States	Horror	
Till Death	S.K. Dale	Megan Fox, Callan Mulvey, Eoin Macken, Aml Ameen, Jack Roth	United States	Thriller	
Titane	Julia Ducournau	Vincent Lindon, Agathe Rousselle, Garance Marillier, Laïs Salameh	France	Body Horror Psychological Drama	
Untitled Horror Movie	Nick Simon	Claire Holt, Darren Barnet, Emmy Raver-Lampman, Katherine McNamara, Timothy Granaderos	United States	Found Footage Horror Comedy	
V/H/S/94	Jennifer Reeder, Chloe Okuno, Simon Barrett, Timo Tjahjanto, Ryan Prows	Kimmy Choi, Anna Hopkins, Conor Sweeney, Kyal Legend, Shania Sree Maharani, Christian Lloyd	United States	Found Footage Horror Anthology	
Venicephrenia	Álex de la Iglesia	Ingrid García Jonsson, Silvia Alonso, Goize Blanco, Nicolás Illoro, Alberto Bang, Cosimo Fusco, Caterina Murino	Spain	Slasher	
We Need to Do Something	Sean King O'Grady	Sierra McCormick, Vinessa Shaw, Lisette Alexis, Pat Healy, and Ozzy Osbourne	United States	Psychological Horror	
We're All Going to the World's Fair	Jane Schoenbrun	Anna Cobb, Michael Rogers	United States	Coming-of-age Horror	
Werewolves Within	Josh Ruben	Sam Richardson, Michael Chernus, Michaela Watkins, Cheyenne Jackson, Milana Vayntrub, George Basil, Sarah Burns, Catherine Curtin, Wayne Duvall, Harvey Guillén, Rebecca Henderson	United States	Comedy horror	
What Josiah Saw	Vincent Grashaw	Robert Patrick, Nick Stahl, Scott Haze, Kelli Garner, Jake Weber, Tony Hale	United States	Southern Gothic, Psychological horror, Drama	
When I Consume You	Perry Blackshear	Libby Ewing, Evan Dumouchel, MacLeod Andrews, Margaret Ying Drake	United States	Ahab and the Dark	
Willy's Wonderland	Kevin Lewis	Nicolas Cage, Emily Tosta, Beth Grant, David Sheftell, Caylee Cowan	United States	Comedy horror	
Witch Hunt	Elle Callahan	Gideon Adlon, Abigail Cowen, Elizabeth Mitchell, Echo Campbell	United States	Dark fantasy Horror Thriller	
Wrong Turn	Mike P. Nelson	Charlotte Vega, Adain Bradley, Bill Sage, Emma Dumont, Dylan McTee, Daisy Head, Matthew Modine	United States	Horror Slasher	
Yellow Dragon's Village	Yugo Sakamoto	Yuni Akino, Itsuki Fujii, Wataru Ichinose, Wasayuki Inô, Rikiya Kaidô	Japan	Action Drama Horror	
You Are Not My Mother	Kate Dolan	Hazel Doupe, Carolyn Bracken, Jordanne Jones, Paul Reid, Ingrid Craigie, Jade Jordan	Ireland	Psychological horror	
Zombie Reddy	Prasanth Varma	Sajja Teja, Anandhi, Daksha Nagarkar	India	Zombie, Action horror	
Zombitopia	Woo Ming Jin	Shaheizy Sam, Elvina Mohamad, Bront Palarae, Azman Hassan, Sharifah Amani	Malaysia	Zombie Horror Thriller	
