= Fear Street =

Horror fiction series by R. L. Stine

- Author: R. L. Stine
- Country: United States
- Language: English
- Genre: Horror fiction, young adult fiction
- Publisher: Simon Pulse, Golden Books and St. Martin's Press
- Published: 1989–1999; 2005; 2014–present
- Media type: Print (hardcover and paperback)

Fear Street is a teenage horror fiction series written by American author R. L. Stine, starting in 1989. In 1995, a series of books inspired by the Fear Street series, called Ghosts of Fear Street, was created for younger readers, and were more like the Goosebumps books in that they featured paranormal adversaries (monsters, aliens, etc.) and sometimes had twist endings.

R. L. Stine stopped writing Fear Street after penning the Fear Street Seniors spin-off in 1999. In summer 2005, he brought Fear Street back with the three-part Fear Street Nights miniseries.

As of 2010, over 80 million copies of Fear Street have been sold.

R. L. Stine revived the book series in 2014. Film adaptations based on the franchise were released by Netflix between 2021 and 2025.

== Plot summary ==
The Fear Street books take place in the fictionalized town of Shadyside and feature average teenagers older than the typical Goosebumps preteens, who encounter malignant, sometimes paranormal, adversaries. While some of the Fear Street novels have paranormal elements, such as ghosts, others are simply murder mysteries. Whereas the Goosebumps books have a few tamed deaths, the deaths presented in Fear Street, particularly the Sagas, are far more gruesome, with more blood and gore.

The title of the series comes from the name of a fictional street in Shadyside, which was named after the Fear family. Their name was originally spelled as Fier; after being told that the family was cursed and that the letters could be rearranged to spell "fire", Simon Fier changed it to Fear in the 19th century. Despite the family renaming, the curse survived, and Simon and his wife, Angelica, brought it with them when they moved to Shadyside sometime after the Civil War.

The curse started in Puritan (17th-century) times when Benjamin and Matthew Fier sentenced an innocent girl and her mother, Susannah and Martha Goode, to be burned at the stake for allegedly practicing witchcraft. The father and husband, William Goode, put the curse on the Fiers to avenge their deaths, bringing misery and death to the family. Although a fire allegedly burned the last of the Fears, the series features some surviving Fears and suggests that one of the brothers survived. These events are described in the Fear Street Sagas, a spin-off of the main series.

Similar to the Goosebumps series, the characters change in each book, although some characters still live on and are mentioned (or show up) multiple times. Some of the previously released novels' plots are also mentioned in later books, and some characters appear in multiple stories (for instance, Cory Brooks, hero of The New Girl, is mentioned and shows up several times during the later novels). The plot for the books occurs between the late 1980s and early 1990s, although multiple novels occur within the same chronological year.

== Setting ==
The Fear Street series takes place in a town called Shadyside. Much of the paranormal activity, the murders and other unexplained happenings occur either directly on Fear Street, in the woods surrounding the street or on Fear Island which sits in the middle of Fear Lake. Contextual clues in the text suggest Shadyside is either in southern New England or a northern Mid-Atlantic state of the US. For example, in book #3, The Overnight, a character mentions that he goes to BU "up in Boston", suggesting Shadyside is somewhere near Boston, but south of it.

According to descriptions in book #1, The New Girl, the Canononka River runs behind Shadyside Park, which sits behind Shadyside High School. Between the school and the park, multiple books mention a parking lot, alternately referred to as the teacher's lot and the student lot. In book #4, Missing, it is mentioned that the Canononka River marks the edge of town, suggesting that the river makes up some portion of Shadyside's city limit.

The Fear Street woods are situated between Fear Street and the rest of town, although some books suggest the woods are located at the end of the street. When someone walks from Fear Street, straight through the woods, they would end up in another Shadyside neighborhood; people's backyards meet the woods in this neighborhood, but it is very difficult to maintain a straight path, since the woods are so full of undergrowth. Also, there are no birds in the Fear Street woods and the scientists were not able to explain this phenomenon.

Division Street cuts Shadyside into North and South halves; on this street sits the local mall. Division Street crosses Old Mill Road, which then crosses Fear Street, which is in the southern half of town. From this description, it seems reasonable to assume that Fear Street runs at least somewhat parallel to Division Street. The eponymous street is described as winding, with no clear view from end to end. Somewhere on this street sits the burned out shell of Fear Mansion. According to book #5, The Wrong Number, there is a cemetery near the East end of Fear Street, which is also bordered by the Fear Street woods.

At some point in the timeline, between book #1, The New Girl and book #3, The Overnight, the "...ancient collapsing mill built at the end of Old Mill Road before the town of Shadyside even existed, had recently been resurrected and re-opened as a teen dance club called The Mill". Old Mill Road crosses Hawthorne Drive, where there is a small coffee shop called Alma's and is the haunt of many local college kids.

There is a neighborhood called North Hills, which is distinctly different from the rest of Shadyside and has large houses and well tended lawns. It is described as a quiet, peaceful and the nicest neighborhood in Shadyside. Multiple books mention a neighborhood called the Old Village and it seems to be Shadyside's downtown/old town, with multiple businesses.

Waynesbridge is a town about a 20-minute drive from Shadyside. Between the two towns, there is a business park where a company called Cranford Industries makes its home.

== Release ==
The first Fear Street book, The New Girl was published in 1989. Various spin-off series were written, including the Fear Street Sagas and Ghosts of Fear Street. As of 2003, more than 80 million Fear Street books have been sold. Individual books appeared in many bestseller lists, including the USA Today and Publishers Weekly bestseller list.

After a hiatus, R. L. Stine revived the book series in October 2014. Stine had attempted to write a new Fear Street novel for years, but publishers were not interested. Some publishers thought that young adult literature has changed since Fear Street was first published, since the new world of young adult literature is dominated by dystopian worlds and paranormal elements. After Stine told his followers on Twitter that there were no publishers interested in reviving Fear Street, Kat Brzozowski, an editor at St. Martin's Press, contacted him. Initially, the publisher bought three new books, but later expanded to six books.

Party Games, the first book, was first published in September 2014, in hardcover. The novel is Stine's first Fear Street novel since the last book in the Fear Street Nights series was published in 2005. The novel was followed by Don't Stay Up Late, which was published in April 2015. Stine stated that the new books are longer, more adult and more violent, to reflect how young adult literature has changed since Fear Street was first published.

== Adaptations ==
=== Television ===
In 1997, Viacom Productions signed a development deal with Parachute Entertainment to produce a primetime TV series based on the Fear Street and Ghosts of Fear Street series of books for either the 1997-98 or 1998–99 television season to debut during mid-season. Karl Schaefer was appointed as creator and executive producer on the series which would focus on a family living on Fear Street who encounter quirky things in their neighborhood. The series was slated to be a mixture of adapting the books as well as original material with the idea that scripts from the series could be published as books while the books would help fuel interest in the series. Soon after Disney-owned ABC bought a Fear Street pilot. In November of that year, Red Buttons joined the cast as Grandpa and the pilot was slated to start production on November 10 under the direction of Ken Kwapis. The pilot episode for the unproduced Fear Street television series, titled Ghosts of Fear Street, aired on ABC on July 31, 1998. The pilot's airing held 89% of its men 18–34 lead-in but just 55% of its women 18–34 lead-in. The result was ABC's worst rating on record in that slot and a third-place finish for the night in homes and adults 18–49.

=== Film ===
In 1997, Hollywood Pictures struck a deal to acquire the Fear Street series of books, which were set to be developed with Parachute Entertainment as a Scream-like feature franchise.

In 2021, Netflix released a trilogy of films that consist of Fear Street Part One: 1994, Part Two: 1978 and Part Three: 1666. Produced by Chernin Entertainment, the film stars Kiana Madeira, Olivia Scott Welch, and Benjamin Flores Jr. as the lead characters in the trilogy. Additional cast include Ashley Zukerman, Fred Hechinger, Gillian Jacobs, Sadie Sink, Emily Rudd and McCabe Slye. Leigh Janiak directed all three films in the series, after originally being set to direct the first and third films. Alex Ross Perry was previously set to direct the second film. The production is a collaboration between Chernin Entertainment and 20th Century Fox (later 20th Century Studios), who was originally set to distribute the films, before their parting in 2020, resulting in a new distribution deal between Chernin and Netflix. An additional film adaptation based on The Prom Queen was released in 2025.
