= Fear Street Part One: 1994 =

2021 film by Leigh Janiak

- Release poster
- Directed by: Leigh Janiak
- Screenplay by: Phil Graziadei; Leigh Janiak
- Story by: Kyle Killen; Phil Graziadei; Leigh Janiak
- Based on: Fear Street by R. L. Stine
- Produced by: Peter Chernin; Jenno Topping; David Ready
- Starring: Kiana Madeira; Olivia Scott Welch; Benjamin Flores Jr.; Julia Rehwald; Fred Hechinger; Ashley Zukerman; Darrell Britt-Gibson; Maya Hawke
- Cinematography: Caleb Heymann
- Edited by: Rachel Goodlett Katz
- Music by: Marco Beltrami; Marcus Trumpp
- Production company: Chernin Entertainment
- Distributed by: Netflix
- Release dates: June 28, 2021 (Los Angeles); July 2, 2021 (United States)
- Running time: 107 minutes
- Country: United States
- Language: English

Fear Street Part One: 1994 (titled onscreen as Fear Street 1994) is a 2021 American supernatural slasher film directed by Leigh Janiak. The first installment in the Fear Street trilogy, the film was written by Phil Graziadei and Janiak from a story by Kyle Killen, Graziadei, and Janiak, based on the book series of the same name by R. L. Stine. The film follows a teen and her friends after a series of brutal slayings, as they take on an evil force that has plagued their notorious town for centuries. It stars Kiana Madeira, Olivia Scott Welch, Benjamin Flores Jr., Julia Rehwald, Fred Hechinger, Ashley Zukerman, Darrell Britt-Gibson, and Maya Hawke.

Development of a film based on Fear Street began in 1997 when Hollywood Pictures acquired the rights to the series, but the project never materialized. It re-entered development at 20th Century Fox in 2015, with Janiak hired to direct and rewrite Killen's script with Graziadei in 2017. Produced by Chernin Entertainment, filming for the trilogy took place back-to-back from March to September 2019 in Georgia, with the film set for a theatrical release in June 2020. However, the trilogy was pulled from the schedule because of the COVID-19 pandemic. Following the acquisition of 21st Century Fox by Disney, Chernin ended their distribution deal with 20th Century and Netflix subsequently acquired distribution rights in August 2020.

Fear Street Part One: 1994 premiered at the Los Angeles State Historic Park on June 28, 2021, and was released on Netflix on July 2, 2021, with the other entries, Part Two: 1978 and Part Three: 1666, released weekly. The film received generally positive reviews.

== Plot ==
In 1994, Heather, a bookstore employee at the Shadyside Mall, is fatally stabbed by her friend, Ryan Torres. He murders her and six other mall employees before he is shot dead by Sheriff Nick Goode. The media reports the massacre as the norm for Shadyside, which they dub the murder capital of the United States. Meanwhile, the neighboring town of Sunnyvale is its polar opposite, as it is considered one of the richest and safest towns in the country. Many of the Shadyside teenagers believe that this is the result of the witch, Sarah Fier, who placed a curse on the town before being executed for witchcraft in 1666.

Deena Johnson does not believe in the Fier witch and has recently broken up with her closeted girlfriend, Sam, who had moved to Sunnyvale. Josh, her brother, spends his time researching the town's history, and her friends Simon and Kate sell drugs in hopes of eventually leaving the town. Deena and Sam meet again at a vigil in Sunnyvale for the victims of the mall killings, where a brawl between the students of Shadyside and Sunnyvale breaks out. While returning home, Sam's boyfriend, Peter, begins tailgating the bus carrying the Shadyside students, leading Deena to almost throw a large cooler at the car in retaliation. A sudden nosebleed causes her to lose her grip on the cooler, and Peter's car to crash. Sam survives and sees a vision of Sarah Fier before being taken to the hospital.

The following night, Deena and her friends begin being stalked by someone they initially believe is Peter and his friends. However, when Deena and her friends visit Sam, Peter is killed by Skull Mask, who proceeds to murder two others in the hospital and is revealed to be an undead Ryan. Sam and Deena seek help but fail to convince the police, while Simon is attacked by Ruby Lane, one of Shadyside's past killers from 1965. The group realizes that the car accident disturbed Sarah Fier's grave and that Sam bled on her bones, resurrecting several Shadyside killers. Josh deduces that Fier's curse is the reason for Shadyside's history of killings, which began following her execution. They attempt to offer her a proper reburial, but are attacked by the Camp Nightwing Killer. Realizing that the killers only want Sam and are attracted to her blood, they set a trap at school in an attempt to destroy the killers by burning them, but the killers manage to reanimate.

Sam reluctantly agrees to be sacrificed with the group despite Deena's protests. They save her when it is discovered that C. Berman, a survivor of the Camp Nightwing massacre in 1978, claimed to have seen the witch. They attempt to call her but receive no answer. Sam finds out that C. Berman also died, but was resuscitated. The group organizes a plan to kill and revive Sam using drugs from a supermarket pharmacy. There, Kate, Simon, and Josh attempt to fend off the Shadyside killers, but Kate ends up murdered by Skull Mask with a bread slicer and Simon gets an axe to the head by the Camp Nightwing Killer. Deena finally drowns Sam, causing the killers to disappear, and revives her using a combination of EpiPens and CPR.

Afterward, the police decide to place the blame on Simon and Kate, as they were known for selling drugs. Sam and Deena reconcile and publicly come out as a couple. Later that night, while Sam is at her house, Deena receives a call from C. Berman, who tells her that there is no escaping the witch. Sam, now possessed, attacks Deena but is subdued and tied up, with Deena promising to find a way to free her.

== Cast ==
- Kiana Madeira as Deena, a Shadyside teen
- Olivia Scott Welch as Samantha Fraser, Deena's ex-girlfriend
- Benjamin Flores Jr. as Josh, Deena's younger brother.
- Julia Rehwald as Kate, a young Shadysider and Deena's friend
- Fred Hechinger as Simon, a local Shadysider and Deena's friend
- Ashley Zukerman as Nick Goode, Sunnyvale's sheriff
- Darrell Britt-Gibson as Martin, a local Shadysider
- Maya Hawke as Heather, a mall employee
- Jordana Spiro as Mrs. Lane, Ruby Lane's mother
- Jordyn DiNatale as Ruby Lane, a Shadyside teen from the 1960's
- Charlene Amoia as Rachel Thompson, a Sunnyvale customer at the mall
- David W. Thompson as Ryan Torres, an employee at the Shadyside mall
- Jeremy Ford as Peter, Samantha's boyfriend
- Elizabeth Scopel as Sarah Fier, a supposed witch
- Gillian Jacobs as C. Berman, the only survivor of the 1978 Camp Nightwing massacre

== Production ==
In October 1997, Hollywood Pictures struck a deal to acquire the Fear Street series of books, which were set to be developed with Parachute Entertainment as a Scream-like feature franchise. Developments never materialized.

In October 2015, it was announced that a film based on R.L. Stine's Fear Street series was being developed by 20th Century Studios (then known as 20th Century Fox) and Chernin Entertainment. In February 2017, Kyle Killen was hired as screenwriter. In July, the project was announced as a trilogy of films, set in different time periods, with Leigh Janiak, who had previously directed the 2014 horror film Honeymoon, set to direct, as well as rewrite with her partner Phil Graziadei. The Hollywood Reporter stated that the trilogy would be shot back-to-back, with the films released one month apart.

In February 2019, it was reported that Kiana Madeira and Olivia Welch would be starring in the film as lesbian teenagers "trying to navigate their rocky relationship when they're targeted by the crazy horrors of their small town, Shadyside". In March 2019, Benjamin Flores Jr., Ashley Zukerman, Fred Hechinger, Julia Rehwald, and Jeremy Ford joined the cast. In May, Darrell Britt-Gibson was announced as a cast member. Maya Hawke, Jordana Spiro, and Jordyn DiNatale also joined the cast.

In March 2019, filming began in Atlanta and East Point, Georgia. Several vacant storefronts in the North DeKalb Mall in Georgia were renovated so that they could be used for filming. Casual Corner, Software Etc., B. Dalton Bookseller, Musicland, and Gadzooks were placed. Production also took place at Hard Labor Creek State Park in Rutledge in August 2019. Filming wrapped in September 2019.

== Release ==
The film was scheduled to be released theatrically in June 2020, but it was pulled from the schedule because of the COVID-19 pandemic. In April 2020, Chernin Entertainment ended their distribution deal with 20th Century Studios and made a multi-year first-look deal with Netflix. By August 2020, Netflix acquired the distribution rights to the Fear Street trilogy. The film was released on July 2, 2021.

== Reception ==
On the review aggregator website Rotten Tomatoes, the film holds an approval rating of 84% based on 116 reviews, with an average rating of 7/10. The website's critics consensus reads, "Fear Street Part One: 1994 kicks off the trilogy in promising fashion, honoring the source material with plenty of retro slasher appeal." On Metacritic, the film has a weighted average score of 67 out of 100 based on 20 critic reviews, indicating "generally favorable" reviews.

Alison Willmore, writing for Vulture, described the film as "a nasty, effective slasher", and wrote: "Where Get Out or The Babadook used horror to explore the razor-toothed hunger of white liberal (supposed) allies and the terror of feeling unable to trust your own mental state, plenty of other titles end up just pinning themselves to larger concepts in ways that range from clumsily obvious to grossly cynical. But 1994 feels untethered from these obligations." She noted some similarities to the 2014 horror film It Follows, but added: "Janiak's film is saltier, soapier, and more pragmatic—it has sequels to dole out, after all."

Lovia Gyarkye of The Hollywood Reporter wrote: "While it probably won't have you triple checking the locks on your door, it's likely to keep you entertained enough to come back for more", and added: "Even if the conventions are familiar, the film manages to excite thanks to an impressive array of young talent, an appropriately suspenseful score and soundtrack, and a heavy dose of '90s nostalgia." She concluded: "Fear Street Part 1 is fun, and hits its marks with sufficient flair—I'm certainly motivated to see the next two installments—but sometimes the key to subversion is in the details."

A.A. Dowd of The A.V. Club was more critical of the film. In his review, he gave it a grade of C+, describing the killers as being "awfully generic, like the attractions of a slasher parody or one of the more forgettable Halloween knockoffs", and writing: "Slashers used to take a beating for their supposed puritanical politics, but the teens here are as clean and upstanding as they are "likable": A mid-film sex scene in a locker room might be the most wholesome in the history of this disreputable genre". He concluded: "Forget the middle-aged fans it might irk. Don't today's kids deserve some trash of their own, instead of a tasteful substitution?"

Barry Hertz of The Globe and Mail wrote: "while Janiak is able to easily tick off the hallmarks of the genre, and perhaps convince those actually alive in the nineties that the entire decade must have been backlit in aggressive neon, her film doesn't quite scream (or Scream) out for two more films' worth of context", and criticized the film's story. However, he concluded that "given that theatres are still closed in Ontario and I find myself increasingly brain-drained come evening, I'm willing to walk down Janiak's path. Even if Fear Street ends up becoming a dead end."

The film ranks on Rotten Tomatoes' Best Horror Movies of 2021.

== Sequels ==
The trilogy continues with Part Two: 1978 and Part Three: 1666, which were released on July 9, 2021, and July 16, 2021, respectively.
