= Opportunity Knocks =

Opportunity Knocks may refer to:

- Opportunity Knocks (Canadian radio show), a 1947–1957 radio talent show
- Opportunity Knocks (British TV series), a 1949–1990 UK television and radio talent show
- Opportunity Knocks (Australian TV series), a 1976–1978 Australian game show
- Opportunity Knocks (film), a 1990 comedy film
- Opportunity Knocks (2002 TV show), a 2002 US TV show hosted by Dave Coulier and Shaune Bagwell
- Opportunity Knocks (game show), a 2008 US television game show
- "Opportunity Knocks" (George and Mildred), a 1978 television episode
- "Opportunity Knocks" (The Ropers), a 1979 television episode
- "Opportunity Knocks" (My Boys), a 2008 television episode
