= Fear Street Part Three: 1666 =

2021 film by Leigh Janiak

Fear Street: Part Three: 1666
- Release poster
- Directed by: Leigh Janiak
- Screenplay by: Phil Graziadei; Leigh Janiak; Kate Trefry
- Based on: Fear Street by R. L. Stine
- Produced by: Peter Chernin; Jenno Topping; David Ready; Kori Adelson
- Starring: Kiana Madeira; Ashley Zukerman; Gillian Jacobs; Olivia Scott Welch; Benjamin Flores Jr.; Darrell Britt-Gibson
- Cinematography: Caleb Heymann
- Edited by: Rachel Goodlett Katz
- Music by: Marco Beltrami; Anna Drubich
- Production company: Chernin Entertainment
- Distributed by: Netflix
- Release dates: July 14, 2021 (Los Angeles); July 16, 2021 (United States)
- Running time: 114 minutes
- Country: United States
- Language: English
- Budget: $10 million

Fear Street Part Three: 1666 (titled onscreen as Fear Street 1666 for its first half and Fear Street 1994: Part 2 for its second half) is a 2021 American supernatural period horror film directed by Leigh Janiak, who co-wrote the screenplay with Phil Graziadei and Kate Trefry. Based on the book series of the same name by R. L. Stine, it is the third installment of the Fear Street trilogy after Part One: 1994 and Part Two: 1978, and stars Kiana Madeira, Ashley Zukerman, Gillian Jacobs, Olivia Scott Welch, Benjamin Flores Jr., and Darrell Britt-Gibson. The film follows the origins of Shadyside's curse in the mid-17th century and the survivors in 1994 who try to put an end to it.

Produced by Chernin Entertainment, a film adaptation of Fear Street began development at 20th Century Fox in 2015, with Janiak hired in 2017. Filming for the trilogy took place back-to-back from March to September 2019 in Georgia, with the intention of a theatrical release in June 2020. However, due to the COVID-19 pandemic and the acquisition of 21st Century Fox by Disney, Chernin ended their distribution deal with 20th Century and Netflix subsequently acquired distribution rights in August 2020.

Fear Street Part Three: 1666 premiered at the Los Angeles State Historic Park on July 14, 2021, and was released by Netflix on July 16, 2021. It received generally positive reviews from critics. A fourth film, Fear Street: Prom Queen, was released on May 23, 2025.

== Plot ==
=== 1666 ===
After reuniting the severed hand of Sarah Fier with the rest of her corpse, Deena has a vision showing the events of 1666 from the perspective of Sarah Fier. She lives with her father, George Fier, and her younger brother, Henry Fier, in Union, the original settlement before it was divided into Shadyside and Sunnyvale.

One night, Sarah and her friends Hannah Miller and Lizzie meet a reclusive widow to gather potent berries for a party, where Sarah stumbles on a book of black magic. The three then join Isaac and Abigail Berman at the party, where Sarah and Hannah are harassed by Caleb. Sarah and Hannah run off and start kissing, unaware they are being watched by an unknown figure. The next day, the pastor, Cyrus Miller begins acting strangely, and the town's food and water supply have been poisoned. Sarah confides in Solomon Goode about her relationship with Hannah and wonders if she is the one responsible for the town's bad luck. The town then discovers that Cyrus has murdered twelve children in the meeting house, including Abigail's younger sister, Constance Berman and Sarah's brother Henry. Sarah is attacked by Cyrus, but he is killed by Solomon using a pitchfork to stab him. That night, a town meeting is held at which the townspeople decide that witchcraft is the cause of the recent events, and Caleb claims that Sarah and Hannah are the witches responsible. Hannah is captured while Sarah escapes, and the town declares that Hannah will be executed at dawn. Sarah sneaks into the meeting house where Hannah is confined, and the two profess their love. Sarah decides to retrieve the widow's book and use it to make a deal with the Devil to save Hannah, but she discovers that the book is missing and the widow has been murdered. She flees to Solomon's house and hides after he is ambushed by the townspeople that are looking for Sarah. While hiding, she finds tunnels under his house and discovers a ritual and the widow's book. Solomon reveals he took the book to the Devil after the loss of his wife and child, offering Cyrus to be possessed in exchange for power and wealth. He offers to share it with Sarah, but she rejects his offer, and a fight ensues, with Sarah's hand being cut off in the struggle. Sarah escapes to the meeting house only to be captured by Solomon and the townspeople. At her and Hannah's execution, Sarah convinces the town to spare Hannah's life by proclaiming she is the witch and swears vengeance to Solomon before she is hanged. Later, Lizzie, Isaac, Hannah, and Abigail grieve Sarah and properly bury her body.

=== 1994: Part 2 ===
Back in 1994, Deena realises that the Goode family is responsible for the Shadyside curse, as the firstborn of each generation repeats the ritual begun by their pilgrim ancestor Solomon. Because of this, Sunnyvale has always prospered while Shadyside has become worse. Sheriff Nick Goode finds Deena and Josh, but the two escape in Nick's car and arrive at Ziggy's house. The trio deduces they must kill Nick to end the curse. After they recruit the help of Martin, the mall janitor, the group devises a plan to lure Nick to the mall and set traps to have the Shadyside killers murder him. The group manages to trap the killers, and Ziggy pours a bucket of Deena's blood over Nick, causing the killers to attack him. As Nick escapes into the tunnels, Deena and a possessed Sam follow him while the others fight off the killers. Sam attacks Deena, but she breaks Sam out of her possession temporarily before incapacitating her. Nick nearly kills Deena, but she exposes him to the pile of beating organs in the tunnel, which gives him visions of all of the killers' victims, causing him to go into a state of shock as he panics while the visions surround him. As he turns to flee, Sarah is shown to possess Deena, and kills Nick by stabbing him in the eye, causing the curse to cease and making the killers vanish. Some time later, life improves for the residents of Shadyside. Josh meets his online friend in person; Ziggy reunites with Nurse Lane and returns her diary; Kate, Simon, and Heather are commemorated by the school, and Deena and Sam have a picnic date at Sarah Fier's grave, naming her the first Shadysider. In a mid-credits scene, an unknown person steals the widow's satanic book from the tunnels.

== Cast ==
- Kiana Madeira as Sarah Fier / Deena
  - Elizabeth Scopel as "real" Sarah Fier
- Ashley Zukerman as Solomon Goode / Nick Goode
  - Ted Sutherland as young Nick Goode
- Gillian Jacobs as adult Ziggy / C. Berman
  - Sadie Sink as Constance / young Ziggy Berman
- Olivia Scott Welch as Hannah Miller / Samantha Fraser
- Benjamin Flores Jr. as Henry Fier / Josh
- Darrell Britt-Gibson as Martin
- Randy Havens as George Fier
- Julia Rehwald as Lizzie / Kate
- Matthew Zuk as Alderman Goode / Mayor Will Goode
- Fred Hechinger as Isaac / Simon
- Michael Chandler as "The Pastor" Cyrus Miller
- Emily Rudd as Abigail / Cindy Berman
- Lacey Camp as Grace Miller / Mrs. Fraser
- McCabe Slye as Mad Thomas / Tommy Slater
- Jordana Spiro as The Widow / Mrs. Lane
- Jeremy Ford as Caleb / Peter
- Jordyn DiNatale as Ruby Lane
- Mark Ashworth as Jakob Berman
- Ryan Simpkins as Alice
- Todd Allen Durkin as Officer Kapinski

== Production ==
On October 9, 2015, it was announced a film adaptation based on Stine's Fear Street book series was being developed by 20th Century Fox and Chernin Entertainment. On February 13, 2017, Kyle Killen was hired to write the script for the film. In July, the project was announced as a trilogy, with Janiak set to direct and rewrite the scripts with her partner Phil Graziadei. The films would be set in different time periods and shot back-to-back, with the intention of releasing them one month apart.

In March 2019, filming began on the first film in Atlanta and East Point, Georgia. Production also took place at Hard Labor Creek State Park in Rutledge in August 2019. Filming on the trilogy wrapped in September 2019.

== Release ==
The first film of the trilogy was scheduled to be released theatrically in June 2020, but was pulled from the schedule because of the COVID-19 pandemic. In April 2020, Chernin Entertainment ended their distribution deal with 20th Century Studios and made a multi-year first-look deal with Netflix. By August 2020, Netflix had acquired the distribution rights to the Fear Street Trilogy with a mid-2021 release date strategy for all three movies.

Fear Street Part Three: 1666 premiered at the Los Angeles State Historic Park on July 14, 2021. The first two films were released on July 2 and July 9, respectively, with the third film following on July 16, 2021.

== Reception ==
On the review aggregator website Rotten Tomatoes, the film holds an approval rating of 89% based on 99 reviews, with an average rating of 7.3/10. The website's critics consensus states, "Fear Street Part Three: 1666 sends the slasher series back in time for a trilogy-concluding installment that caps things off on a screaming high note." On Metacritic, the film has a weighted average score of 68 out of 100 based on 15 critic reviews, indicating "generally favorable" reviews.

Natalia Winkelman, in her review of the Fear Street trilogy for The New York Times, wrote, "Here, there is less to propel the action, and lacking in pop artifacts, lingo or fashion trends, Janiak struggles to recreate the fizzy and fun tone she achieved in the earlier movies," but added: "by Part Three, you feel safe following these survivors wherever they go." Clarisse Loughrey of The Independent gave the film a score of 3 out of five stars, writing that "even though Part Three is the weakest of the trilogy, director Leigh Janiak still manages to end on a high," and described it as "a thrilling finale that Janiak doses once more in old-school gore and deliciously garish neon." Donald Clarke, in his review of the Fear Street trilogy for The Irish Times, wrote that the film "owes more to The Crucible than it does to any American shocker", and stated: "Though the decision to have the puritan settlers speak in largely terrible Irish accents defies all reason, the closing section ties up some ends in a satisfactory whirl of implausibly well-scrubbed colonial paranoia."

Nick Allen of RogerEbert.com gave the film a score of 3 stars out of 4, describing it as a "triumphant finale" and writing, "Executed with the confidence of a victory lap, the last hour of 1666 is a series highlight, especially as it captures the brand of out-and-out fun that has made Janiak a newly minted crowd-pleaser in horror." Benjamin Lee of The Guardian gave the film a score of 4 stars out of 5, describing it as "The Crucible meets The Witch meets It meets It Follows meets the trilogy's ultimate overarching influence Scooby-Doo," and called it "a rousing finale to a winning new franchise." He concluded, "Janiak has found a way to add new life to old material, gifting us with the rare horror franchise that makes us want more rather than less, the prospect of an expanded universe seeming less like a curse and more of a blessing."

Lovia Gyarkye of The Hollywood Reporter described the film as "bloated" and stated that it "perfunctorily ties up the narrative loose ends with little finesse or energy — a shame because the earlier two entries, chock-full of pop culture references and subversive thematic underpinnings, had immense potential." She concluded, "by the end of Fear Street Part 3, when the mystery had been solved and justice ostensibly served, I was more relieved than anything else." Barry Hertz of The Globe and Mail wrote, "In Part Three, [Leigh Janiak] falls prey to the same problem as Part Two: her well-funded take on the work of folk-horror icons like Ken Russell, Piers Haggard and Mario Bava (with a big tip of the hat to contemporaries like Robert Eggers) is too safe, too slick, too far from gonzo." Inkoo Kang, in her review of the Fear Street trilogy for The Washington Post, wrote: "the trilogy's final scenes, which bring the action back to 1994, feel more like an iteration of Home Alone, with mindless stabbers taking the place of Joe Pesci and Daniel Stern. Those two might not have had any brains, either, but at least they had some personality."

The film ranks on Rotten Tomatoes' Best Horror Movies of 2021.
