= My Boys =

American television sitcom

- Genre: Sitcom
- Created by: Betsy Thomas
- Starring: Jordana Spiro; Jim Gaffigan; Kyle Howard; Reid Scott; Michael Bunin; Jamie Kaler; Kellee Stewart
- Composer: Ed Alton
- Country of origin: United States
- Original language: English
- No. of seasons: 4
- No. of episodes: 49 (list of episodes)

Production
- Executive producers: Betsy Thomas; Gavin Polone; Jamie Tarses
- Camera setup: Single-camera
- Production companies: Pariah; 2 Out Rally; Sony Pictures Television

Original release
- Network: TBS
- Release: November 28, 2006 – September 12, 2010

My Boys is an American television sitcom that aired from November 28, 2006 to September 12, 2010, on TBS. The show follows a sports columnist in Chicago, Illinois, played by Jordana Spiro, and the men in her life, including her brother and her best friend. The show was produced by Pariah, 2 Out Rally and Sony Pictures Television. The show was cancelled by TBS on September 14, 2010, after four seasons.

== Overview ==
PJ Franklin (Jordana Spiro) is a professional sportswriter looking for love within her world dominated by her group of male friends. Her "boys" are her family, which sometimes hinders PJ's dating life, as the men she tries to date do not know how to react to her unconventional interests and the all-important men in her life.

Her tomboyish, upfront approach to relationships tends to intimidate potential suitors, which leads her only female friend to advise her to dress and act more feminine. Being "one of the guys" can mean a lot of great things: poker games, pick-up softball games, watching sports, or just hanging out at a favorite bar. But, for PJ, being a girl who's one of the guys can be challenging.

During the first season, many of the episodes involved some of the characters going to match.com, a sponsor of the show, that is often referenced in conversation on the show.

== Cast and characters ==
=== Main ===
- Jordana Spiro portrays Penelope Jane "P.J." Franklin, a sportswriter for the Chicago Sun-Times, the protagonist, first-person narrator, and the core of the group. She becomes a columnist in season 3. In season 4, Bobby moves in with her after he loses his apartment.
- Jim Gaffigan portrays Andy Franklin, PJ's brother, whose wife was thought by the gang to keep him on a short leash; however, after she throws him a fabulous birthday party they realize she is a fun woman. Andy admits he likes using his wife as an excuse to go home because sometimes he feels tired and wants to go home, "like an old man." At the beginning of the 4th season, it is revealed that Andy has a new job and has moved to China with his family leaving Mike to safeguard his house until it is sold.
- Reid Scott portrays Brendan 'Brando' Dorff, a former hard-rock radio DJ and former roommate of PJ, whose on-again, off-again relationship with his girlfriend often leaves him crashing at PJ's apartment and eventually leads to him moving in with her again. In season 2, he loses his DJ job when the station is bought out by corporate interests. He is usually dressed in a band T-shirt. As of season 3, he is the manager of John's Club, an endeavor that he paired up with John, Bobby's friend whom he meets at Bobby's bachelor party. As of season 4, he has moved out on his own, no longer living with P.J., and in the season 4 finale, now owns Crowley's Bar after buying it to keep it from closing.
- Jamie Kaler portrays Mike Callahan, a commitment-challenged ladies' man, and the oldest member of the group turning 43 in season 4. He worked for the Chicago Cubs in season 1 but was laid off. Kenny reluctantly hired him to work at his sports memorabilia store. In season 4 Kenny is forced to shut down the store and Mike gets a job working in the public relations office for the Chicago Bulls. In the 4th-season finale, he marries his girlfriend of one month, Marcia, who lives next door to Andy's old house.
- Michael Bunin portrays Kenny Moritorri, a sports memorabilia store owner, who has not mastered the art of dating. He also has a love-hate relationship with Stephanie Layne. At the end of season 3, we see them having a secret relationship. As of season 4, they are openly dating and Kenny is forced to shut down the memorabilia store, starting a closet-organizing service. At the end of season 4, he leaves with Stephanie to London for her new talk-show panelist job in Britain.
- Kyle Howard portrays Bobby Newman, a sportswriter for the Chicago Tribune (the rival newspaper in Chicago), he was raised in one of the city's wealthiest families and is a love interest of PJ's. As of season 3, he and P.J. are dating. In mid-season 4, it is revealed that Bobby has lost his money due to his father's bad investments in a Ponzi scheme. He currently lives with P.J. and will begin to attend law school in Chicago.
- Kellee Stewart portrays Stephanie Layne, PJ's best friend, who gives her advice on men and dating from a female point of view. Author of a best-selling book about relationships, You're a Great Guy, But.... She also has a love/hate relationship with Kenny Moritorri. At the end of season 3, we see them having a secret relationship. As of season 4, they are openly dating and she has joined the group's poker nights since Andy has moved away. In the 4th-season finale, she is leaving for London with Kenny to start as a panelist on a British talk show.

=== Supporting ===
- Jeannie Noth portrays Meredith Franklin, Andy's wife. Andy uses her as an excuse to leave poker games early until PJ learns she's actually fun. Noth is Jim Gaffigan's real wife as well.
- Jay Tarses portrays Jack Briscoe, PJ's boss and mentor.
- Johnny Galecki portrays Trouty, a friend of Kenny's who was brought over to play poker one night. He also got the gang into an exclusive nightclub. At first, he comes off as quite annoying, but it is revealed he is a good guy who tries too hard. He constantly wears a hands-free phone piece in his ear.
- Eddie McClintock portrays Hank, one of PJ's old boyfriends. They broke up because Hank did not fit in with her friends, which was unacceptable to PJ.
- Jeremy Sisto portrays Thorn, PJ's summer fling from college. Their relationship was left open-ended until he comes back from Afghanistan to possibly rekindle a relationship with PJ. He is revealed to be engaged, but turns up later and announces that his relationship with his fiancée has ended.
- Travis Schuldt portrays Matt Dougan, the new Cubs pitcher, who persistently pursues PJ. They briefly date, but PJ breaks it off when she considers it would be unethical. The relationship opens up again when Matt reveals he is not a Cub anymore.
- Michael Landes portrays Evan, a botanist PJ meets at Andy's barbecue in the suburbs, who quickly becomes a love interest.
- Nia Vardalos portrays Jo, Andy's "work wife" who seems to want more than just being friends with him.
- Christopher McDonald portrays George Newman, Bobby's egotistical father.
- Billy Burke portrays Jack Newman, Bobby's smooth-talking brother who shows an interest in PJ.
- Mini Andén portrays Elsa, Bobby's former fiancée. She was also Andy's Swedish nanny. Bobby and Elsa called off their wedding hours before it was to take place.
- Lindsey Stoddart portrays Wendy, Brendan's former fiancée, who returns later —married and expecting a child.
- Rachael Harris portrays Marcia, an ad exec who moves in next door to Andy's and becomes involved with Mike.

== Episodes ==
Season	Episodes	Originally released	
Season	Episodes	First released	Last released
1	22	November 28, 2006	September 10, 2007
2	9	June 12, 2008	August 7, 2008
3	9	March 31, 2009	May 26, 2009
4	9	July 25, 2010	September 12, 2010

== Location ==
The series takes place in Chicago and makes references to many real-life Chicago locations, and even suburban areas and Northwest Indiana. These include Wrigley Field, Billy Goat Tavern, Metro, Churrascaria, and various bars and streets. Despite frequent second unit establishing shots of Chicago, almost all of the principal filming is done in Los Angeles. Three episodes, "Baseball Myths", "110% Solution", and "Rome, If You Want To", included scenes taking place in Chicago. Scenes took place in the Art Institute of Chicago, Northerly Island, the skydeck of the Sears Tower, and Wrigley Field. The last episode of season 3, called "Spring Training", was shot at the Chicago Cubs spring training facility and a nearby hotel in Mesa, Arizona.

== Production and broadcast ==
The first season seemed to end with a cliffhanger on December 28, 2006. The episode "The Promise of a New Season" aired July 30 and was originally billed as the beginning of the second season. The season had a mere 9 episodes. Later, the first 13 episodes which aired in 2006 were combined with these 9 episodes and the 22 episodes were together released as Season One on DVD. The show had been picked up for a second season with eight episodes, but ended up having 9 episodes. Season 2 premiered on Thursday, June 12, 2008. The second season, like the first, ended on a cliffhanger. The third season premiered on Tuesday, March 31, 2009, with another set of 9 episodes. The second-season cliffhanger is resolved, as Bobby and Elsa break off their engagement, and he admits to P.J. that he has feelings for her. The two date throughout the season, although they try to keep it a secret, to no avail. Meanwhile, Brendan opens the new club with John but quickly finds himself doing all of the work. After pointing out how valuable he is to John, he manages to negotiate a better salary and work schedule. He also realizes his pattern of dating mentally unstable women, such as the one in "Carpe Burritoem", has to stop; a point emphasized by the crazy "girlfriend" of Chicago Cubs player Mike Fontenot, who makes a cameo appearance in the season 3 finale. At the end of the season, it is revealed that not only did Kenny and Stephanie continue to secretly date after their night in Arizona, they are in love.

On October 7, 2008, TBS announced it would run a third season of the show. A new set of nine episodes premiered on March 31, 2009. On September 11, 2009, it was confirmed that the show has been picked up for a fourth season, although it would only head back into production in January 2010, with the new season premiering on TBS on July 25, 2010.

In Poland, the series aired on Fox Life.

== Home media ==
DVD name	Release date	Ep #	Additional information
The Complete First Season	June 10, 2008	22	Behind the Scenes featurette, Sports Quiz, Gag Reel, Deleted Scenes.
The Complete Second and Third Seasons	July 20, 2010	18	Subtitles in French.
The Complete Fourth and Final Season	April 3, 2012	9	
