= Panic (TV series) =

2021 American teen drama streaming television series

- Official poster
- Genre: Young adult; Drama
- Created by: Lauren Oliver
- Based on: Panic by Lauren Oliver
- Written by: Lauren Oliver
- Starring: Olivia Welch; Mike Faist; Jessica Sula; Ray Nicholson; Camron Jones; Enrique Murciano
- Music by: Isabella Summers; Brian H. Kim
- Country of origin: United States
- Original language: English
- No. of seasons: 1
- No. of episodes: 10

Production
- Executive producers: Adam Schroeder; Lauren Oliver; Jeff Kirschenbaum; Joe Roth; Ry Russo-Young
- Producer: Elle Triedman
- Cinematography: Todd McMullen; Bobby La Bonge
- Editors: Evan Schrodek; Phillip J. Bartell; James Kilton; Luke Pebler; Tony Costello
- Running time: 40–49 minutes
- Production companies: Adam Schroeder Entertainment; RK Films; Glasstown Entertainment; Picrow; Amazon Studios

Original release
- Network: Amazon Prime Video
- Release: May 28, 2021

Panic is an American teen drama television series created and written by Lauren Oliver based on her 2014 novel of the same name. The series stars Olivia Welch, Mike Faist, and Jessica Sula. The series premiered on Amazon Prime Video on May 28, 2021. In August 2021, the series was canceled after one season.

== Premise ==
In the summer after their senior year, 23 graduates participate in the annual risky Panic competition, in which graduating seniors complete dangerous tasks. Winning Panic and the cash prize of $50,000 allows them to escape their small Texas town of Carp and therefore improve their lives. The challenges are created by two secret judges and are designed to force the players to confront their deepest fears. After the rules change, however, they must decide what risks they will take to escape their hometown.

== Cast and characters ==
=== Main ===
- Olivia Welch as Heather Nill, a recent high school graduate who participates in Panic at the last minute, when her mom spends the tuition Heather saved. She lives in a trailer.
- Mike Faist as Dodge Mason, the new guy in Carp, Texas who participates in Panic, Natalie's love interest
- Jessica Sula as Natalie Williams, Heather's best friend who plans to participate in Panic from the start, but teams up with her to win Panic after Heather joins
- Ray Nicholson as Ray Hall, a legacy participant of Panic as his older brother Luke won Panic a few years ago, Heather's love interest
- Camron Jones as Bishop Moore, Heather's other best friend and love interest who watches Panic instead of participating. He comes from a wealthy family unlike most of his peers in Carp.
- Enrique Murciano as Sheriff James Cortez, the local sheriff, whose son died in previous year's Panic

=== Recurring ===
- Rachel Bay Jones as Sherri Nill, Heather's mother
- Nancy McKeon as Jessica Mason, Dodge's mother and Sheriff Cortez's mistress
- Todd Williams as Capt. John Williams, Natalie's father
- Lee Eddy as Sgt. Christine Langley, a police officer who investigates Panic
- David Thompson as Daniel Diggins, the host of this year's Panic
- Jordan Elsass as Tyler Young, a Panic participant who is also a friend of Ray's and the town's local drug dealer
- Maya Hendricks as Sarah Miller, Ray's half-sister
- Cosme Flores as Drew Santiago, a Panic participant
- Leslie Ann Leal as Summer Calvo, Daniel's co-host and the scorekeeper of Panic
- Stephen Dinh as Troy Van, a Panic player
- Kariana Karhu as Lily Nill, Heather's younger sister
- Tatiana Roberts as Shawna Kenny, a Panic participant
- Bryce Cass as Adam Lyons, a Panic player
- Sharmita Bhattacharya as Leela Agerwal, Bishop's friend
- Nasir Villanueva as Hunt Kenny, Shawna's older brother who coaches her for Panic
- Ben Cain as George Moore, Bishop's father who is a Carp judge
- Chris Zurcher as Max Slinger, a local freelance photographer
- Bonnie Bedelia as Anne McCarthy, a woman who offers Heather a job to work on her farm
- Moira Kelly as Melanie Cortez, Sheriff Cortez's wife
- Tate Panovich as Myra Campbell, the best friend of Abby who died in last year's Panic
- Madison Ferris as Dayna Mason, Dodge's sister who is disabled due an accident
- Kerri Medders as Ruby Anne McDonough
- Alex Nicole McConnell as Riley Dunne, Ruby Anne’s older sister
- Walker Babington as Luke Hall, Ray's older brother

== Episodes ==
No.	Title	Directed by	Written by	Original release date
1	"Panic"	Ry Russo-Young	Lauren Oliver	May 28, 2021
2	"Heights"	Ry Russo-Young	Lauren Oliver	May 28, 2021
3	"Traps"	Jamie Travis	Lauren Oliver	May 28, 2021
4	"Escape"	Jamie Travis	Lauren Oliver	May 28, 2021
5	"Phantoms"	Viet Nguyen	Lauren Oliver	May 28, 2021
6	"Dead-End"	Viet Nguyen	Lauren Oliver	May 28, 2021
7	"Trust"	Megan Griffiths	Lauren Oliver	May 28, 2021
8	"Returns"	Megan Griffiths	Lauren Oliver	May 28, 2021
9	"Cages"	Gandja Monteiro	Lauren Oliver	May 28, 2021
10	"Joust"	Gandja Monteiro	Lauren Oliver	May 28, 2021

== Production ==
=== Development ===
On June 28, 2018, it was announced that Amazon Studios had given the project a pilot order as part of their new young adult slate. Lauren Oliver was attached to create and write the adaptation of her own novel, as well as executive produce under her overall deal with Amazon Studios under her production company Glasstown Entertainment. Other executive producers included Joe Roth and Jeff Kirschenbaum of Roth/Kirschenbaum Films and Adam Schroeder. On August 8, 2018, Leigh Janiak was announced to be directing and executive producing the pilot. On May 16, 2019, it was announced that Amazon had given the project a series order. On August 6, 2021, Amazon canceled the series after one season.

=== Casting ===
On August 28, 2018, Olivia Welch, Mike Faist, and Ashlei Sharpe Chestnut were cast in lead roles for the pilot. On October 4, 2018, Ray Nicholson, Will Chase, and Kevin Alves were cast as series regulars. On October 21, Jessica Sula, Enrique Murciano, Camron Jones were cast in main roles, replacing Sharpe Chestnut, Chase, and Alves respectively. Bonnie Bedelia, Moira Kelly, Nancy McKeon, and Rachel Bay Jones were also cast in recurring roles. Bryce Cass joined the recurring cast in November 2019, followed by Kerri Medders in January 2020.

=== Filming ===
Filming on the original pilot took place throughout September 2018 in Los Angeles. The full series began filming in late October 2019 in the Austin, Texas area.

== Release ==
On April 5, 2021, it was announced that all 10 episodes of the series are scheduled to premiere on Amazon Prime Video on May 28, 2021.

== Tie-in media ==
On May 11, 2021, Audible announced that it would release an original three-part spin-off audio novella entitled Panic: Ghosts and Legends, also written by series creator Lauren Oliver, on May 28, 2021, to coincide with the launch of the original television series on Prime Video. The audio series will feature the voices of cast members Olivia Welch, Camron Jones, and Ray Nicholson.

== Reception ==
On Rotten Tomatoes, the series holds an approval rating of 65% based on 26 critic reviews, with an average rating of 6.7/10. The website's critical consensus reads, "It's completely preposterous and entirely too much, but Panic is never less than entertaining, no matter how far off the rails it flies." On Metacritic, it has a weighted average score of 54 out of 100, based on 10 critics, indicating "mixed or average reviews".
