= Julia Rehwald =

American actress

- Born: November 22, 1995 (age 30); Sacramento, California
- Occupation: Actress, singer
- Years active: 2017–present

Julia Rehwald (born November 22, 1995) is an American actress and singer. She is best known for playing Kate Schmidt in the slasher film series Fear Street (2021) and Tashigi in the second season of One Piece (2026).

== Early life ==
Rehwald was born in Sacramento, California on November 22, 1995. She has two siblings, a brother named James and a sister named Joanna. Her parents are from the Philippines. She attended St. Francis High School.

== Career ==
She first came into the public eye when she played Kate Schmidt in the slasher series Fear Street. Her performances were praised by critics and she has been referred to as a Scream Queen. She voiced Celesta Kami in the animated series Star Wars: Young Jedi Adventures. She starred alongside Holly Hunt in the sci-fi podcast series Alethea where she portrayed Sam Bixler. She played Tashigi in the second season of One Piece. She was also featured on Global Pinoys Of The Week on GMA Pinoy TV.

== Filmography ==
=== Film ===
Year	Title	Role	Notes	Ref.
2017	Where's Darren?	Isabel	Short	
2019	Mukbang masarap	Courtney	Short	
2021	Fear Street Part One: 1994	Kate Schmidt		
2021	Fear Street Part Two: 1978	Kate Schmidt		
2021	Fear Street Part Three: 1666	Kate Schmidt		
2026	The Last Hurrah	Kit	Short	

=== Television ===
Year	Title	Role	Notes	Ref.
2023	Alethea	Sam Bixler	Podcast; 10 episodes	
2024–2025	Star Wars: Young Jedi Adventures	Celesta Kami	5 episodes	
2026 - present	One Piece	Tashigi	Recurring role	
