= List of My Boys episodes =

My Boys is an American television sitcom that debuted on November 28, 2006, on TBS. The show revolves around Penelope Jane "P.J." Franklin (Jordana Spiro), a female sports columnist in Chicago, and the men in her life including her brother, her ex-boyfriend, her best friend, and a sportswriter for a rival publication.

The first season was split into two parts, with 13 episodes being shown in late 2006 and 9 episodes in the summer of 2007. Season two was shown in the middle of 2008 while the third season was shown in early 2009. The fourth season premiered on July 25, 2010. On September 14, 2010 it was announced that TBS decided to not renew My Boys for a fifth season. A total of 49 episodes were broadcast over 4 seasons.

== Series overview ==
Season	Episodes	Originally released	
Season	Episodes	First released	Last released
1	22	November 28, 2006	September 10, 2007
2	9	June 12, 2008	August 7, 2008
3	9	March 31, 2009	May 26, 2009
4	9	July 25, 2010	September 12, 2010

== Episodes ==
=== Season 1 (2006–07) ===
No. overall	No. in season	Title	Directed by	Written by	Original release date
1	1	"Pilot"	Barnet Kellman	Betsy Thomas	November 28, 2006
PJ meets Bobby, the new Chicago Tribune reporter covering the Chicago Cubs. PJ is instantly attracted to him, and looks to pursue a relationship with him. They end up kissing, but Bobby admits that he doesn't know if he can actually date her, PJ is too much like 'one of the guys.' Brendan breaks up with his long-time girlfriend, Wendy, and crashes at PJ's place.
2	2	"Mixed Signals"	Barnet Kellman	Betsy Thomas	November 28, 2006
PJ and Bobby get their signals mixed up about their relationship, due to PJ's excessive use of baseball metaphors, so the guys don't find out about their previous relationship. Bobby ends up dating a new girl, Claire.
3	3	"Team Chemistry"	Matthew Diamond	Cindy Caponera	December 5, 2006
Brendan dates a fan of his radio show, and the woman is constantly at PJ's house, which annoys her. The boys find out about PJ and Bobby previously dating. PJ tries to set up Mike's friend with Stephanie, which backfires, as Mike's friend is attracted to PJ instead.
4	4	"The Slump"	Victor Nelli, Jr.	Eric Gilliland	December 5, 2006
Brendan, Kenny, and Mike try to get out of their dating slump by going to a pick-up bar, but are foiled by PJ joining them. Stephanie tries to get PJ to be more feminine. Brendan gets back together with Wendy.
5	5	"The Show"	Robert Duncan McNeill	Rick Singer	December 12, 2006
Brendan gets engaged to Wendy. PJ and Hank's dating cuts into PJ's time with the boys.
6	6	"Clubhouse Cancer"	Arlene Sanford	Courtney Lilly	December 12, 2006
PJ's attempts to integrate her boyfriend into the poker game doesn't go too well, nor does Kenny's new addition named Trouty (recurring guest star Johnny Galecki). When she tries to get the boys to hang out with her new beau, she's compelled to make a parallel agreement and spend some time with Wendy, Brendan's on-again off-again girlfriend.
7	7	"Free Agent"	Victor Nelli, Jr.	Rob Ulin	December 19, 2006
PJ begins to question her relationship with Hank after she opts out of the group's annual decathlon, a night of drinking and games. Part of her problem is that Hank doesn't really gel with the boys and the other part is that she finds herself more and more attracted to Bobby, especially after a work trip winds up with them sleeping together. Bobby and PJ agree not to tell anyone what happened. Hank believes that everything PJ is going through is a phase, and PJ admits to herself that she likes spending time with her friends than with her boyfriend. So, PJ decides to break up with Hank and become a "free agent," breaking off Hank's plans to go to Spain with her.
8	8	"Superstar Treatment"	Arvin Brown	Brendan Smith	December 19, 2006
PJ tries to get an exclusive interview with the Cubs' big free agent acquisition but finds the task to be problematic. Meanwhile, she must deal with a legendary sports reporter plagiarizing her. Mike dates a woman of whom PJ is suspicious until she helps her get an interview with Garcia. The woman dumps Mike for another athlete, thus confirming PJ's suspicions.
9	9	"Managers"	Don Scardino	Courtney Lilly	December 26, 2006
Andy becomes "Fun Andy" when Meredith takes the kids for the weekend while their house gets fumigated, but goes overboard with the drinking, and ends up getting lost in the Chicago streets, to be found with druggies, as Andy is extremely drunk, and possibly on drugs himself. Stephanie goes on a fasting diet, which makes her far more energetic (and sometimes bossy). Going beyond his usual "out for coffee," Kenny takes a girl for a date, but meets his downfall when Mike starts telling Kenny what to do on the date, which upsets Kenny. Brendan moves out of PJ's apartment, and moves in with his new fiancee, Wendy.
10	10	"Take One for the Team" "Love of the Game"	Keith Truesdell	Eric Gilliland	December 26, 2006
Trouty gets the gang into an exclusive club, but the guys are annoyed at his personality getting in the way again. PJ goes out with the club manager (guest star Colin Ferguson) in order for the gang to get back into the club. PJ gains new respect for Trouty when he rescues her from the aggressive club manager. The boys get kicked out of the club for ragging on Trouty, but also see a new side of him.
11	11	"When Heroes Fall From Grace"	Barnet Kellman	Cindy Caponera	December 27, 2006
PJ and Andy’s aunt Phyllis (guest star Laurie Metcalf) visits Chicago for the weekend. PJ is thrilled because Phyllis is her hero. Things get a little weird for her when Phyllis and Kenny hook up. PJ doesn’t want Kenny to get hurt so she asks Phyllis to make sure they are on the same page. But Phyllis takes off before doing so, leaving both Kenny and PJ very disappointed. Meanwhile Mike meets his idol, baseball legend Danny Finn (guest star Neil Flynn), who later turns out to be a jerk. Brendan and Wendy call off their wedding.
12	12	"Released"	David Trainer	Rick Singer	December 27, 2006
PJ goes on a ‘mercy’ date with old college buddy Keith and then can’t get rid of him, which results in PJ going on three dates. Bobby tells Kenny that Mike is going to get fired and agree not to tell Mike to protect his pride. Mike ends up getting fired and learns that Bobby knew in advance and gets upset with him. Meanwhile, Brendan is trying to get over Wendy by giving up alcohol, and his friends notice a change in him- no alcohol makes Brendan boring. By the end of the episode, he goes back into his old ways.
13	13	"Baseball Myths"	Arlene Sanford	Courtney Lilly, Brendan Smtih	December 28, 2006
As everyone 'comes clean' to everything they've done during a night of drinking, PJ confesses that she and Brendan made out in college. PJ gets annoyed when Brendan claims to have forgotten that he 'wassup-ed' her after their kiss, as no one remembers the incident. Meredith, Andy's wife, throws him a surprise birthday party after a day of Andy hanging out with his friends (and sister). After the party, Brendan confesses to PJ that he did recall the scene after their kiss, but he felt guilty. He also says that he wanted to pursue things with PJ in college, but didn't know how to, as they were (and are) best friends. The both of them agree to put it all in the past, and that nothing could come between their friendship- as they are both very important in each other's lives. As PJ's narrative comes in (which signals the end of the episode) and she pours herself a drink, Brendan comes into the room and deeply kisses her, breaking their newly agreed 'best friend status.' The episode ends with PJ giving Brendan a confused look.
14	14	"Promise of a New Season"	Victor Nelli, Jr.	Betsy Thomas	July 30, 2007
Told partly in flashback, PJ tries to understand "the kiss" she shared with Brendan and why he's acting so oddly toward her. Meanwhile the gang is surprised when they meet Kenny's new girlfriend, Kimmie (Nicole Sullivan), who happens to be pregnant.
15	15	"Off Day"	Barnet Kellman	Brendan Smith	July 30, 2007
PJ takes part in a local cable sports show and shows a poor performance. The boys try to hide it from her, but in the end are forced to tell her she "swung and missed".
16	16	"Ethics"	Arlene Sanford	Eric Gilliland	August 6, 2007
PJ agrees to go on a date with a Chicago Cubs pitcher, but later decides to break things off for fear of ruining her journalistic credibility.
17	17	"Dirty Little Secrets"	Victor Nelli, Jr.	Sebastian Jones	August 13, 2007
Bobby turns out to be a millionaire and lives in a fancy apartment and Stephanie is in debt and has to move. Mikes becomes an employee at Kenny's shop.
18	18	"Second Chances"	Barnet Kellman	Courtney Lilly	August 20, 2007
P.J. (Jordana Spiro) gets a call from an old friend, Thorn (Jeremy Sisto), and suddenly buried feelings begin to resurface. When Mike (Jamie Kaler) has trouble finding a job, Kenny (Michael Bunin) offers him a position at his memorabilia shop. Meanwhile, Brendan (Reid Scott) is forced to "DTR" (define the relationship) with Colleen, and Stephanie (Kellee Stewart) struggles to stay out of debt with the help of her fiscal fitness coach, Lance.
19	19	"Douchebag in the City"	Arlene Sanford	Ethan Sandler, Adrian Wenner	August 27, 2007
While Brendan's (Reid Scott) elevated social status takes a toll on his friends, P.J.'s (Jordana Spiro) former editor visits from New York and things don't go the way she plans. In the meantime, Andy (Jim Gaffigan) becomes acquainted with his neighbors in suburbia, and Mike (Jamie Kaler) orders a piece of memorabilia for the store that is not exactly what Kenny (Michael Bunin) had in mind.
20	20	"The Estates of Hoffman"	Rob Greenberg	Mark Stegemann	September 3, 2007
Andy invites the gang to come to a housewarming barbecue at his new digs in the suburbs. Once they arrive, PJ realizes her brother’s home is identical in every way to their home when they were kids. Also attending the barbecue are PJ and Andy’s parents: Eileen, their intrusive mother who spoils a big surprise, and Frank, whom Andy is convinced is the future version of himself. Brendan, Kenny and Mike desperately pursue a young single mom while PJ meets a nice young man from the city.
21	21	"110 Percent Solution"	Victor Nelli, Jr.	Eric Gilliland	September 10, 2007
Stephanie expresses her concern to PJ when she subjects her new love interest, Evan, to a game of poker with the gang, a game during which Evan feels completely invisible. Meanwhile, Andy decides to buy a boat to placate his feelings of not being able to have a place to himself. Unfortunately, however, he decides not to tell his wife, Meredith, about the purchase. And Kenny, Mike, Brendan and the rest of the gang try to one-up each other by comparing pain thresholds.
22	22	"Rome, If You Want To"	Betsy Thomas	Sebastian Jones	September 10, 2007
Italy is just days away, and PJ still doesn’t have a date. But it isn’t for lack of opportunities, as three of the men in her life make welcome but untimely returns, including botanist Evan, globe-trotting reporter Thorn Packer and Cubs player Matt Dougan. Meanwhile, the gang decides to be tourists in their hometown taking in all the Chicago sites they’ve never seen, such as the Art Institute and the Sears Tower. P.J. finally makes a decision regarding her date to Rome, and is surprised to find him in first class holding a glass of champagne.

=== Season 2 (2008) ===
No. overall	No. in season	Title	Directed by	Written by	Original release date
23	1	"The Transitioning"	Barnet Kellman	Betsy Thomas	June 12, 2008
When we last left the show PJ was having trouble finding somebody to take to Rome, Italy. She has to choose between 3 guys, including botanist Evan, globe-trotting reporter Thorn Packer and now ex-Cubs player Matt Dougan, each of whom has different characteristics. When the flight is ready to leave, PJ arrives saying she has made her decision of whom to take to Rome and is surprised to find out that he is in first class with a bottle of champagne, it is Bobby. PJ and Stephanie are off to Italy with their men. Stephanie's shocked to see who PJ's mystery man is, and it doesn't take her long to get in PJ's business, making the trip a little less romantic. Meanwhile in Chicago, the boys can't function without PJ keeping them in line, and life quickly gets out of control when one of them breaks the "hang out" code, getting them banned from Crowley's.
24	2	"Dinner Party"	David Trainer	Sebastian Jones	June 19, 2008
Andy and Meredith hire a nanny, Elsa, who happens to be hot and from Sweden. When the guys fight for her affections, it is Bobby who wins. Meanwhile, PJ tries setting up Kenny and Mike with her friends but much to Mike's dismay, the girls are only interested in Kenny.
25	3	"The Shirt Contest"	Barnet Kellman	Brendan Smith	June 26, 2008
After Mike arrogantly proclaims he can make a shirt from scratch, he, Kenny, Brendan and Bobby decide to hold a shirt contest. Each one will have $20 to spend on materials, and the one to make the best shirt will get free booze for a month. Meanwhile, PJ decides to write a book with a popular athlete. Things take a turn for the worse when the player decides it's not a priority. Andy has been spending long hours at the office with his new coworker just as Bobby begins spending more time at Andy’s with his new girlfriend, Elsa. And Brendan decides to become a bartender after losing his DJ job to a computer, but his first job interview delivers the shock of his life.
26	4	"Spit Take"	Paul Maibaum	Adrian Wenner	July 3, 2008
The gang, especially PJ, is stunned to learn that Bobby has proposed to Elsa who is in danger of being deported. Meanwhile, Mike joins Andy's Improv class and Stephanie's book is an instant success.
27	5	"Take My Work Wife...Please"	Barnet Kellman	Courtney Lilly	July 10, 2008
Kenny begins to date two women and this drives Mike insane. Andy decides to set Mike up with his work wife, Jo, in hopes to boost his mojo but learns she's only interested in Andy. Brendan takes a temp job at Andy's law firm and the guys read Stephanie's book only to discover she's used them as source material.
28	6	"Dudes Being Dudes"	Arlene Sanford	Corey Nickerson	July 17, 2008
PJ is annoyed when she learns that she isn't invited to Bobby's bachelor party. Instead, Bobby asks her to attend Elsa's bridal shower. Brendan is stressed about how much he may have to spend on the bachelor party. Meanwhile, PJ finally tells Bobby about her feelings for him.
29	7	"Opportunity Knocks"	Rob Greenberg	Brendan Smith	July 24, 2008
After they share a kiss, PJ is torn between whether to pursue things with Jack or not. Meanwhile, Andy and Meredith seek marriage counseling and Kenny has another run in with Mexican Freddy.
30	8	"Jack & Bobby"	Arlene Sanford	Corey Nickerson	July 31, 2008
The gang travel to California for Bobby's wedding. PJ tries to hide her blooming relationship with Jack from Bobby. Meanwhile Mike meets an older woman.
31	9	"John, Cougar, Newman Camp"	Betsy Thomas	Sebastian Jones	August 7, 2008
After Jack's sudden departure from the wedding, the gang, including PJ, step in as Bobby's "best men" and try to help the wedding run smoothly. Mike continues to pine after Maggie and Kenny and Stephanie come to a truce.

=== Season 3 (2009) ===
No. overall	No. in season	Title	Directed by	Written by	Original release date
32	1	"Welcome Back, Kalla Fötter"	Betsy Thomas	Sebastian Jones	March 31, 2009
Dramas are swirling around Bobby and his impending marriage to Elsa, the Swedish nanny. Meanwhile, PJ's fling hits an obstacle with Bobby's brother; the boys compete in a mustache growing contest; and Andy welcomes a new member to his family
33	2	"Private Eyes"	Rob Greenberg	Maggie Bandur	April 7, 2009
PJ starts dating someone but keeping it a secret from their friends proves to be incredibly difficult. Brendan is taking on more responsibility than he anticipated when it comes to opening a new nightclub. And Mike finds some good reasons to keep his mustache, even after the guys’ contest is over.
34	3	"The Boyfriend Hat"	Barnet Kellman	Courtney Lilly	April 14, 2009
When PJ gets a promotion, the gang insinuates she got it because of her looks. Meanwhile Brendan introduces a new bar to Mike and Kenny.
35	4	"Decathlon: Part Deux"	Phil Traill	Brendan Smith	April 21, 2009
During the annual board game decathlon, Bobby criticizes PJ for being competitive. Meanwhile Stephanie uses the guys as research for an article she is writing.
36	5	"Carpe Burritoem"	Arlene Sanford	Adrian Wenner	April 28, 2009
Brendan agrees to let PJ make all his decisions for him while Stephanie uses Mike as a guinea pig for her book seminar. Meanwhile, Kenny starts a band and takes it a little too seriously.
37	6	"Madder of Degrees"	Rob Greenberg	Sebastian Jones	May 5, 2009
A sudden wave of warm weather in the middle of a brutal Chicago winter brings out impulsiveness and romance in the gang.
38	7	"Facebook the Past"	Arlene Sanford	Courtney Lilly, Marcia Fields	May 12, 2009
The gang discusses the pros and cons of Facebook. Meanwhile things get sticky when Bobby realizes PJ keeps in touch with all her exes.
39	8	"Friends of Friends"	Fred Savage	Maggie Bandur	May 19, 2009
PJ hits it off with one of Stephanie's friends while Kenny and Mike introduce a new friend to the group much to Andy's dismay.
40	9	"Spring Training"	Phil Traill	Adrian Wenner, Brendan Smith	May 26, 2009
The gang heads to Arizona for spring training while PJ looks for something unique and fresh to write about in her column.

=== Season 4 (2010) ===
No. overall	No. in season	Title	Directed by	Written by	Original release date	US viewers (millions)
41	1	"Addition By Subtraction"	Betsy Thomas	Sebastian Jones	July 25, 2010	1.077
Andy and his family move to rural China, leaving the gang one person short for their poker night. Stephanie tries to convince Kenny to come to a tango class. While trying to find a new person for poker night the gang reminisce about how they all first met.
42	2	"Gourmets and Confused"	Mark Stegemann	Adrian Wenner	July 25, 2010	1.077
PJ, Bobby, Stephanie, and Kenny go out to a fancy restaurant. Feeling slighted, Mike convinces Brendan to forgo their night of video games to dress up in suits and behave like gentlemen in hopes of meeting some classy ladies. After an incident over poor service at the restaurant the group go back to PJ's where they find the "special" brownies that Brendan baked.
43	3	"Mike-Fest"	Eric Gilliland	Brendan Smith	August 1, 2010	1.054
Mike wants the gang to throw him a surprise party for his birthday. A movie producer is interested in turning Stephanie's book into a movie. Bobby learns that his father invested the entire family fortune with an investor who ran a ponzi scheme.
44	4	"Be a Man!"	David Trainer	Maggie Bandur	August 8, 2010	1.169
Mike and Kenny attempt to complete 100 things a man should know according to a men's magazine. Stephanie asks for suggestions on her next book. Bobby fixes PJ's kitchen sink. Brendan dates a 22-year-old, but can't keep up with her.
45	5	"The NTO"	Millicent Shelton	Ethan Sandler	August 15, 2010	0.819
PJ worries that her relationship with Bobby has cooled off. Mike lands a job with the Chicago Bulls after the sports memorabilia store he runs with Kenny has to close.
46	6	"Hanger Management"	David Trainer	Sebastian Jones	August 22, 2010	1.019
Brendan moves out of PJ's apartment. Bobby decides to go to law school. Kenny starts a closet organization business. Stephanie and Mike get hooked on watching the 2010 FIFA World Cup
47	7	"Puss 'N' Glutes"	Arlene Sanford	Maggie Bandur, Adrian Wenner	September 5, 2010	0.907
PJ and Stephanie tutor Brendan and Mike in meeting women who aren't crazy, while Bobby and Kenny decide to become workout partners. Mike housesits for Andy and gets hit on repeatedly by Andy's new neighbor.
48	8	"Extreme Mike-Over"	David Trainer	Ethan Sandler, Brendan Smith	September 12, 2010	0.879
Crowley's is being taken over by obnoxious college grads and the gang decides they may need to find a new bar. Meanwhile, as things between Mike and Marcia progress, we learn that he's keeping something from her.
49	9	"My Men"	Betsy Thomas	Betsy Thomas	September 12, 2010	0.689
Mike wants to throw a birthday party for Marcia and recruits the gang to help him plan, but PJ is suddenly immersed by work. Meanwhile, Stephanie has a great career opportunity in London and Brendan has a very important decision to make.
