= Fear Street Part Two: 1978 =

2021 film by Leigh Janiak

- Release poster
- Directed by: Leigh Janiak
- Screenplay by: Zak Olkewicz; Leigh Janiak
- Story by: Zak Olkewicz; Phil Graziadei; Leigh Janiak
- Based on: Fear Street by R. L. Stine
- Produced by: Peter Chernin; Jenno Topping; David Ready
- Starring: Sadie Sink; Emily Rudd; Ryan Simpkins; McCabe Slye; Ted Sutherland; Gillian Jacobs; Kiana Madeira; Benjamin Flores Jr.; Olivia Scott Welch; Chiara Aurelia
- Cinematography: Caleb Heymann
- Edited by: Rachel Goodlett Katz
- Music by: Marco Beltrami; Brandon Roberts
- Production company: Chernin Entertainment
- Distributed by: Netflix
- Release dates: July 8, 2021 (Los Angeles); July 9, 2021 (United States)
- Running time: 110 minutes
- Country: United States
- Language: English
- Budget: $10 million

Fear Street Part Two: 1978 (titled onscreen as Fear Street 1978) is a 2021 American supernatural slasher film directed by Leigh Janiak. It is the second installment in the Fear Street trilogy, with a script co-written by Janiak and Zak Olkewicz from a story by Janiak, Olkewicz and Phil Graziadei, based on R. L. Stine's book series of the same name. Primarily set in the summer of 1978, the film follows a group of teens at Camp Nightwing as they face a deadly killing spree connected to the dark past of Shadyside. It stars Sadie Sink, Emily Rudd, Ryan Simpkins, McCabe Slye, Ted Sutherland, Gillian Jacobs, Kiana Madeira, Benjamin Flores Jr., and Olivia Scott Welch.

Produced by Chernin Entertainment, a film adaptation of Fear Street began development at 20th Century Fox in 2015, with Janiak hired in 2017. Filming for the trilogy took place back-to-back from March to September 2019 in Georgia, with the intention of a theatrical release beginning June 2020. However, due to the COVID-19 pandemic and the acquisition of 21st Century Fox by Disney, Chernin ended their distribution deal with 20th Century and Netflix subsequently acquired distribution rights in August 2020.

Fear Street Part Two: 1978 premiered at the Los Angeles State Historic Park on July 8, 2021, and was released by Netflix on July 9, 2021 a week after the first film Part One: 1994. The film received generally positive reviews from critics and is considered to be the best film of the trilogy. The final installment, Part Three: 1666, was released on July 16.

== Plot ==
In 1994, Deena and Josh restrain a possessed Sam and travel to C. Berman's house for help. Initially reluctant, Berman allows them inside and begins recounting the events of the Camp Nightwing massacre that occurred 16 years ago.

On July 19, 1978, Ziggy Berman, a teen from Shadyside is caught stealing money from Sheila, a Sunnyvale teen, and her friends. They accuse her of being a witch and, in retaliation, tie her up and hang her from a tree and burn her arm with a lighter before camp counsellors Nick Goode and Kurt intervene. Ziggy's older sister, Cindy Berman, and her boyfriend Thomas “Tommy” Slater are cleaning the mess hall when Nurse Lane, the mother of Ruby Lane, attacks Tommy and she is removed from the campgrounds by police. The Sunnyvale teens believe she was possessed by Sarah Fier, as was her daughter Ruby.

While investigating the infirmary, Cindy and Tommy encounter counselors Alice, Cindy's former friend, and her boyfriend, Arnie. They discover Nurse Lane's diary, which says that Sarah Fier made a deal with the devil by cutting off her hand on Satan's stone, in exchange for eternal life. They also find a map in the diary leading to what they believe is Sarah Fier's house.

At the house, they find empty graves dug up by Nurse Lane and discover the witch's mark below the house. Alice and Cindy find a wall carved with the names of all the Shadyside killers, and Tommy's name is included. Now fully possessed, Tommy kills Arnie and the girls escape into a cave. At camp, Nick helps Ziggy prank Sheila to lock her in the outhouse.

As the two bond and share a kiss, Tommy has returned back to camp and murders several Shadysiders. Cindy and Alice try to escape using the witch's mark in the diary as a map of the cave. They soon come across a pile of beating organs, and when Alice touches it, it shows her flashbacks of all the past killers and their victims.

After Alice injures her leg, she reconciles with Cindy and the two reach a cave opening beneath the outhouse. Ziggy and counsellor Gary attempt to rescue Alice and Cindy. Tommy kills Gary and Ziggy hides with Nick until Nick is injured and she escapes to the mess hall. As the rest of the camp leaves via bus, Cindy finds a route to the mess hall while Alice stays behind. Tommy attacks Ziggy, but Cindy kills him. Alice arrives and tells them that she found Sarah Fier’s lost hand.

The trio decides to end the curse by reuniting Sarah Fier’s hand with her body, which is rumored to be buried by the "Hanging Tree". Ziggy’s nose suddenly bleeds on the hand and sees a vision of Sarah Fier. This triggers the curse, resurrecting several Shadyside killers. A reanimated Tommy kills Alice before Cindy decapitates him.

Ziggy and Cindy run to the tree where Sarah Fier was hanged, with the Shadyside killers in pursuit, only to find a rock with the words "The witch forever lives" carved buried underneath the tree. Cindy sacrifices herself but the two are murdered and the killers disappear. Nick later finds them and saves Ziggy via CPR.

Back in 1994, Deena and Josh realize that C. Berman is Ziggy, whose real name is Christine Berman. They tell her that they found Sarah Fier’s body and now, with the hand, they can end the curse. Deena and Josh find the hand buried in the Shadyside Mall and reach Sarah Fier’s burial place. Deena reunites the hand with her body. Deena's nose bleeds, and she finds herself back in 1666, where she is now Sarah Fier.

== Cast ==
- Sadie Sink as Ziggy Berman
  - Gillian Jacobs as C. Berman / adult Ziggy
- Emily Rudd as Cindy Berman
- Ryan Simpkins as Alice
- McCabe Slye as Tommy Slater
- Ted Sutherland as young Nick Goode
  - Ashley Zukerman as Sheriff Nick Goode
- Jordana Spiro as Nurse Mary Lane
- Kiana Madeira as Deena
- Benjamin Flores Jr. as Josh
- Olivia Scott Welch as Sam
- Chiara Aurelia as Sheila
- Jordyn DiNatale as Ruby Lane
- Drew Scheid as Gary
- Sam Brooks as Arnie
- Paul Teal as young Officer Kapinski
- Jacqi Vené as Joan
- Michael Provost as Kurt
- Brandon Spink as young Will Goode
  - Matthew Zuk as Mayor Will Goode
- Elizabeth Scopel as Sarah Fier
- Julia Rehwald as Kate (Note: Appeared through archive footage from Fear Street Part One: 1994.)
- Fred Hechinger as Simon

== Production ==
On October 9, 2015, it was announced that a film based on Stine's Fear Street series was being developed by 20th Century Fox and Chernin Entertainment. Screenwriter Zak Olkewicz was hired to write the script for the second film while Kyle Killen and Silka Lusia were assigned to Part One and Part Three respectively. In July 2017, Leigh Janiak was hired to lead the project, directing and rewriting the films. Janiak oversaw a writers room with her writing partner, Phil Graziadei. In January 2019, Alex Ross Perry was slated to direct the second installment. By March of that year, Perry stepped down, and Janiak was confirmed as directing all three films, a trilogy set in different time periods, and shot back-to-back, with the intention of releasing the films one month apart.

In April 2019, Gillian Jacobs, Sadie Sink, Emily Rudd and McCabe Slye joined the cast. In March 2019, filming had begun on the first film in Atlanta and East Point, Georgia. Production also took place at Hard Labor Creek State Park in Rutledge in August 2019. Despite being the second film of the trilogy, 1978 was the last of the three films to be shot. Filming wrapped in September 2019.

== Release ==
The first film of the trilogy was scheduled to be released theatrically in June 2020, but it was pulled from the schedule because of the COVID-19 pandemic. In April 2020, Chernin Entertainment ended their distribution deal with 20th Century Studios and made a multi-year first-look deal with Netflix. By August 2020, Netflix had acquired the distribution rights to the Fear Street trilogy. The film premiered at the Los Angeles State Historic Park on July 8, 2021 before it was released on Netflix on July 9, 2021.

== Reception ==
On the review aggregator website Rotten Tomatoes, the film holds an approval rating of 88% based on 109 reviews, with an average rating of 6.9/10. The website's critics consensus states, "A smart and subversive twist on slasher horror, Fear Street Part II: 1978 shows that summer camp has never been scarier thanks to stellar performances from Sadie Sink, Emily Rudd, and Ryan Simpkins." According to Metacritic, which assigned a weighted average score of 61 out of 100 based on 16 critics, the film received "generally favorable" reviews.

Natalia Winkelman, in her review of the Fear Street trilogy for The New York Times, described 1978 as being the strongest film in the trilogy, and wrote: "the change in scenery ensures that "Part Two" never feels like a clone of "Part One"." Writing for Empire, Ian Freer gave the film a score of 3 stars out of 5, writing: "It might not work as well as Part One: 1994, but it cements the idea that telling a narrative in feature-length installments ... can be a fruitful mode for ambitious long-form storytelling", but stated: "As the plot splits the teens up, there is little of the engaging interplay between the friends of the first part and, with only one type of maniac on the loose, the kills themselves feel same-y, less imaginative."

Lovia Gyarkye of The Hollywood Reporter described the film as being "its own exhilarating adventure that showcases a dynamic cast of characters and revels in lots and lots of bloody murder." She concluded: "For me, the best parts of Fear Street Part 2 are the ones in which the teen drama takes center stage — from the illicit romantic pairings to the crazy feuds and pranks. Genre purists will be relieved that none of that comes at the expense of grisly murder scenes; Janiak spares no one, and there's no shortage of inventive deaths." Kevin Maher of The Times gave the film a score of 3 stars out of 5, writing: "As with the first outing, the director Leigh Janiak proves herself an impeccable stylist, delivering muted 1970s tones, judiciously judged scares and ceaseless tap-a-long tunes".

Nick Allen of RogerEbert.com gave the film a score of 2 out of 4 stars. He wrote that the "hacking is top-notch", and praised the score by Marco Beltrami and Brandon Roberts, but concluded that the film is "a frustrating bummer—a summer camp slasher that's afraid of campiness, and one that'd be a better fit for group therapy sessions than sleepovers." Barry Hertz of The Globe and Mail wrote: "While Part One stands as a fine-enough ode to the slasher renaissance of the mid-1990s ... Part Two proves that the entire Fear Street enterprise could have easily kept its time-hopping ambitions to a two-hour kill fest", adding: "the big and bloody problem with Part Two is that, by making a horror flick set at a 1970s summer camp with a contemporary perspective and budget, director Leigh Janiak has set herself up for failure."

The film ranks on Rotten Tomatoes' Best Horror Movies of 2021.

== Sequel ==
The trilogy continues with Part Three: 1666, which was released on July 16, 2021.
