= Leigh Janiak =

American filmmaker

- Born: Leigh Anne Janiak; February 1, 1980 (age 46); Ohio, U.S.
- Education: University of Chicago; New York University
- Occupations: Director; screenwriter; producer
- Years active: 2005–present
- Spouse: Ross Duffer (m. 2015; sep. 2024)

Leigh Anne Janiak (born February 1, 1980) is an American filmmaker. She is best known for directing the horror films Honeymoon (2014) and the Fear Street trilogy (2021).

== Early life and education ==
Janiak was born and raised in Ohio, U.S. She graduated from Mentor High School in Mentor, Ohio, where she was heavily involved in theater.

She completed an undergraduate course in comparative religion at New York University, before studying at the Gallatin School of Individualized Study, and then at a graduate school at the University of Chicago, where she was studying for a PhD in Modern Jewish literature. Janiak left before completing her doctorate.

== Career ==
Janiak moved to Los Angeles in 2005, where she worked for two production companies. Her first industry job was at Leonardo DiCaprio's production company, Appian Way, as a producer's assistant. Prior to directing Honeymoon, Janiak turned down an opportunity to direct a network television show, as one of the conditions of the directing job required her to shadow a veteran director. Janiak was afraid that shadowing a veteran director would affect her career as a female filmmaker as she did not want to be stigmatized. Janiak made her directorial debut with the horror film Honeymoon, starring Rose Leslie and Harry Treadaway, debuting the film at the South by Southwest Festival in 2014. The film's development started in 2010, and Janiak began writing the script together with Phil Graziadei in 2012. The film was shot in 2013 in North Carolina on a limited budget. It received positive reviews from critics, with review aggregator Rotten Tomatoes' critics' consensus stating that it "packs more slow-building horror than many bigger-budget productions."

In May 2015, Sony Pictures announced that Janiak would be writing and directing a remake of the 1996 horror film The Craft. In 2017, The Hollywood Reporter reported that Janiak was no longer attached to the project. Janiak directed some episodes of horror TV shows Scream and Outcast. She directed season 1, episode 7, "In the Trenches" and season 2, episode 9, "The Orphange" for Scream. For Outcast, she directed season 1, episode 7, "The Damage Done". She also directed season 1, episode 1 of Amazon Studios' 2021 teen drama series Panic. All of her contributions in television were received well by fans.

In July 2017, a trilogy of films adapting R. L. Stine's Fear Street series of novels was announced by 20th Century Fox, with Janiak set to direct and rewrite the scripts with Graziadei. The first film began filming at Atlanta and East Point, Georgia, in March 2019, and filming wrapped in September 2019. The three films were shot in succession throughout a 106 day shoot. The trilogy was released in July 2021 on Netflix. Natalia Winkelman described the trilogy as "Scream meets Stranger Things built on a supernatural premise sturdy enough to sustain interest and suspense over nearly six hours", in a review for The New York Times. Janiak plans to continue with the franchise and create a larger Fear Street Universe.

On July 19, 2021, it was announced that Janiak was set to direct two episodes of the upcoming crime drama miniseries The Staircase. Antonio Campos began developing the project in 2008, and it was announced in 2019 that Annapurna Television was bringing it into development. The series was shot in 2021 in Atlanta, GA, and Janiak was brought on to direct two episodes. She directed episode 5, "The Beating Heart", and episode 6, "Red in Tooth and Claw". On May 5, 2022, the series premiered on HBO Max. The series was well received by audiences and critics, earning nominations from the Hollywood Critics Association TV Awards, the Primetime Emmy Awards, and Television Critics Association Awards.

== Style and tone ==
Janiak's directing style differs from film to film. In Honeymoon, the film is steeped in sepia tones and all colors are desaturated. The idea and tone for the film were inspired by Invasion of the Body Snatchers. The film heavily relies on body horror and subverts traditional horror gender roles.

Fear Street: Part One - 1994 paid homage to 90s slasher films like Scream and I Know What You Did Last Summer. The film mirrors the tone of these films with its sense of humor and cinematography, as the film is shot in a studio style similar to 90s slasher films. The murder of Maya Hawke as the character of Heather in Fear Street: Part One - 1994 is a nod to Drew Barrymore's death as Casey in the original Scream Film. There is also a recreation of a scene in Scream where students make jokes about the murder featured in Fear Street: Part One - 1994 where a student dons a skull-mask killer mask rather than a ghost-face killer mask. The film also employs some of the graphic violence that is portrayed in 90s slasher films, and adopts a 90s aesthetic in its settings through the use of the soft glow of neon lights in the Shadyside mall, as well as in its soundtrack. Janiak used Kate's death in the first film as a way of lulling the audience into a false sense of safety as she dies late in the film and has the most violent death in the entire trilogy. Kate and Simon's death allow the audience to experience "real loss" that allows the series to propel forward.

Fear Street: Part Two - 1978 pays homage slashers of the 70s, such as Friday the 13th (franchise), changing the setting from a mall to summer camp. Fear Street: Part Two - 1978 filmed the camp sections at Camp Rutlege, which was across from Camp Daniel Morgan, a shooting location for Friday the 13th Part VI: Jason Lives. The camp setting is a direct homage to Friday the 13th. Fear Street: Part Two - 1978 takes on a voyeuristic tone, similar to 70s slashers in its cinematography as the viewer often watches how the events of the film unfold from outside of a window or hidden in the trees through a handheld camera. Fear Street: Part Two - 1978 was the last movie to be filmed in the entire trilogy, which is why the tone varies so much from the first film and the second half of the last film. Because of this, Janiak decided to up the violence and blood.

Unlike the first two installments, Fear Street: Part Three - 1666 does not pay homage to horror icons, but to The New World. The first half of the film shows the dissolution and decay of a settlement. The scenes are shot in a desaturated color palette and are shot on a handheld camera to emulate the time period. The film also uses a lot of natural lighting to help set the tone. The film then jumps back to 1994, assuming the 90s aesthetic once again.

== Themes ==
Honeymoon discusses the concept of identity throughout the film. It relates to human fears by focusing on themes of losing loved ones, breaking trust, isolation, and losing one's identity.

The Fear Street Trilogy allowed Janiak to create a horror film that told the stories of outsiders. The film's main characters are a lesbian couple, allowing the film to discuss homophobia in a horror film as the queer characters are typically killed off early in horror films. The Fear Street Trilogy also discusses themes like police brutality and the planting of evidence through the interactions between Martin and Sheriff Goode. Goode abuses his power as police chief in order to achieve his goals. This end reveal is Janiak's commentary about oppression by the powerful to maintain their status, rather than taking accountability for their own shortcomings. The characters who prevail in the end symbolize uniqueness and greatness being triumphant.

The film comments on classism and socioeconomic inequality through the contrast between Shadyside and Sunnyvale. Shadyside is considered lower-class and earns the moniker of "murder capital of the United States." Meanwhile, residents of the wealthier, suburban Sunnyvale remain largely untouched by violence. The film explores love and its struggle to overcome these systemic divisions through the relationships between Deena and Sam, then Ziggy and Nick in Fear Street Part 2.

== Personal life ==
Janiak married fellow filmmaker Ross Duffer in Palm Springs, California, in December 2015. The couple met in 2006 at a production company in Los Angeles, where Janiak was an assistant to the producer and Duffer was an intern. In February 2024, Janiak filed for divorce from Duffer after eight years of marriage.

== Filmography ==
Film

Year	Title	Director	Writer	Executive Producer
2014	Honeymoon	Yes	Yes	No
2021	Fear Street Part One: 1994	Yes	Yes	Yes
2021	Fear Street Part Two: 1978	Yes	Yes	Yes
2021	Fear Street Part Three: 1666	Yes	Yes	Yes
2025	Fear Street: Prom Queen	No	No	Yes

Television

Year	Title	Episode(s)
2015–16	Scream	"In the Trenches"
2015–16	Scream	"The Orphanage"
2016	Outcast	"The Damage Done"
2018	Panic	"Pilot" (Also executive producer)
2022	The Staircase	"The Beating Heart"
2022	The Staircase	"Red in Tooth and Claw"
