= Jordana Spiro =

American actress, director, and writer

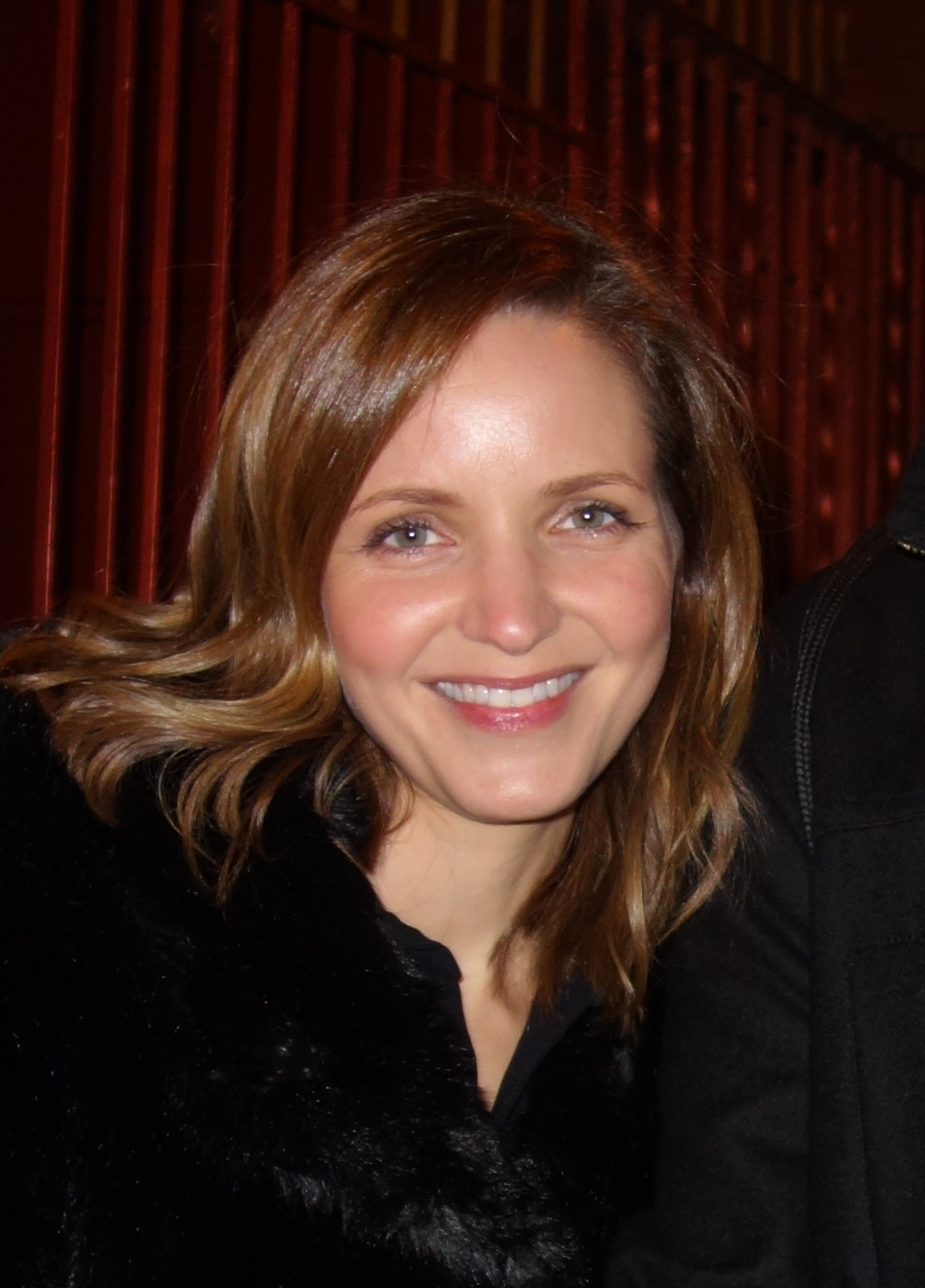
- Spiro in December 2016
- Born: New York City, New York, U.S.
- Education: Circle in the Square Theatre; Royal Academy of Dramatic Art; Columbia University
- Occupation: Actress
- Years active: 1995–present
- Spouse: Matthew Spitzer
- Children: 1

Jordana Spiro is an American actress, director, and writer. As an actress, she has starred in numerous films and television series including Netflix's Ozark and TBS comedy television program My Boys.

Her debut feature Night Comes On, which she directed and co-wrote (with Angelica Nwandu) premiered at the Sundance Film Festival in 2018. She developed the film at the Sundance Institute's Directors, Screenwriters, and Composers Labs, and through a Cinereach development grant. Her short Skin premiered at Sundance and won the Women In Film Productions award. Skin also won the Honorable Mention Award at SXSW, showed at Telluride, Palm Springs, and AFI among others. Spiro earned her MFA in Film from Columbia University in 2015 and received the Adrienne Shelly Foundation Fellowship. She studied drama at the Circle in the Square Theatre School in New York and was selected to join the Berlinale Talent Campus in Berlin.

== Early life and education ==
Spiro was born and raised in New York City. She is Jewish. Spiro has a brother and three sisters. She studied at the Circle in the Square Theatre School and briefly attended the Royal Academy of Dramatic Art in London. In fall 2009, she began the MFA Program in Filmmaking at Columbia University. She finished the degree in 2015. Spiro currently splits her time between Los Angeles and New York.

== Career ==
Spiro's first film role was as Catherine Reece in the 1999 film, From Dusk Till Dawn 3: The Hangman's Daughter, a direct-to-DVD prequel to the 1996 film From Dusk till Dawn.

In 2000 Spiro starred in her first TV series, the USA crime drama The Huntress. Co-star Annette O'Toole and Spiro played mother and daughter bounty hunters, based on the lives of Dottie And Brandi Thorson. The series ran for 28 episodes, concluding in 2001.

Spiro starred in the TBS original comedy series My Boys. She played the role of P.J., a twenty-something "guy's girl", and sports reporter who tries to find romance within her world that is dominated by male friends. The series wrapped its fourth and final season on TBS in 2010.

Spiro also appeared in the 2009 comedy The Goods: Live Hard, Sell Hard alongside Jeremy Piven, Ed Helms and Rob Riggle, and produced by Will Ferrell and Adam McKay. The Goods was directed by Neal Brennan.

Additional credits include The Year of Getting to Know Us, which premiered at the 2008 Sundance film festival, IFC's Alone with Her, as well as guest appearances on Cold Case, Out of Practice, and CSI: NY.

Spiro was scheduled to star in the planned 2010–11 television series Love Bites, but fell out of the role in June 2010 due to other contractual obligations. Spiro was also cast alongside Nicolas Cage and Nicole Kidman in the thriller, Trespass. She was a guest star on the Showtime 2011 season of Dexter. For the 2012–13 season, she had the lead role in the Fox-TV medical/crime drama The Mob Doctor.

Spiro starred as Rachel Garrison in the Netflix crime drama Ozark (2017-2022).

In February 2024, Spiro joined the cast of Law & Order: Special Victims Unit as Shannah Sykes, an FBI agent on loan to the titular police squad.

== Personal life ==
She is married to Matthew Spitzer with whom she has a daughter.

== Filmography ==
=== Film ===
| Year | Title | Role | Notes |
|---|---|---|---|
| 1999 | From Dusk till Dawn 3: The Hangman's Daughter | Catherine Reece | |
| 2003 | Playas Ball | Tonya Jenkins | |
| 2004 | The Greener Grass | Heather | |
| 2005 | Must Love Dogs | Sherry | |
| 2005 | Partner(s) | Anne | |
| 2006 | Alone with Her | Jen | |
| 2006 | Argo | Becca | Short film |
| 2007 | Living & Dying | Mary Jane | |
| 2007 | Resigned | Alison | Short film |
| 2008 | The Year of Getting to Know Us | Kim Temple | |
| 2009 | The Goods: Live Hard, Sell Hard | Ivy Selleck | |
| 2011 | Trespass | Petal | |
| 2019 | To the Stars | Francie Deerborne | |
| 2021 | Fear Street Part One: 1994 | Mrs. Lane | |
| 2021 | Fear Street Part Two: 1978 | Nurse Mary Lane | |
| 2021 | Fear Street Part Three: 1666 | The Widow / Mrs. Lane | |
| 2021 | Small Engine Repair | Karen Delgado | |

=== Television ===
| Year | Title | Role | Notes |
|---|---|---|---|
| 1995 | Maybe This Time | Chase | Episode: "The Other Mother" |
| 1996 | Her Last Chance | Waitress | TV movie |
| 1996 | If These Walls Could Talk | Alison (segment "1974") | TV movie |
| 1997 | Buffy the Vampire Slayer | Callie Anderson | Episode: "Reptile Boy" |
| 1998 | Beverly Hills, 90210 | Carrie Knox | Episode: "Dealer's Choice" |
| 1998 | City Guys | Zoey | Episode: "A Guy and a Goth" |
| 1998 | Silk Stalkings | Freddie Benton | Episode: "Rage" |
| 1998 | One World | Alex | 3 episodes |
| 1999 | Undressed | Merrith | 3 episodes |
| 2000–2001 | The Huntress | Brandi Thorson | 28 episodes |
| 2004 | Beck and Call | Jemma | TV movie |
| 2005 | CSI: NY | Tavia Greenburg | Episode: "Tanglewood" |
| 2005 | Cold Case | Suzanne | Episode: "Revolution" |
| 2005 | JAG | Navy Lt. Catherine Graves | 3 episodes |
| 2005 | Out of Practice | Bianca/Roberta | 2 episodes |
| 2006 | Kitchen Confidential | Alison | Episode: "Praise Be Praise" |
| 2006–2010 | My Boys | P.J. Franklin | 49 episodes |
| 2011 | Harry's Law | Rachael Miller | 7 episodes |
| 2011 | Dexter | Beth Dorsey | 2 episodes |
| 2011 | Lost and Found | Jo | TV movie |
| 2012–2013 | The Mob Doctor | Dr. Grace Devlin | 13 episodes |
| 2013–2014 | The Good Wife | Detective Jenna Villette | 4 episodes |
| 2014 | Tyrant | Dana | Episode: "Pilot" |
| 2015–2016 | Royal Pains | Jen | 3 episodes |
| 2015–2016, 2020 | Blindspot | Sarah Weller | 11 episodes |
| 2016 | The Wilding | Margaret Hayes | TV movie |
| 2017–2018, 2022 | Ozark | Rachel Garrison | 24 episodes |
| 2020 | Evil | Ema Serpagli | Episode: "Justice x 2" |
| 2022, 2024 | Law & Order: Special Victims Unit | Delia Hackman / Special Agent Shannah Sykes | 6 episodes |
| 2025 | Criminal Minds: Evolution | Tessa Lebrun | Episode: The Disciple |
| 2025 | The Savant | TBA | Upcoming miniseries |
