= Honeymoon (2014 film) =

- Theatrical release poster
- Directed by: Leigh Janiak
- Written by: Phil Graziadei; Leigh Janiak
- Story by: Leigh Janiak
- Produced by: Patrick Baker; Esmé Howard
- Starring: Rose Leslie; Harry Treadaway
- Cinematography: Kyle Klutz
- Edited by: Christopher S. Capp
- Music by: Heather McIntosh
- Production company: Fewlas Entertainment
- Distributed by: Magnolia Pictures
- Release dates: March 7, 2014 (SXSW); September 12, 2014 (United States)
- Running time: 87 minutes
- Country: United States
- Language: English
- Box office: $24,343

Honeymoon is a 2014 American supernatural horror film directed by Leigh Janiak in her feature directorial debut, from a screenplay by Janiak and Phil Graziadei. It stars Rose Leslie and Harry Treadaway as a newly married couple whose honeymoon ends up being plagued by a series of strange events. The film had its world premiere on March 7, 2014, at South by Southwest, and was theatrically released by Magnolia Pictures on September 12, 2014.

== Plot ==
Newlyweds Bea and Paul spend their honeymoon at Bea's family's cabin in a secluded Canadian forest. In a small restaurant, they meet the owner Will, Bea's childhood friend. Will's wife Annie interrupts their conversation, saying they need to get away. That night, Paul wakes up to find Bea missing. He finds her naked and disoriented in the woods and takes her back to the cabin. Bea claims she was sleepwalking due to stress, which unsettles Paul as Bea doesn't have a history of sleepwalking.

Over subsequent days, Bea seemingly forgets how to do several basic tasks, but insists she is fine. Paul sees her practicing conversations alone and struggling to remember common words. One night, Paul is disturbed by bright lights shining through their bedroom window but cannot find its source. He returns to where he found Bea the night she vanished and finds her gown covered in a mysterious goo. Despite her repeated denials, Paul concludes that Will is responsible and goes to confront him.

Outside the restaurant, Paul sees Annie, who exhibits similar behavior to Bea and bears identical marks on her thighs. Annie claims that Will is hiding and again warns Paul to stay away before departing. Paul finds Will's bloody baseball hat floating in the water. He enters their home and finds several pages of notes describing basic details about Annie, including her and Will's names, along with security camera footage of Annie following the bright lights into the woods.

Paul discovers that Bea has taken similar notes, and accuses her of being someone else. She locks herself in the bathroom, and when Paul breaks in he finds her repeatedly stabbing herself in the genitals. Paul ties her to the bed and interrogates her about details of their relationship, most of which she either misremembers or has forgotten. She puts Paul's hand into her vagina and has him remove a large worm-like creature.

Bea explains that the night she disappeared into the woods, she saw the same lights Paul had seen and walked to them. She encountered a group of silhouetted figures who impregnated her with the creature. Bea claims that the figures are taking away what is left of her. Paul scrambles to find their car keys, but she insists that they cannot leave. After a beam of light suddenly appears, she knocks Paul out and takes him into the lake on a boat, fastening an anchor to his legs. He awakens, with Bea explaining that she is protecting him from the figures by "hiding" him under the water. Paul tries to escape, but she throws him overboard.

Bea is shown to be deteriorating with her skin peeling off and her eyes discolored. After watching her and Paul's wedding video, she is met by a similarly-deteriorated Annie, and they walk into the lights together.

== Cast ==
- Rose Leslie as Bea
- Harry Treadaway as Paul
- Ben Huber as Will
- Hanna Brown as Annie

== Production ==
The development of Honeymoon began in 2010, after Janiak viewed Monsters and Tiny Furniture, and she and Phil Graziadei began writing the script in 2012. While writing the film's script, Janiak was inspired by the idea that "Even small moments ... can drive a wedge between people" and, with her writing partner, wondered "how far [they] could push them until they started falling apart." Janiak chose Rose Leslie to play the role of Bea after seeing her performance as Ygritte on Game of Thrones. Principal photography began in spring 2013 and had a limited budget.

== Reception ==
On Rotten Tomatoes, the film holds a rating of 76% based on 58 reviews, with an average rating of 5.80/10. The site's consensus reads, "Smart, stylish, and nail-bitingly tense, Honeymoon packs more slow-building horror than many bigger-budget productions." On Metacritic, the film has an aggregated score of 65 out of 100 based on 10 critic reviews, indicating "generally favorable" reviews.

Ryan Turek of Shock Till You Drop gave Honeymoon a positive review, stating "Janiak demonstrates some wonderfully confident direction for a first-timer, utilizing space, sound design and two very good lead actors as her tools to slowly amplify the tension and mess with your head." Ryland Aldrich of Twitch Film also praised the film and called it "a good story, excellently told, and very, very scary." Mark Kermode of The Observer gave it 3/5 stars, writing, "Wisely withholding its scrungy cross-generic revelations until the final act, co-writer Janiak's directorial debut makes confident use of limited resources to conjure creepy thrills, peering through the cracks in the couple's imploding relationship, spying shadowy monsters lurking in the darkness."

Andy Greene of Pop Insomniacs gave it a mixed review, saying that the film "isn't going to blow your mind, or scare the crap out of you", but added that director Leigh Janiak "is clever enough to bank on these young stars and their explosive chemistry instead." Mike McCahill of The Guardian gave the film a score of 2 stars out of 5, writing: "Co-writer/director Leigh Janiak aims for Lars von Trier's sustained dread, but manages only vague unease."
