= Benjamin Flores Jr. =

American actor and rapper (born 2002)

- Born: Benjamin Christopher Flores Jr. July 24, 2002 (age 24); Memphis, Tennessee, U.S.
- Other names: Lil' P-Nut; BNJII
- Occupations: Actor; rapper
- Years active: 2008–present

Benjamin Christopher Flores Jr. (born July 24, 2002), also known as BNJII (formerly known as Lil' P-Nut), is an American rapper and actor. Beginning as a child actor, Flores starred as Louie Preston in the Nickelodeon television series The Haunted Hathaways (2013–2015), and as Triple G in Game Shakers (2015–2019). Transitioning to dramatic roles, he starred as Eugene Jones in Your Honor as well as Josh in the Fear Street trilogy.

== Life and career ==
=== Music ===
Flores was born Benjamin Christopher Flores Jr. on July 24, 2002, in Memphis, Tennessee. Flores first came to wider notice after he was interviewed by the local Memphis Fox 13 television station at age 7. After that interview, he appeared on The Ellen DeGeneres Show, where he performed his first rap single as Lil' P-Nut, "You Might Be the One for Me"; it was released on September 25, 2010. He then appeared on Cymphonique's song, "All That". His other raps include "Bad Dream" and "Choosin'".

=== Acting ===
Flores appeared in an episode of the TBS sitcom Are We There Yet?, and played Atticus the rapping penguin in the animated film Happy Feet 2, in 2011. He made a cameo appearance in Yo Gotti's music video for "Look In The Mirror". Flores appeared in the film Ride Along, which was released in January 2014.

In 2013, Flores was cast in a starring role on the Nickelodeon television series The Haunted Hathaways, playing Louie, a young ghost that resides in the same house with a living family called the Hathaways. The show ran two seasons before ending in 2015. He was nominated for Favorite TV Actor at the Nickelodeon Kids' Choice Awards in 2014 and 2015 for his role on The Haunted Hathaways.

On July 7, 2015, it was announced that Flores would be co-starring in Dan Schneider's newest TV series, Game Shakers, playing the role of Triple G, the son of famous rapper Double G (Kel Mitchell). Game Shakers ran for three seasons, from 2015 to 2019.

On June 13, 2016, Flores was announced as the new voice of Gerald Johanssen in the television movie Hey Arnold!: The Jungle Movie. In 2017, he had a role in the fantasy-action film Transformers: The Last Knight. In 2018, Flores was cast in the Netflix film Rim of the World, which was released in May 2019. In 2021, he starred as Josh in The Fear Street Trilogy, beginning with Fear Street Part One: 1994; the films were released on Netflix. From 2020 to 2021, he also played Eugene Jones in the Showtime television series Your Honor alongside actors Bryan Cranston and Hunter Doohan.

== Filmography ==
=== Film ===
Year	Title	Role	Notes
2011	Happy Feet Two	Atticus	Voice role; as Benjamin "Lil' P-Nut" Flores Jr.
2014	Ride Along	Morris	As Benjamin "Lil' P-Nut" Flores
2014	Take Me to the River (2014 film)	Himself	As Lil' P-Nut
2014	Santa Hunters	Alex	Television film
2015	One Crazy Cruise	Nate Bauer	Television film
2017	Transformers: The Last Knight	Kid	
2017	Hey Arnold!: The Jungle Movie	Gerald Johanssen	Television film; voice role; as Benjamin "Lil' P-Nut" Flores Jr.
2017	Pup Star: Better 2Gether	M.C. Bite	Voice role; as Benjamin "Lil' P-Nut" Flores Jr.
2019	Rim of the World	Dariush	Direct-to-video film
2021	Fear Street Part One: 1994	Josh	Streaming film
2021	Fear Street Part Two: 1978	Josh	Streaming film
2021	Fear Street Part Three: 1666	Josh	Streaming film
2023	Family Switch	Boss	Streaming film

=== Television ===
Year	Title	Role	Notes
2013–2015	The Haunted Hathaways	Louie Preston	Main role; as Benjamin "Lil' P-Nut" Flores Jr.
2014	The Thundermans	Louie Preston	Crossover episode: "The Haunted Thundermans"
2015–2017	Henry Danger	Lil' Biggie/Triple G	Episodes: "The Beat Goes On" "Danger Games"
2015–2019	Game Shakers	Triple G	Main role; as Benjamin "Lil' P-Nut" Flores Jr.
2018	The Librarians	Freddy	Episode: "And the Hidden Sanctuary"
2020–2022	Jurassic World Camp Cretaceous	Brandon Bowman	8 episodes; voice role
2020–2023	Your Honor	Eugene "Little Man" Jones	Recurring role (season 1); main role (season 2)
2023	Quantum Leap	Dwain	Episode: "One Night in Koreatown"
2024	Jurassic World: Chaos Theory	Brandon Bowman	Episode: "Aftershock"; voice role

== Awards and nominations ==
Year	Award	Category	Work	Result	Refs
2014	Imagen Awards	Favorite Young TV Actor	The Haunted Hathaways	Won	
2014	Kids' Choice Awards	Favorite Young TV Actor	The Haunted Hathaways	Nominated	
2015	Kids' Choice Awards	Favorite Young TV Actor	The Haunted Hathaways	Nominated	
2017	Kids' Choice Awards	Favorite Young TV Actor	Game Shakers	Nominated	
