= Olivia Scott Welch =

American actress

- Occupation: Actress
- Years active: 2009–present

Olivia Scott Welch, also known as Olivia Welch, is an American actress. She portrayed Samantha "Sam" Fraser in the Netflix horror film trilogy Fear Street and Heather Nill in the Prime Video series Panic.

== Life and career ==
At the age of 11, Welch was already taking her first acting classes and during high school, she traveled to Los Angeles on some occasions, participating in series such as Agent Carter and Modern Family. Eventually, after Welch's graduation, she settled in California to pursue a professional career.

In 2019, Welch got the lead role of Sam Fraser in the film trilogy Fear Street, which premiered in July 2021 on Netflix; the story begins in 1994 and focuses on a group of teenagers tormented by a curse and a mystery of more than 300 years that haunts their town, in which current time Sam is persecuted by murderers from different times and Deena seeks to save her from that curse. Welch also starred in the television series Panic as Heather Nill, based on the novel of the same name by Lauren Oliver, which premiered on May 28, 2021, on Amazon Prime Video.

In August 2021, it was reported that Welch had been cast as the lead role in an upcoming film The Blue Rose as Detective Lilly, which is set in the 1950s and mixes various genres such as fiction and horror; the plot is around a pair of young detectives who during an investigation of a homicide case find themselves in a dark alternate reality.

== Filmography ==
=== Film ===
Year	Title	Role	Notes
2020	Shithouse	Jess Malmquist	
2021	Fear Street Part One: 1994	Samantha "Sam"	
2021	Fear Street Part Two: 1978	Samantha "Sam"	
2021	Fear Street Part Three: 1666	Samantha "Sam" Fraser / Hannah Miller	
2023	The Sacrifice Game	Maisie	
2023	The Blue Rose (2023)	Detective Lilly	

=== Television ===
Year	Title	Role	Notes
2015–2016	Modern Family	Olive	2 episodes (Season 7)
2016	Agent Carter	Teenage Agnes Cully	Episode: "Smoke & Mirrors"
2019	Unbelievable	Amelia	2 episodes
2021	Panic	Heather Nill	Lead role, 10 episodes
2023	Lucky Hank	Julie Devereaux	Main cast
