= Kiana Madeira =

Canadian actress (born 1992)

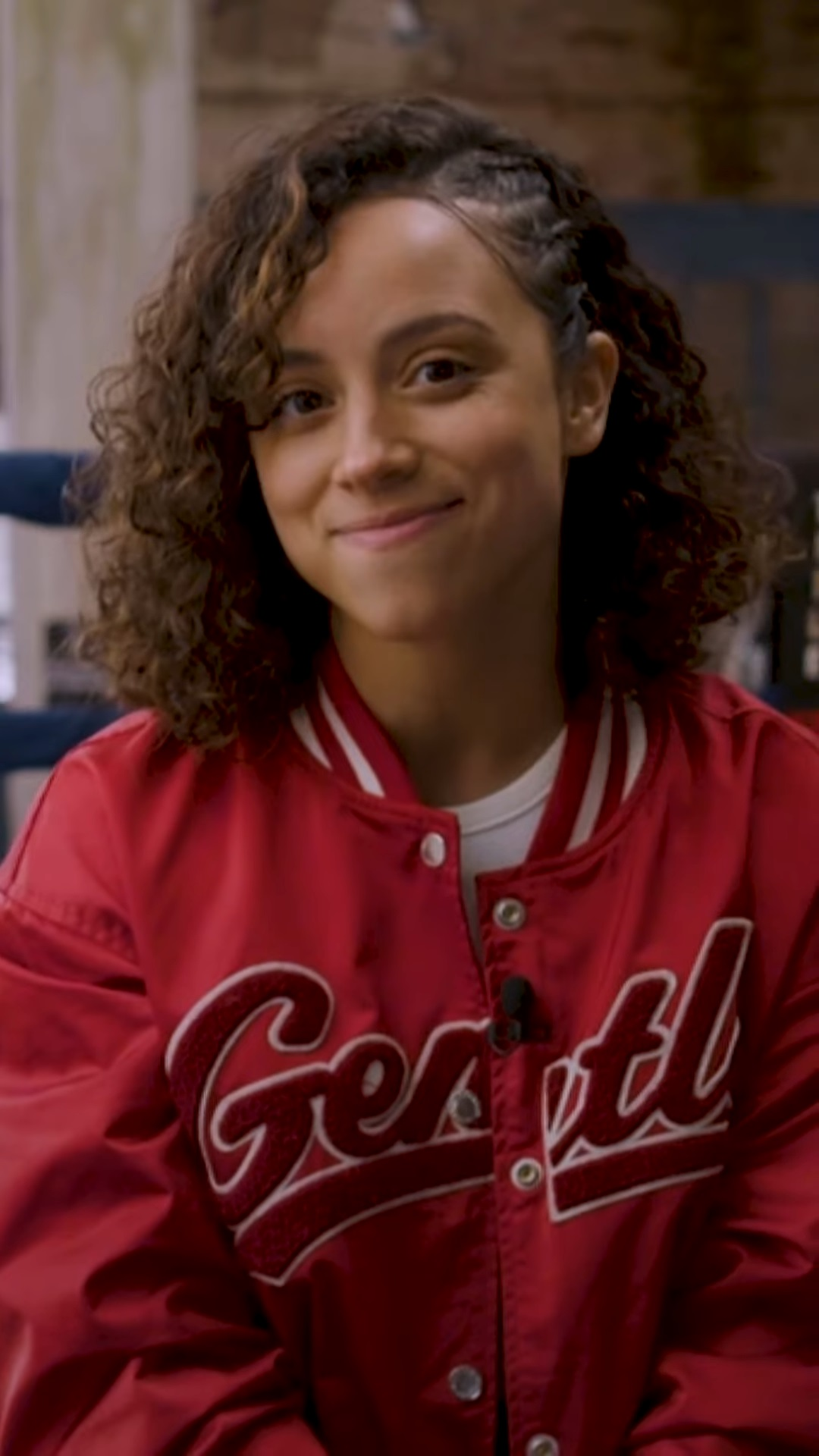
- Madeira in 2023
- Born: November 4, 1992 (age 34); Toronto, Ontario, Canada
- Occupation: Actress
- Years active: 2007–present
- Spouse: Lovell Adams-Gray (m. 2023)

Kiana Madeira (born November 4, 1992) is a Canadian actress, best knowing for playing Moe in the Netflix television series Trinkets and Deena in the 2021 Netflix horror film trilogy Fear Street.

== Early life ==
Kiana Madeira was born on November 4, 1992 in Toronto, Ontario, and grew up in Mississauga, Ontario. She became interested in acting at the age of five, after becoming infatuated with John Travolta in Grease (1978). She is of Portuguese descent on her father's side and of Irish, First Nations, and Black Canadian descent on her mother's side.

== Career ==
In February 2019, Madeira was cast in the lead role of Deena in the Fear Street trilogy films which were released on Netflix in July 2021. In June 2021, it was announced that she will star in a romance-action movie entitled Perfect Addiction opposite Ross Butler. She also started in the new revival of Malcolm in the Middle, titled Malcolm in the Middle: Life's Still Unfair as Tristan, Malcolm's girlfriend.

== Personal life ==
In 2017, Madeira began dating actor Lovell Adams-Gray; they became engaged in 2021. They married in September 2023. She moved to the United States in 2017 for her acting career, but frequently visits Canada and her family.

== Filmography ==
=== Film ===
Year	Title	Role	Notes
2018	Giant Little Ones	Jess	
2018	Level 16	Clara	
2019	She Never Died	Suzzie	
2021	Fear Street Part One: 1994	Deena Johnson	
2021	Fear Street Part Two: 1978	Deena Johnson	
2021	Fear Street Part Three: 1666	Deena Johnson / Sarah Fier	
2021	After We Fell	Nora	
2022	After Ever Happy	Nora	
2023	Brother	Aisha	
2023	Perfect Addiction	Sienna Lane	
2023	After Everything	Nora	
2024	Morningside	Nicki	
2026	Beware Boiúna	Lena	

=== Television ===
Year	Title	Role	Notes
2007	Little Mosque on the Prairie	Halaqa Teen #2	Episode: "Best Intentions"
2010	Harriet the Spy: Blog Wars	Rachel Hennessy	Television film
2011	Salem Falls	Isobel	Television film
2011	My Babysitter's a Vampire	Hannah Price	Episode: "Double Negative"
2011–13	Really Me	Julia Wilson	Main role
2014	One Christmas Eve	Maritza	Television film
2015	Bad Hair Day	Sierra	Television film
2016	The Swap	Sassy Gaines	Television film
2016	The Night Before Halloween	Lindsay	Television film
2016	Bruno & Boots: Go Jump in the Pool!	Diane Grant	Television film
2016	The Other Kingdom	Mindy	Episode: "The New Kid"
2016	Conviction	Cindy Rosario	Episode: Pilot
2017	Neverknock	Amy	Television film
2017	Bruno & Boots: This Can't Be Happening in Macdonald Hall	Diane Grant	Television film
2017	Bruno & Boots: The Wizzle War	Diane Grant	Television film
2017	Dark Matter	Lyra	Episode: "It Doesn't Have to Be Like This"
2017	Wynonna Earp	Poppy	Episode: "Whiskey Lullaby"
2017	Barbelle	Brooklyn	2 episodes
2018	Sacred Lies	Angel Trujillo	Main role
2018	Taken	Amy	Episode: "Render"
2018	The Flash	Spencer Young	Episode: "News Flash"
2019	Coroner	Amanda Reyes	2 episodes
2019–2020	Trinkets	Moe Truax	Main role
2024–present	My Adventures with Superman	Kara Zor-El / Supergirl	Voice; 14 episodes
2026	Malcolm in the Middle: Life's Still Unfair	Tristan	Miniseries (4 episodes)
