= Los Angeles State Historic Park =

State historic park in Los Angeles County, California, United States

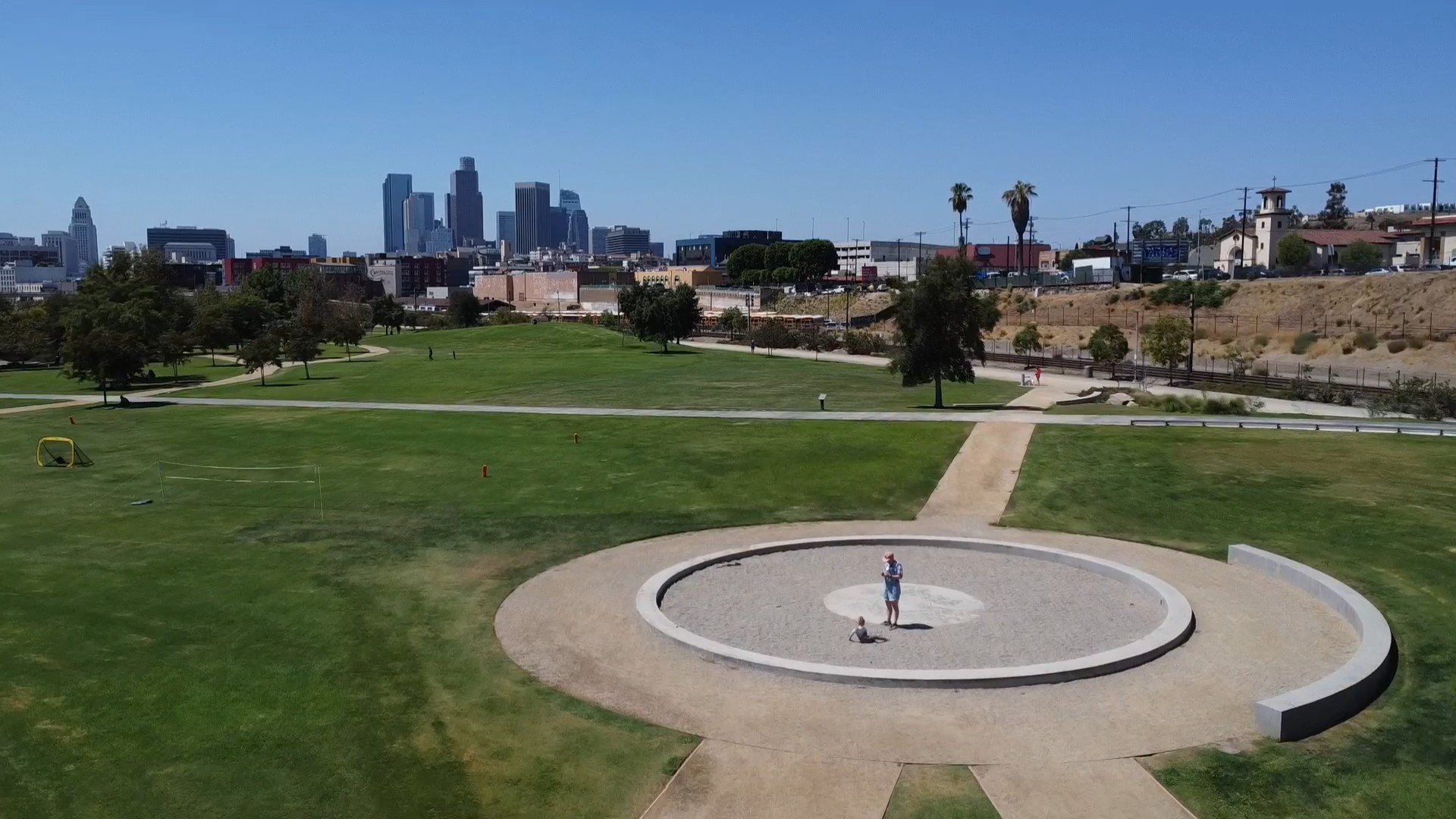
- An 2022 aerial view

- Location within California Location within the United States
- Location: Los Angeles County, California
- Nearest city: Los Angeles, California
- Coordinates: 34°3′58″N 118°14′4″W
- Area: 32 acres (13 ha)
- Established: 2001
- Governing body: California Department of Parks and Recreation

Los Angeles State Historic Park, also known as LA Historic Park and the Cornfield, is a California State Park in the Chinatown neighborhood of Los Angeles. The former rail yard and brownfield consists of a long open space between Spring Street and the tracks of the Los Angeles Metro A Line.

== History ==
This former site of the Southern Pacific Transportation Company's River Station (1876−1901) is considered the "Ellis Island of Los Angeles" where new arrivals from the East first disembarked. Corn leaking from train cars and sprouting along the tracks gave rise to the nickname The Cornfield. The 32-acre (13 ha) site was established as a California state park in 2001.

== Park development ==
In 2001, a 5-foot section (1.5 m) of the historical Zanja Madre irrigation canal was uncovered. In 2005, the former industrial site was transformed into a productive cornfield for one season as an art project called "Not a Cornfield."

In 2006, a contest was held in conjunction with the California State Parks Foundation to select a design for the park. The preliminary park opened on September 23 of the same year. Hargreaves and Associates of San Francisco won the competition.

Development of the park has been slow. California's budget deficit forced officials to scale back plans for the park in 2010, earmarking $18 million instead of the planned $55 million. Plans for a bridge, water fountain, theme gardens, an upscale restaurant, as well as an ecology center with restored wetlands were tabled. The tabled features may be added later if funding becomes available. The park opened with a campfire circle, restrooms and parking lot.

Numerous community fairs and gatherings have been held in the park. It also contains several plaques that relate the history of the Cornfield, Chinatown and Downtown Los Angeles.

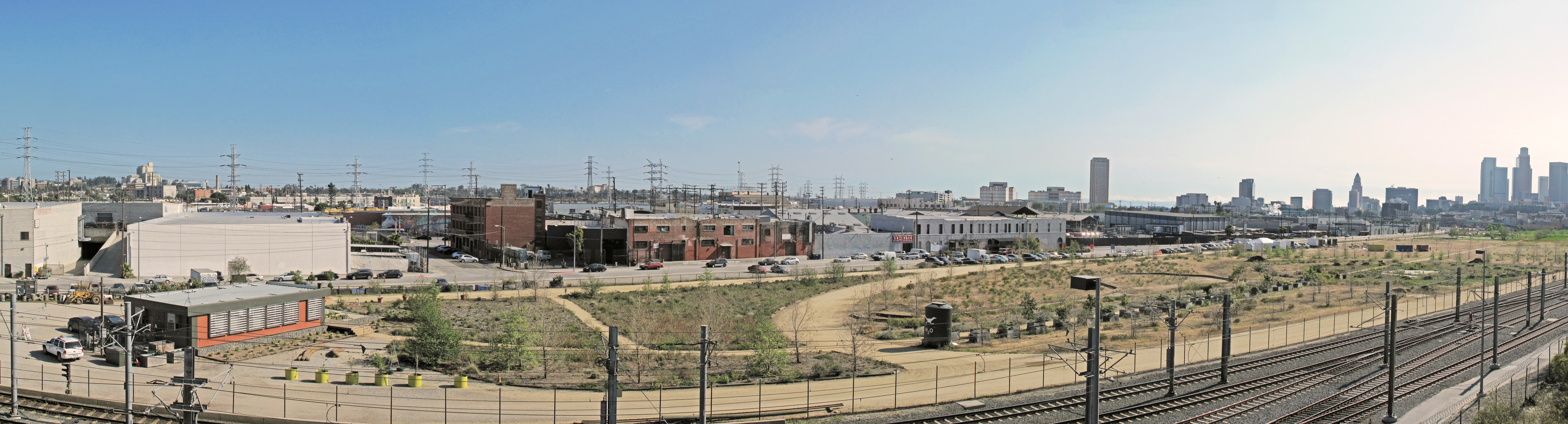
Los Angeles State Historic Park in 2012

== See also ==
- List of California state parks
