= Shelby Oaks (soundtrack) =

2025 film soundtrack album

Shelby Oaks (Original Motion Picture Soundtrack)

Film score by James Burkholder and the Newton Brothers
- Released: October 31, 2025
- Recorded: 2024–2025
- Genre: Film score
- Length: 53:43
- Label: Lakeshore

James Burkholder chronology
Werewolves (2024)	Shelby Oaks (2024)

The Newton Brothers chronology
Fear Street: Prom Queen (2025)	Shelby Oaks (2025)	Five Nights at Freddy's 2 (2025)

Shelby Oaks (Original Motion Picture Soundtrack) is the film score to the 2024 film Shelby Oaks directed by Chris Stuckmann in his directorial debut. The score is composed by James Burkholder and the Newton Brothers and released through Lakeshore Records on October 31, 2025, coinciding Halloween.

== Development ==
In July 2024, it was announced that James Burkholder and the Newton Brothers would jointly compose the score for Shelby Oaks. Burkholder was mentored by the musical duo, whom he worked on several projects as an additional composer and arranger. He was initially announced as the solo composer for the film, and provided the first cut during January 2023, and as the film underwent a year-long post-production since then, the final edit which he provided to Burkholder was different from the first cut he saw. Upon executive producer Mike Flanagan's influence, the Newton Brothers joined as co-composers, as he had recurrently worked with them on several projects.

Burkolder noted that working with the duo provided him a collaborative effort between them as it provided a unique musical design. He found the film to be a unique challenge as it blends found footage, mockumentary and narrative storytelling. He didn't have a lot of experience working on films that bounce between genres but found it to be "super fun" as he could consistently collaborate with the composers on those films and sonically delineate the different genres. Referencing a scene where Mia (Sullivan) goes to prison, which was a pivotal moment, he noted that he went through different iterations of the score but also managed to maintain jumpscares and creepiness throughout the music.

For the library scene, he initially composed a music piece but as the scene was edited and modified due to its length, the producers demanded a new musical piece; he considered rescoring that piece to be fun, as it was a different version, and he went ahead with the new approach. The piece he scored for the initial sequence featured in the end credits. Aaron J. Morton, who worked with Stuckmann in his short films and home features, had composed a piece titled "Big Sister" written by Jordan Hehl and performed by Annie Ellicott.

== Release ==
Dennis Harvey of Variety wrote "A loud score attributed to both James Burkholder and The Newton Brothers keeps telling us to be very, very frightened." Mark Keizer of MovieWeb wrote "composers James Burkholder and The Newton Brothers still manage to provide some pro-level below-the-line polish". Brandon Wainerdi of Fangoria wrote "The score, from The Newton Brothers (Midnight Mass, X-Men '97) and James Burkholder (Goosebumps), also possesses that same new nostalgia energy. It's not a Carpenter-inspired score — it's something "fresher," reminiscent of the more sweeping scores of a slightly different era. None of it feels forced or hackneyed, though, and the movie remains taut, scary, and interesting throughout its 99-minute runtime."

Joe Lipsett of Bloody Disgusting called it "a discordant score". Chris Bumbray of JoBlo.com wrote "The movie does benefit from a polished score by [James Burkholder] and The Newton Brothers". J Hurtado of ScreenAnarchy wrote "composers The Newton Brothers [and James Burkholder] bring their A-game to this relatively small film". Jake Kleinman of Polygon and Richard Lawson of The Hollywood Reporter called it as "exciting" and "thrilling".

== Track listing ==
No.	Title	Length
1.	"Not Safe Here"	0:57
2.	"Missing for a Week"	1:21
3.	"Paranormal Paranoids"	0:57
4.	"Publicity Stunt"	1:29
5.	"The Theme Park"	1:18
6.	"The Perpetrator"	0:58
7.	"Man in the Window"	2:58
8.	"Shelby Oaks"	2:03
9.	"The Tape"	2:05
10.	"Taking of Riley Brennan"	1:12
11.	"Biggest Fan"	1:27
12.	"Closeup"	0:43
13.	"The Library, Pt. 1"	1:27
14.	"Wilson Miles"	1:44
15.	"Down Boy"	1:55
16.	"Reunion"	1:30
17.	"Sticks and Stones"	2:03
18.	"The Timing"	2:00
19.	"Hard to Break"	4:45
20.	"Shield This Cambion"	5:23
21.	"Lost and Found"	1:11
22.	"Finally Over"	1:04
23.	"Tooth Will Rend"	2:01
24.	"The Library, Pt. 2"	2:39
25.	"Big Sister" (Annie Ellicott, Aaron J. Morton and Jordan Hehl)	3:21
26.	"Sisters Theme / End Credits"	5:12
Total length:		53:43
