= Fear Street (film series) =

Horror film franchise

- Official film series logo
- Created by: R. L. Stine (Book series)
- Original work: Fear Street
- Owner: Chernin Entertainment
- Years: 2021–present

Films and television
- Films: Fear Street Part One: 1994 (2021); Fear Street Part Two: 1978 (2021); Fear Street Part Three: 1666 (2021); Fear Street: Prom Queen (2025)

Audio
- Soundtracks: Fear Street Part One: 1994 (2021); Fear Street Part Two: 1978 (2021); Fear Street Part Three: 1666 (2021); Fear Street: Prom Queen (2025)

Fear Street is a series of American horror films based on R. L. Stine's book series of the same name. Involving slasher and supernatural elements, the films' overall story revolves around teenagers who work to break the curse that has been over their town for hundreds of years. The first three installments were directed by Leigh Janiak from scripts and stories she co-wrote with other contributors, while the fourth film was directed by Matt Palmer from a script he co-wrote with Donald McLeary.

Produced by Chernin Entertainment and distributed by Netflix, the first three films were shot back-to-back, and were released on a weekly basis as Netflix Original Films in July 2021 to positive reviews. The fourth film, Fear Street: Prom Queen, was released in May 2025.

== Development ==
In October 1997, Hollywood Pictures struck a deal to acquire the Fear Street series of books, which were set to be developed with Parachute Entertainment as a Scream-like feature franchise. Developments never materialized.

In October 2015, a film based on Stine's Fear Street series was being developed by 20th Century Fox and Chernin Entertainment. In February 2017, it was reported that Kyle Killen would write the script for the film. In July, the adaptation was announced as a trilogy, with Leigh Janiak directing, and rewriting the script with her partner Phil Graziadei. Zak Olkewicz was also drafting a script. The films were to be shot back to back, with the intention of releasing them to theaters one month apart. Janiak describes the format as a "hybrid of traditional television content and movies", with each installment intended to both have a satisfying ending and connecting to the larger story.

The series was reported to be centered around a young lesbian couple, navigating their rocky relationship when they are targeted by horrors in their small town. In March 2019, filming began in Atlanta and East Point, Georgia, with some parts filmed at Hard Labor Creek State Park in Rutledge in August 2019. The shoot lasted for 106 days, wrapping in September 2019.

In April 2020, Chernin Entertainment ended their distribution deal with 20th Century and made a multi-year first-look deal with Netflix, resulting in the latter distributing the trilogy.

== Films ==
Film	U.S. release date	Director	Screenwriters	Story by	Producers
Fear Street Part One: 1994	July 2, 2021	Leigh Janiak	Leigh Janiak & Phil Graziadei	Leigh Janiak, Phil Graziadei & Kyle Killen	Peter Chernin, Jenno Topping, and David Ready
Fear Street Part Two: 1978	July 9, 2021	Leigh Janiak	Leigh Janiak & Zak Olkewicz	Leigh Janiak, Phil Graziadei & Zak Olkewicz	Peter Chernin, Jenno Topping, and David Ready
Fear Street Part Three: 1666	July 16, 2021	Leigh Janiak	Leigh Janiak, Phil Graziadei & Kate Trefry	Leigh Janiak, Phil Graziadei & Kate Trefry	Peter Chernin, Jenno Topping, and David Ready
Fear Street: Prom Queen	May 23, 2025	Matt Palmer	Matt Palmer & Donald McLeary	Matt Palmer & Donald McLeary	Peter Chernin, Jenno Topping and Kori Adelson

=== Fear Street Part One: 1994 (2021) ===
After a series of brutal slayings, a group of teenagers take on an evil force that has plagued their notorious town for centuries.

The film was released on July 2, 2021. Janiak describes it as influenced by 1990s slasher films, especially Scream.

=== Fear Street Part Two: 1978 (2021) ===
In the cursed town of Shadyside, a killer's murder spree terrorizes Camp Nightwing and turns a summer of fun into a gruesome fight for survival.

The film was released on July 9, 2021. Janiak states that she was influenced by Friday the 13th.

=== Fear Street Part Three: 1666 (2021) ===
Thrust back to 1666, Deena learns the truth about Sarah Fier. Back in 1994, the friends fight for their lives — and Shadyside’s future.

The film was released on July 16, 2021. Janiak compares it to The New World.

=== Fear Street: Prom Queen (2025) ===
In July 2021, director Leigh Janiak expressed interest in expanding the film series beyond the trilogy of movies. She had stated to be interested in adapting a slasher film that takes place during the 1950s and centers on Harry Rooker / The Milkman. Cast members similarly expressed interest in returning.

In July 2022, Stine stated that there are discussions ongoing for additional films being developed in the series. Later that month, Bloody Disgusting confirmed this statement with Netflix, stating that official plans would be announced in the future. By December, it was announced that Chloe Okuno will serve as director on the next Fear Street installment, and that Chernin Entertainment would return as one of the production studios. By October 2023, Stine stated that the film series will continue with additional Fear Street installments in development. In November of the same year, Scott Stuber, Head of Film at Netflix, confirmed a fourth Fear Street film was being written. In January 2024, Stine announced that the next movie would be an adaptation of his novel The Prom Queen from the original Fear Street book series. In March 2024, the project was officially announced with the title of Fear Street: Prom Queen. Matt Palmer will direct the film, from a script he co-wrote with Donald McLeary. The plot will take place during 1988: during prom season, the girls of Shadyside High compete for dance royalty, though everything changes when an outsider joins the competition and, one by one, people begin disappearing. The cast was announced to star India Fowler, Suzanna Son, Fina Strazza, David Iacono, Ella Rubin, Chris Klein, Lili Taylor and Katherine Waterston.

The film was released on May 23, 2025. Janiak compares it to Carrie.

=== Future ===
In January 2025, Stine announced that three additional movies were in development, stating that unnamed screenwriters were writing their respective scripts.

== Recurring cast and characters ==
List indicators

This section includes characters who will appear or have appeared in more than two films in the series.

- An empty grey cell indicates the character was not in the film, or that the character's official presence has not yet been confirmed.
- ^{A} indicates an appearance through archival footage or audio.
- ^{C} indicates a cameo role.
- ^{O} indicates an older version of the character.
- ^{Y} indicates a younger version of the character.

Character	Films		
Character	The Fear Street Trilogy		
Character	Fear Street Part One: 1994	Fear Street Part Two: 1978	Fear Street Part Three: 1666
Character	2021		
Deena Johnson	Kiana Madeira	Kiana Madeira	Kiana Madeira
Sam Fraser	Olivia Scott Welch	Olivia Scott Welch	Olivia Scott Welch
Josh Johnson	Benjamin Flores Jr.	Benjamin Flores Jr.	Benjamin Flores Jr.
Nick Goode	Ashley Zukerman	Ted Sutherland^{Y} Ashley Zukerman^{O}^{C}	Ashley Zukerman^{O} Ted Sutherland^{Y}^{A}
C. Berman Christine "Ziggy" Berman	Gillian Jacobs^{O}^{C}	Sadie Sink^{Y} Gillian Jacobs^{O}	Gillian Jacobs^{O} Sadie Sink^{Y}^{A}
Sarah Fier	Elizabeth Scopel^{C}	Elizabeth Scopel^{C}	Elizabeth Scopel Kiana Madeira
Nurse Mary Lane	Jordana Spiro	Jordana Spiro	Jordana Spiro
Ruby Lane	Jordyn DiNatale	Jordyn DiNatale	Jordyn DiNatale
Kate Schmidt	Julia Rehwald	Julia Rehwald^{A}	Julia Rehwald^{A}
Simon Kalivoda	Fred Hechinger	Fred Hechinger^{A}	Fred Hechinger^{A}
Martin P. Franklin	Darrell Britt-Gibson		Darrell Britt-Gibson
Heather Watkins	Maya Hawke	Maya Hawke^{A}	Maya Hawke^{A}
Ryan Torres Skull Mask	David W. Thompson	David W. Thompson^{A}	David W. Thompson^{A}
Mrs. Fraser	Lacey Camp		Lacey Camp
Cindy Berman		Emily Rudd	Emily Rudd^{A}
Alice Hart		Ryan Simpkins	Ryan Simpkins^{A}
Tommy Slater The Nightwing Killer	McCabe Slye^{A}	McCabe Slye	McCabe Slye^{A}
Sheila Watson		Chiara Aurelia	Chiara Aurelia^{A}
Arnie		Sam Brooks	Sam Brooks^{A}
Joan		Jacqi Vené	Jacqi Vené^{A}
Will Goode	Matthew Zuk	Brandon Spink^{Y} Matthew Zuk^{O}^{C}	Matthew Zuk
Cyrus Miller The Pastor	Michael Chandler^{A}		Michael Chandler

== Release ==
The first film was scheduled to be released theatrically in June 2020, but was pulled from the schedule because of the COVID-19 pandemic. In April 2020, Chernin Entertainment ended their distribution deal with 20th Century Studios and made a multi-year first-look deal with Netflix. By August 2020, Netflix had acquired the distribution rights to the Fear Street trilogy. The films were released exclusively as Netflix Original Films.

In May 2021, the official trailer released by Netflix announced the respective films' credits, release dates, and official titles, as: Fear Street: Part One – 1994, Fear Street: Part Two – 1978, and Fear Street: Part Three – 1666. The trilogy of films is R-rated, with original novel series writer R. L. Stine praising the direction and adaptations of his books.

The films were released over a three-week span: July 2, July 9, and July 16.

== Additional crew and production details ==
Film	Composers	Cinematographer	Editor	Production companies	Distributing company	Running time
Fear Street Part One: 1994	Marco Beltrami & Marcus Trumpp	Caleb Heymann	Rachel Goodlett Katz	Chernin Entertainment; Netflix Original Films	Netflix	1 hr 47 mins
Fear Street Part Two: 1978	Marco Beltrami & Brandon Roberts	Caleb Heymann	Rachel Goodlett Katz	Chernin Entertainment; Netflix Original Films	Netflix	1 hr 50 mins
Fear Street Part Three: 1666	Marco Beltrami, Marcus Trumpp & Anna Drubich	Caleb Heymann	Rachel Goodlett Katz	Chernin Entertainment; Netflix Original Films	Netflix	1 hr 53 mins
Fear Street: Prom Queen	The Newton Brothers	Márk Györi	Christopher Donaldson	Chernin Entertainment, Netflix Original Films	Netflix	1 hr 30 mins

== Reception ==
=== Critical and public response ===
Film	Rotten Tomatoes	Metacritic
Fear Street Part One: 1994	84% (116 reviews)	67 (20 reviews)
Fear Street Part Two: 1978	88% (109 reviews)	61 (16 reviews)
Fear Street Part Three: 1666	89% (99 reviews)	68 (15 reviews)
Fear Street: Prom Queen	27% (49 reviews)	44 (13 reviews)

=== Accolades ===
Year	Award	Category	Recipient(s)	Result	Ref.
2022	GLAAD Media Awards	Outstanding TV Movie	The Fear Street Trilogy	Nominated	
2022	MTV Movie & TV Awards	Most Frightened Performance	Sadie Sink	Nominated	

== Music ==
Title	U.S. release date	Length	Performed by	Label
Fear Street Part One: 1994 (Music from the Netflix Trilogy)	July 2, 2021	44:54	Marco Beltrami & Marcus Trumpp	Maisie Music Publishing and Milan Records
Fear Street Part Two: 1978 (Music from the Netflix Trilogy)	July 9, 2021	44:54	Marco Beltrami & Brandon Roberts	Maisie Music Publishing and Milan Records
Fear Street Part Three: 1666 (Music from the Netflix Trilogy)	July 16, 2021	44:54	Marco Beltrami, Anna Drubich & Marcus Trumpp	Maisie Music Publishing and Milan Records
Fear Street: Prom Queen (Soundtrack from the Netflix Film)	May 23, 2025	31:31	The Newton Brothers	Netflix Music

== See also ==
- Fear Street (book series) by R.L. Stine
