= A Christmas Melody =

2015 television film

- Written by: David Diamond; David Weissman
- Screenplay by: Jennifer Notas Shapiro
- Directed by: Mariah Carey
- Starring: Mariah Carey; Lacey Chabert; Brennan Elliott; Fina Strazza; Kathy Najimy
- Music by: Laura Karpman
- Country of origin: United States
- Original language: English

Production
- Producer: Karri O'Reilly
- Cinematography: Jeff Barklage
- Editor: Heath Ryan
- Running time: 83 minutes
- Production companies: MPCA; Brad Krevoy Television; Sony Pictures Television; Magic Carpet Productions; Wikked Entertainment; Axelrod / Ett Productions

Original release
- Network: Hallmark Channel
- Release: December 19, 2015

A Christmas Melody, also known under its working title of Mistletoe & Melody, is a 2015 American Christmas television film directed by Mariah Carey, who co-stars with Lacey Chabert. It was filmed in Ohio during October 2015, and premiered on the Hallmark Channel on December 19, 2015. The film was viewed by 3.95 million people upon its debut.

== Plot ==
Widowed mother Kristin has recently moved back to her home town of Silver Falls, Ohio with her daughter Emily after her fashion business in Los Angeles folded. The process has been difficult for both of them, especially as the move brings Kristin face to face with Melissa, her former rival from high school and the current president of the local Parent-Teacher Association (PTA). However, things change when Emily finds a mentor in her music teacher Danny, Kristin's former classmate who was secretly attracted to her.

== Cast ==
- Lacey Chabert as Kristin Randall Parson
- Mariah Carey as Melissa Mckean Atkinson
- Brennan Elliott as Danny Collier
- Fina Strazza as Emily Parson
- Kathy Najimy as Aunt Sarah

Credits adapted from Hallmark Channel's official website.

== Production ==
In September 2015, the Greater Cincinnati & Northern Kentucky Film Commission stated that Carey would be filming in Cincinnati for an upcoming film, Mistletoe & Melody. Carey was confirmed to be serving as the film's director and as one of the film's stars, and Stella Bulochnikov, Jonathan Axelrod, Alan Ett, Eric Jarboe and Kevin Connor were named as the movie's executive producers. Lacey Chabert and Brennan Elliott were also later confirmed as actors for the film, which had been re-titled A Christmas Melody. Child actress Fina Strazza was brought on to play Chabert's daughter and to sing "Oh Santa!", which Carey re-wrote for the film. Filming began on October 6, 2015 in the Cincinnati area suburbs of Wyoming and Hyde Park it was expected to wrap on October 16, but did not finish until October 26.

On November 17, 2015, the Hallmark Channel released a trailer for A Christmas Melody. Entertainment Tonight poked fun at the trailer, writing "Only time will tell how much holiday cheer can be stuffed into one movie, but if this trailer is any indication, A Christmas Melody will be pushing the boundaries."

== Release and reception ==
A Christmas Melody first aired on the Hallmark Channel on December 19, 2015, as part of the annual "Countdown to Christmas" holiday programming. It was seen by 3.95 million viewers upon release, more than any other show that day. VH1 wrote a mixed review for the film, stating "Sure, the film has an abrupt, saccharine ending, but that doesn't make the journey to it any less fun to watch. In terms of Mariah Carey shade, A Christmas Melody is Oscar-worthy." The New York Times was also mixed in their opinion, writing "In telling the story of Kristen (Lacey Chabert), a widowed single mom whose Los Angeles fashion boutique goes bust, the movie is as blandly watchable as everything else in Hallmark's Christmas lineup, which includes titles like I'm Not Ready for Christmas, Merry Matrimony and 'Tis the Season for Love. But Ms. Carey's participation makes the generic badness of A Christmas Melody a touch better than its neighbors. She treats herself like a woman who's come to family entertainment from Venus." NPR praised the film as a "delightfully bonkers addition to the firmament of holiday madness".
