= Omar Raza =

Scottish actor

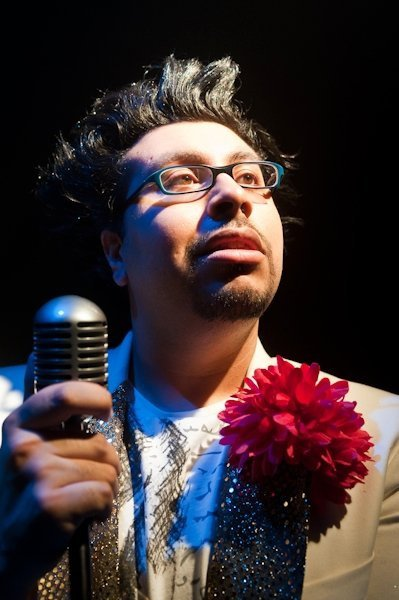
- Omar Raza in Loves Time Beggar
- Born: 5 December 1988 (age 37); Glasgow, Scotland
- Occupations: Actor, comedian
- Website: www.omarraza.co.uk

Omar Raza (born 5 December 1988) is a Scottish actor. He is best known for his role as Sanjay Majhu in the BBC Radio 4 comedy Fags, Mags and Bags, which began airing in 2007.

== Acting career ==
In 2009, he joined the main cast of Limmy's Show (Series 1), which aired in early 2010.

In 2012, he starred in an Aldi advert where he played the role as a drive-thru worker.

In 2014, he joined the cast in a BBC special about the Glasgow Commonwealth 2014 entitled "Don't Drop The Baton".

He has performed in various venues and is a part of different companies as an actor, including Citizens Theatre, Ankur Productions, The Arches (Glasgow), The Stand Comedy Club and Tron Theatre.

Aside from acting, he is also engaged in creating Islamic artwork. He has participated in Black History Month, during which his work was displayed in the Arthouse Hotel. Raza is heavily involved in community work.

He completed his year training at the BBC Actors Centre in the summer of 2010. He was involved in a short film entitled "The Sharp End", directed by veteran theatre, TV and film director, Sue Dunderdale.

Raza graduated from the University of Sunderland in the summer of 2013 with a 2:1 Honours Degree in Drama.

Omar starred in the comedy web series The Aunty G Show

Since graduating, Raza has been currently developing a one-man play entitled An Evening at 7-8-6 The Coconut Curry.

== Awards and honours ==
Raza had a double page spread dedicated to him in the Evening Times about his acting career in October 2007. In 2008, Omar was shortlisted to the final four for a BME (Black Minority Ethnic) Award in the 'Young Male of The Year Award'.

Raza was a finalist in the 'Young Scottish Muslim' awards; he won the 'Arts and Entertainment' award in 2008.

Raza was a finalist for the 'Cultural Diversity' Award in the Young Scot Awards in 2009.

He was the winner of the "New Horizons" awards in the "Scottish Minority Ethnic Achievement Awards 2011".

Raza was listed as one of Scotland's Top 50 Young Film and TV Stars, in 2012.

Raza was a finalist for the "Arts and Culture" award from the Young Ethnic Awards, in 2013.

Raza was listed as a Funny Five Scot, alongside the likes of Kevin Bridges and Susan Calman, from The Scotsman Magazine, in 2014.
