= Elaine Ellis =

Scottish actress

- Born: Elaine Mackenzie Ellis; Springburn, Scotland
- Occupation: Actress
- Years active: 1998–present
- Known for: Me Too!; Still Game; Rab C. Nesbitt

Elaine Mackenzie Ellis is a Scottish television actress and singer, best known for her roles as Tina The Taxi Lady in Me Too! on CBeebies and Natalie Nesbitt in Rab C. Nesbitt.

== Career ==
Mackenzie Ellis studied at the Royal Scottish Academy of Music and Drama, now the Royal Conservatoire of Scotland. Mackenzie Ellis is best known for her roles as Tina the Taxi driver in the CBeebies series Me Too! alongside Samantha Seager and Jane McCarry., Natalie Nesbitt in Rab C. Nesbitt for four years and had further roles such as The Twits at the Citizens Theatre in Glasgow, Cinderella at the King's Theatre in Glasgow, and played a nurse as herself in Scottish comedy Still Game. Mackenzie Ellis has also appeared in TV dramas Garrow's Law, Sunshine On Leith, Irvine Welsh's Crime 2 and radio comedies including Watson's Wind Up and Ellis Island for BBC Radio Scotland.

Mackezie Ellis' voice is featured on the Sunshine On Leith Motion Picture audio album, on track Should Have Been Loved.

In November 2023 to January 2024, Mackenzie Ellis starred as Sea Legs Senga and Brenda Gunn in Treasure Island at the Pavilion Theatre in Glasgow.

=== Television ===
Year	Film	Role	Notes
1998	Rab C. Nesbitt	Natalie Nesbitt	TV series (Series 6) BBC Scotland
1999	Rab C. Nesbitt	Natalie Nesbitt	TV series (Series 7) BBC Scotland
2003	Only an Excuse?	Various	TV (BBC Scotland)
2003	Only an Excuse? – Hogmanay Special		TV ('BBC Scotland')
2003	No Angels	Petra	TV (Channel 4)
2003	Men In Coats		TV series
2003	Feel The Force	Mrs Kennedy	TV series
2006, 2008	Me Too!	Tina the Taxi Driver	TV series (Two series) CBeebies
2007	Myself Only More So	Mrs Gregson	TV mini-series (BBC Scotland)
2010	Single Father	Val	(BBC Television)
2010	Garrow's Law	Mrs Cumberland	TV series
2010	Shameless	Jo	Channel 4
2012	One Day Like This	Joanna	TV series (Channel 4)
2014	Support The Unsupported	Counsellor	TV campaign (in aid of Barnados)
2018	Trust Me 2	Night Nurse Kelly	TV series (Recurring role for BBC One
2022	Crime	Cecelia Parish	TV series (Series 2 for ITV)
2023	Dinosaur	Roxanne	TV show – BBC Three

== Theatre ==
Mackenzie Ellis has starred in stage shows including Shetland Saga, Danny 306 and Me 4ever, The Twits, The Wizard of Oz, The Four Twins, Little Otik, Cinderella, and Peter Pan. Mackenzie Ellis is a regular performer at A Play, A Pie And A Pint in Glasgow, she has starred in shows such as Ayr News, Davina & Goliath and Second Hand.

== Personal life ==
Mackenzie Ellis was born in Springburn, Scotland, and lives in Glasgow, Scotland. Mackenzie Ellis has previously spoken out in support of her sister and mother with their health issues and the treatment they have received.
