= Fina Strazza =

American actress

- Born: November 3, 2005 (age 20); New York City, New York, U.S.
- Occupation: Actress
- Years active: 2014–present

Fina Strazza (born November 3, 2005) is an American actress known for her work in theater, television, and film. She gained prominence as the youngest actress to portray the title role in Matilda the Musical on Broadway and for her role as in KJ Brandman in Prime Video series Paper Girls. She returned to Broadway in the play John Proctor is the Villain earning a nomination for the Tony Award for Best Featured Actress in a Play. She also has a leading role in Netflix horror film Fear Street: Prom Queen as Tiffany Falconer.

== Early life and education ==
Fina Strazza was born on November 3, 2005, in New York City, New York. She is the daughter of singer Rana Strazza and Matthew Strazza, the head of a technology company. She has an older sister named Nixie.

== Career ==
In August 2014, at the age of eight, Strazza made her Broadway debut as the title character in Matilda the Musical, becoming the youngest actress to play the role. She continued in this role until July 2015, making her Broadway's longest-running Matilda at that time.

In 2015, Strazza starred as Emily Parson in the Hallmark Channel original movie A Christmas Melody, directed by and co-starring Mariah Carey. In the film, she performed a rendition of Carey's hit song "Oh Santa!".

Strazza's television appearances include guest roles on Law & Order: Special Victims Unit and Madam Secretary. She also portrayed KJ Brandman in the Amazon Prime series Paper Girls (2022).

In 2024, Strazza was cast in the Netflix horror film Fear Street: Prom Queen, part of the Fear Street series.

In 2025, Strazza was announced as part of the cast for the Broadway premiere of John Proctor is the Villain. Strazza was nominated for Best Featured Actress in a Play for the 2025 Tony Awards, and won the Dorian Award for Outstanding Featured Performance in a Broadway Play.

== Filmography ==
=== Film ===
Year	Title	Role	Notes
2014	A Little Game	Jez	
2015	A Christmas Melody	Emily Parson	Hallmark Channel TV Movie
2019	Above the Shadows	Young Holly	
2025	Fear Street: Prom Queen	Tiffany Falconer	

=== Television ===
Year	Title	Role	Notes
2019	Law & Order: Special Victims Unit	Milly Bucci	2 episodes
2019	Madam Secretary	Young Stevie	Episode: "The New Normal"
2022	Paper Girls	KJ Brandman	Main role
2024	FBI: Most Wanted	Jessie Davis	Episode: "Pig Butchering"
2026	Not Suitable for Work	Kylie	Episode: "A Birthday Party for the Whole World"

=== Stage ===
Year	Title	Role	Venue
2014	Matilda The Musical	Matilda	Broadway, Shubert Theatre
2017	Animal	Little Girl	Off-Broadway, Atlantic Theatre Company
2025	John Proctor is the Villain	Beth Powell	Broadway, Booth Theatre

== Awards and nominations ==
Year	Association	Category	Project	Result	Ref.
2025	Tony Awards	Best Featured Actress in a Play	John Proctor Is the Villain	Nominated	
2025	Dorian Award	Outstanding Featured Performance in a Broadway Play	John Proctor Is the Villain	Won	
