= Fear Street: Prom Queen =

2025 film by Matt Palmer

- Release poster
- Directed by: Matt Palmer
- Written by: Matt Palmer; Donald McLeary
- Based on: The Prom Queen by R. L. Stine
- Produced by: Peter Chernin; Jenno Topping; Kori Adelson
- Starring: India Fowler; Suzanna Son; Fina Strazza; Chris Klein; David Iacono; Ella Rubin; Ariana Greenblatt; Lili Taylor; Katherine Waterston
- Cinematography: Márk Györi
- Edited by: Christopher Donaldson
- Music by: The Newton Brothers
- Production company: Chernin Entertainment
- Distributed by: Netflix
- Release date: May 23, 2025
- Running time: 90 minutes
- Country: United States
- Language: English

Fear Street: Prom Queen is a 2025 American slasher film directed by Matt Palmer from a screenplay he co-wrote with Donald McLeary, loosely based on the novel The Prom Queen (1992) from the Fear Street book series. Produced by Chernin Entertainment, it is the fourth installment in the Fear Street film series. The film stars India Fowler, Suzanna Son, Fina Strazza, David Iacono, Ella Rubin, Chris Klein, Ariana Greenblatt, Lili Taylor, and Katherine Waterston. Set in 1988, the plot focuses on a masked killer who targets the prom queen candidates of Shadyside High School on the night of their senior dance.

Following the release of the original trilogy, discussions began about future films set within the same continuity. In October 2023, R. L. Stine announced further films to be in development, with the fourth installment being a standalone story and Chloe Okuno expected to direct. By March 2024, casting had been announced for principal characters, with McLeary and Palmer hired to adapt The Prom Queen and Palmer as director. Filming took place in Toronto and Hamilton from March to May 2024.

Fear Street: Prom Queen was released on Netflix on May 23, 2025, and was panned by critics, who named it inferior to the original three films.

== Plot ==
On May 23, 1988, the senior class of Shadyside High School prepares for their prom. Lori Granger signs up to run for prom queen against the popular girl group nicknamed the "Wolfpack", consisting of ruthless queen bee Tiffany Falconer and her friends Melissa Mckendrick, Debbie Winters, and Linda Harper. Lori is considered an outcast by her peers due to rumours of her mother murdering her father, though she was deemed innocent. Vice Principal Brekenridge intends for the prom to reinvent Shadyside in spite of the town's poor reputation. The night before prom, candidate Christy Renault, who is also a local small-time marijuana dealer, gets a firefighter axe swung into her shoulder and is killed by a masked assailant.

The following day, Lori attends prom with her best friend Megan Rogers. Later, Megan stages a prank using a moulded copy of Tiffany's head, creating a rift between her and Lori. Meanwhile, Linda and her boyfriend Bobby are mutilated and killed by the assailant in a nearby classroom. Lori receives flowers from an anonymous sender before Tiffany harasses her about her mother's past. Debbie and her boyfriend Judd head to the basement, where the assailant kills Judd, using an electric saw and electrocutes Debbie in the power room.

After Melissa helps Lori fix her makeup, Tiffany ends their friendship and ruins Melissa's dress with punch. Lori and Tiffany engage in a dance-off, during which Lori wins over the crowd and Tiffany is left embarrassed. Her boyfriend Tyler Torres breaks up with her and approaches Lori, who harbours feelings for him. Meanwhile, Melissa is killed in the girls' changing room by the assailant using a meat cleaver, revealing there are two masked assailants. Megan interrupts Lori, suspecting the disappearances of the prom queen candidates to be a serial killing carried out by Brekenridge's devoutly religious son, Devlin Brekenridge. Lori rejects Megan's theory and the two distance themselves.

Later, Megan investigates the basement where she finds the dead bodies of Debbie, Judd, and janitor Stoker. Lori and Tyler head to the auditorium where Tyler tries to initiate sex. However, the assailant plunges a kitchen knife into Tyler’s skull, killing him, and chases Lori throughout the dim lit halls. She finds Megan screaming in the basement, but they are locked inside by the assailant. After a brief chase, Lori and Megan escape through a window and rush to the gymnasium to warn everyone.

Lori is announced as prom queen just as she tries to warn the school. The assailant arrives and dismembers Claire, decapitates Gerald, and severs Principal Wayland’s arm, but he survives. Lori uses the tiara to stab the assailant in the eye, who is unmasked as Tiffany's father, Dan Falconer.

The police arrive and arrest Dan, while Megan is taken to the hospital. Lori returns home and stays with Tiffany, who apologises for her behaviour. Nancy Falconer, Tiffany's mother, returns and reveals herself as the second killer. As Lori and Tiffany hide in the closet, Tiffany tries to stab Lori, revealing that she was also involved. Nancy reveals that she was the one who killed Lori's father after he broke up with her for Lori's mother. Lori kicks Tiffany through the stairwell, impaling her on a hallway decoration below. Nancy and Lori engage in a brief struggle before Lori bludgeons Nancy's skull with a trophy and flees the house. As she dies, Nancy's blood forms the Witch's Mark.

== Cast ==
- India Fowler as Lori Granger
- Suzanna Son as Megan Rogers, Lori's best friend
- Fina Strazza as Tiffany Falconer, Lori's rival
- Chris Klein as Dan Falconer, Tiffany's father and a teacher
- David Iacono as Tyler Torres, Tiffany's boyfriend
- Ella Rubin as Melissa McKendrick, Tiffany's friend
- Ariana Greenblatt as Christy Renault
- Lili Taylor as Vice Principal Dolores Brekenridge
- Katherine Waterston as Nancy Falconer, Tiffany's mother
- Darrin Baker as Principal Wayland
- Rebecca Ablack as Debbie Winters, Tiffany's friend
- Ilan O'Driscoll as Linda Harper, Tiffany's friend
- Damian Romeo as Judd, Debbie's boyfriend
- Dakota Taylor as Bobby, Linda's boyfriend
- Eden Summer Gilmore as Claire, a Tiffany's supporter
- Brennan Clost as Gerald, a Tiffany's supporter
- Cecilia Lee as Harmony LaFay, the school's reporter
- Dale Whibley as Jimmy, Christy's boyfriend

== Production ==
In July 2022, R. L. Stine stated that there are discussions for additional films being developed beyond the initial Fear Street trilogy.

In December 2022, it was reported that Chloe Okuno would direct an upcoming Fear Street installment, and that Chernin Entertainment would return to produce.

In October 2023, Stine stated that the film series will continue with additional Fear Street installments in development. This was confirmed by Scott Stuber when he revealed that the next installment would be a standalone film from R. L. Stine's Fear Street book series. In January 2024, Stine confirmed that the project was in the works and that it was adapting The Prom Queen, specifically, from the series. In March, the film was titled Fear Street: Prom Queen. The screenplay was adapted by Donald McLeary and Matt Palmer, who would also direct.

With the title announcement, the initial cast was revealed to include India Fowler, Suzanna Son, Fina Strazza, David Iacono, Ella Rubin, Chris Klein, Lili Taylor, and Katherine Waterston. Additional reports revealed that Ariana Greenblatt had joined the cast as well. Principal photography began in Toronto on March 25, 2024, continued into Hamilton and wrapped on May 14.

== Release ==
Fear Street: Prom Queen was released on Netflix on May 23, 2025.

== Reception ==
On the review aggregator website Rotten Tomatoes, 27% of 74 critics' reviews are positive, with an average rating of 4/10. The website's consensus reads: "Tired and uninspired, Fear Street plays like an '80s retread of better slashers, while ensuring the winning crown does not go to this Prom Queen." On Metacritic, the film has a weighted average score of 41 out of 100 based on 15 critic reviews, indicating "mixed or average reviews.

Alison Forman writing for Indiewire, described the film as "flirty and fiendish", and graded it a B+. She wrote: "when total commitment collides with enough gore and guts, this wonderfully energetic soiree sidesteps tired tropes to reach a royally dark place". She also noted that Palmer's direction "rules as definitive proof there is more fun to be had adapting this spooky book series" and expressed the possibility of Netflix releasing future Fear Street films annually. Clint Worthington for RogerEbert.com unfavorably compared the film to its predecessors, describing it as an "enormous step-down" and criticized Palmer's direction. He added: "Fear Street started as a series that tried to reinvent the wheel, even just by dint of its structure and nods to the innate curse of marginalization; this is empty-headed, straightforward slasher schlock on purpose".

Dennis Harvey of Variety noted its influences, but argued that "Fear Street: Prom Queen never rises above its pedestrian concept, which simply lifts cliches from standard slice-and-dice opuses, as well as high school satires like Heathers and Mean Girls, without ever figuring just how seriously it wants to take them". In addition, he criticized the characters as one-dimensional and the final climax to be "over-the-top" and the film's lack of campiness. However, he commended the performances and added: "That's not the fault of the competent, generally well-cast actors — doing their best, even if you may lament the veteran talent wasted — but rather with the film's tonal uncertainty".

Natalia Keogan of The AV Club was more critical, and graded the film a "D", describing it as "a drab, muddled mess, where trite clichés and tepid cinematography are what truly deserve to die". She especially criticized the film's cinematography for not capturing the 1980s' aesthetics and concluded: "Void of genre send-ups, visual finesse, '80s styling, or horror's requisite bloodshed, Fear Street: Prom Queen doesn’t even possess the distinction of attempting to emulate horror films from the decade it's set in. This Netflix Original dud could only ever aspire to be a copycat killer, but even then, it doesn’t have the guts."

Luna Guthrie of Collider was more positive, saying that the film is "not breaking any new ground, but Prom Queen is a solid enough teen slasher that does a nice job of continuing the ever-expanding universe of R.L. Stine". She especially praised the performances of Strazza and Waterston, writing that "They're a great duo to watch, and the movie gives them just enough material to really make an impact". She also commends the film's characterization, adding that "even movies that aim to appeal to the most basic tenets of entertainment can do so with an element of sophistication".

== Viewership ==
According to data from Showlabs, Fear Street: Prom Queen ranked second on Netflix in the United States during the week of 19–25 May 2025.
