= Fear Street: Prom Queen (soundtrack) =

Fear Street: Prom Queen (Soundtrack from the Netflix Film)

Film score by the Newton Brothers
- Released: May 23, 2025
- Recorded: 2024–2025
- Genre: Film score
- Length: 31:31
- Label: Netflix Music
- Producer: The Newton Brothers

The Newton Brothers chronology
Daredevil: Born Again (2025)	Fear Street: Prom Queen (2025)	The Life of Chuck (2025)

Fear Street: Prom Queen (Soundtrack from the Netflix Film) is the film score to the 2025 film Fear Street: Prom Queen directed by Matt Palmer, based on the novel The Prom Queen (1992) from the Fear Street book series and the fourth installment in the Fear Street film series. The film score is composed by the Newton Brothers and released through Netflix Music on May 23, 2025.

== Background ==
The Newton Brothers was announced to compose the film score in April 2025, replacing Marco Beltrami who co-composed the previous films in the instalment with his assistants. Palmer instructed the team to work on a "synth-heavy" score despite the film's setting in 1988. Nora Felder worked as the music supervisor, who selected some of the successful singles from 1988. According to Palmer, "The challenging thing about the needle drops is there's so much great music from 1988 that it was tough to pick between different tunes [...] Sometimes it was real heavyweight head-to-heads for certain scenes. Some of the songs, like 'I'm Not Scared' [by Eighth Wonder] and ['White Wedding' by] Billy Idol, were right there from the script stage, but with others we experimented with different ones. It was tough to choose, because 1988 was a really good year for music."

== Release ==
The score album was released through Netflix Music on May 23, 2025.

== Reception ==
Dennis Harvey of Variety wrote "The Newton Brothers' original score hews to a similar synthy template." Hannah Rose of Comic Book Resources wrote "The original synthwave score, courtesy of the Newton Brothers, is a standout. It sounds like the lovechild of John Carpenter, Power Glove, and the soundtracks of the Puppet Combo horror games." Mark Burger of Yes! Weekly wrote "[The Newton Brothers'] score (heavy on synthesizers) is very much in keeping with the '80s setting." Andrew Parker of TheGATE.ca called it "a nice synth heavy score from The Newton Brothers that makes the cool decision to be more like Goblin and Tangerine Dream than John Carpenter for a change (with some serious Sorcerer vibes at times, which is nice, even though it's not a horror film)". Kat Hughes of The Hollywood News wrote "The score itself is synth heavy, riffing quite strongly in sections on Disasterpeace's mesmeric It Follows score."

== Track listing ==
No.	Title	Length
1.	"Time to Shine"	1:43
2.	"Showtime"	1:43
3.	"You Freak"	2:03
4.	"Vote Tiffany"	1:15
5.	"Judd & Debbie"	1:31
6.	"Turn the Other Way"	1:11
7.	"Where Are the Prom Queens"	4:52
8.	"Trapped"	2:26
9.	"Killing on the Dance Floor"	2:12
10.	"Charnel House"	2:39
11.	"Mommy Dearest"	2:49
12.	"Let Me Do It"	2:14
13.	"Red Axe"	2:15
14.	"Prom Night"	2:38
Total length:		31:31

== Additional music ==
Commercial songs featured in the film, but not included in the soundtrack:

- "Vengeance" – Power Glove
- "Are You Ready" – Henry Wilson and the Bluenotes
- "Teen Age Confession" – Ted Embry
- "White Wedding Pt. 1" – Billy Idol
- "You've Got Another Thing Comin'" – Judas Priest
- "Never Gonna Give You Up" – Rick Astley
- "The Look" – Roxette
- "Cruel Summer" – Bananarama
- "I Think We're Alone Now" – Tiffany
- "Self Control" – Laura Branigan
- "Hungry Like the Wolf" – Duran Duran
- "White Lines (Don't Don't Do It)" – Grandmaster Flash
- "Sweet Dreams (Are Made of This)" – Eurythmics
- "Gloria" – Laura Branigan
- "I'm Not Scared" – Eighth Wonder
