= Fear Street Part One: 1994 (soundtrack) =

Film score by Marco Beltrami and Marcus Trumpp
- Released: July 2, 2021
- Recorded: 2021
- Genre: Film score
- Length: 44:54
- Labels: Maisie Music Publishing; Milan

Marco Beltrami chronology
A Quiet Place Part II (2021)	Fear Street Part One: 1994 (2021)	Fear Street Part Two: 1978 (2021)

Marcus Trumpp chronology
Greta (2021)	Fear Street Part One: 1994 (2021)	Fear Street Part Three: 1666 (2021)

Fear Street Part One: 1994 (Music from the Netflix Trilogy) is the film score soundtrack to the 2021 film Fear Street Part One: 1994, the first instalment in the Fear Street trilogy. Composed by Marco Beltrami and Marcus Trumpp, their score consisted of 19 tracks that are released by Maisie Music Publishing and Milan Records on July 2, 2021, with an expanded score being released with its sequels by Intrada Records in August 2024. The score is influenced by horror films from the 1990s, most notably the score for Scream (1996) which was composed by Beltrami himself.

== Development ==
In May 2021, it was announced that Marco Beltrami would compose the musical score for the trilogy, where he would collaborate with Marcus Trumpp for the score. The film's director Leigh Janiak met Beltrami to discuss the music, which he eventually agreed to do so. She had listened to the score of Scream (1996) composed by Beltrami and liked it which she defined it as a "revolutionary in what they did for horror sound" which was bombastic and filled with unnerving choices. The resultant score is being influenced from Beltrami's compositions in Scream and other horror films in the 1990s.

Before scripting the film, Janiak had compiled a selection of songs in a playlist when she pitched the project and played them while writing the story. He then shared the playlists with the cast and crew and listened to it on set. She added that "it was important to find music that thematically spoke to the moment that the characters were in, which can immediately bring you back to that place."

== Release ==
Fear Street Part One: 1994 (Music from the Netflix Trilogy) was released day-and-date with the film on July 2, 2021, distributed by Maisie Music Publishing and Milan Records.

In mid-July 2021, Waxwork Records announced that it would distribute the triple LP album of the score for Part One: 1994 and its sequels, that would feature original artworks inspired by the graphic novels and liner notes from Beltrami, Janiak and others. The album was released on November 12, 2021.

== Reception ==
Jonathan Broxton in his review for Movie Music UK called it as "one of the most enjoyable, unpretentiously entertaining horror scores Beltrami has written in quite some time, a superb combination of thematic strength and full-blooded orchestral butchery that truly engrosses from start to finish." Benjamin Lee of The Guardian called it as a "a high-drama and high-impact score that is a nice, and thrilling, touch". Kristy Puchko of IGN India wrote "composer Marco Beltrami brings chills with a score that harkens back to his work on The Faculty and the Scream movies."

Lovia Gyarkye of The Hollywood Reporter described the score as "appropriately suspenseful", while Jim Vorel of Paste called it as "evocative". Erik Kain of Forbes wrote that the score and its soundtrack "does its best to provoke the nostalgia centers in our brains". Chad Collins of Dread Central called it as an "indefatigable, Scream-esque score" that sounds "so much like his nineties work".

== Track listing ==
=== Standard edition ===
Fear Street Part One: 1994 (Music from the Netflix Trilogy) standard edition track listing
No.	Title	Length
1.	"Mall Massacre"	3:53
2.	"Main Titles"	2:07
3.	"Morning in Shadyside"	2:00
4.	"Candlelight Vigil"	3:16
5.	"Stop the Bus"	1:36
6.	"Goode in the Woods"	1:50
7.	"Some Creeper"	1:58
8.	"Skullmask"	2:46
9.	"Sheriff Goode"	2:45
10.	"Reminder of Us"	3:41
11.	"Bathroom Blowout"	2:31
12.	"Sam Bait"	2:27
13.	"Berman Is the Key" (co-composed by Brandon Roberts)	2:29
14.	"Market Massacre"	6:26
15.	"Bring Her Back"	2:11
16.	"See You Tonight"	1:32
17.	"Sam Attack"	1:26
Total length:		44:54

=== Intrada expanded edition ===
Intrada Records released a 5-CD box set that featuring the complete score for the three films, including previously unreleased materials, on August 2, 2024. Disc 1 and disc 2 compile the music for this film.

Fear Street Part One: 1994 expanded edition track listing
No.	Title	Length
1.	"Logo"	0:26
2.	"Mall Massacre"	5:57
3.	"Main Titles"	2:08
4.	"Tragedy Struck Again"	2:04
5.	"She Reaches from Beyond"	2:56
6.	"Candlelight Vigil"	3:20
7.	"Look to the Light"	1:32
8.	"Stop the Bus"	1:39
9.	"After the Crash"	1:15
10.	"Goode in the Woods"	1:54
11.	"Morning in Shadyside"	1:36
12.	"Some Creeper"	2:03
13.	"Arguing Peter to Death"	1:31
14.	"Skullmask"	2:50
15.	"Sheriff Goode"	3:02
16.	"Deena's Got a Gun"	1:49
17.	"Ruby Attacks"	3:07
18.	"Curse Is Real"	3:08
19.	"Dead Maniacs"	3:39
20.	"Just Like Jaws"	2:20
21.	"A Reminder of Us"	3:43
22.	"Bathroom Blowout"	3:36
23.	"Sam Bait"	2:37
24.	"C Berman Is the Key"	2:35
25.	"Goode Warning"	2:56
26.	"Right Now You Have to Die"	3:01
27.	"Market Massacre"	6:32
28.	"Bring Her Back"	2:22
29.	"Fell on Glass"	2:38
30.	"See You Tonight"	1:36
31.	"Berman Calls Deena"	2:23
32.	"Mall Massacre" (film version alternate ending)	1:33
33.	"Main Titles" (alternate film version)	1:51
Total length:		85:39

== Additional music ==
The soundtrack featured licensed songs from the 1990s, where few of them released after 1994, where the film's story is set in that period. Though an official soundtrack was not released, Netflix issued a playlist featuring the songs in Spotify.

#	Artist(s)	Song	Key scene(s)/Notes
1	Nine Inch Nails	"Closer"	Played over the opening murder scene in the mall.
2	Garbage	"Only Happy When It Rains"	Played in a sequence where Deena tries to write her hate note to Sam.
3	Iron Maiden	"Fear of the Dark"	Josh chats online to the Shadyside Killers chat group.
4	Bush	"Machinehead"	Josh walks through his school corridors (originally released in 1996).
5	Sophie B. Hawkins	"Damn I Wish I Was Your Lover"	Josh sees his crush Kate at school and time slows down.
6	Portishead	"Sour Times"	As Deena walks through school and was annoyed at the sight of students kissing.
7	Cypress Hill	"Insane in the Brain"	Deena gets on the bus to the football game against Sunnyvale
8	Radiohead	"Creep"	Deena listens to music on the way to the game.
9	99 tales	"Thursday"	Plays quietly in the background as Deena calls Sam's house after the game and the crash.
10	White Zombie	"More Human Than Human"	The song is played twice in the film. Once, where Josh plays video games in his room and the second time at the film's end credits (originally released in 1995).
11	Snoop Dogg	"Gz and Hustlas"	Kate and Simon babysit Deena's neighbor.
12	Roberta Flack	"Killing Me Softly with His Song"	Deena and the kids go to the hospital to visit an injured Sam.
13	White Town	"Your Woman"	Deena and the kids meet Nurse Eddy (originally released in 1995).
14	The Mills Brothers	"You Always Hurt The One You Love"	Simon is attacked by Ruby, who sings a second version of that song as she did when she killed her victims.
15	Cowboy Junkies	"Sweet Jane"	Plays when Josh and Kate share a kiss, so as Sam and Deena.
16	The Prodigy	"Firestarter"	The kids lay a trap for the witch's henchmen in the school (originally released in 1996).
17	Pixies	"Hey"	Played in Sam's mixtape at the very end, as he and Deena cuddle in bed.
18	Soundgarden	"The Day I Tried To Live"	Josh talks online again to explain the murders as Sam attacks Deena upstairs.
19	Alice Cooper	"School's Out"	Plays over the tease for the sequel.
