= A Quiet Place Part II (soundtrack) =

A Quiet Place II (Music from the Motion Picture)

Film score by Marco Beltrami
- Released: May 28, 2021
- Recorded: February 2020
- Genre: Film score
- Length: 37:24
- Label: Paramount Music
- Producer: Marco Beltrami; Buck Sanders

Marco Beltrami chronology
| Chaos Walking (2021) | A Quiet Place II (Music from the Motion Picture) (2021) | Fear Street Part One: 1994 (2021) |

A Quiet Place II (Music from the Motion Picture) is the film score soundtrack to the 2021 film A Quiet Place Part II directed by John Krasinski, the sequel to A Quiet Place (2018). The film's score was composed by Marco Beltrami, who returned from the predecessor to score the film, conducted by Pete Anthony and performed by the Hollywood Studio Symphony. It was recorded at Malibu, California in February 2020, before the COVID-19 pandemic. The score album featured 15 tracks released by Paramount Music on May 28, 2021.

== Development ==
According to Beltrami, the score for A Quiet Place II is an extension of the predecessor's themes with new material had been produced for the film. Beltrami incorporated and developed three themes from the first film: the family theme, father-daughter theme and creature sounds. The first theme is played on a flute with minor changes in orchestration, while the second theme consisted of very sparse orchestration, with piano and harp before being developed into a full-fledged orchestral score.

In the first film, as the characters being isolated from sounds for a longer time, he detuned the black notes on a piano by a quarter tone to give it a skewed sound. As for the sequel, he used two pianos, where one has been played normally and the other being detuned completely to create a dissonance between the two pianos. The pianos were used as the pulsing rhythmic elements that driven the film's intensity. Beltrami further used Shepard tones in the sound effects with change in tempo and pace, to provide a sense of anticipation and anxiety to the viewer. He closely worked with supervising sound editors Erik Aadahl and Ethan Van der Ryn to refrain the sound overlap with the score, but provide a more unified approach.

Beltrami recorded the score in Malibu, California with a 38-piece orchestra from the Hollywood Studio Symphony where the musicians would play strings, brass and percussions. The orchestrations were provided by Miles Hankins and Marcus Trumpp, and the orchestra conducted by Pete Anthony, whereas Buck Sanders, besides co-producing the score, provided the electro-acoustic elements and processed sounds. The score was mixed by Tyson Lozensky and edited by Jim Schultz. He could not supervise the final score mix at New York City due to the rise of COVID-19 pandemic cases across the world, thereby not hearing the final score.

== Release ==
A Quiet Place II's score was released digitally under the Paramount Music label on 28 May 2021, alongside the film. La-La Land Records released a limited edition soundtrack of 2,000 units on physical CDs. Death Waltz Recording Company published the album in a 140-gram vinyl LP and issued it on the fall of 2021.

== Reception ==
Filmtracks.com reviewed "the unlistenable portions of A Quiet Place: Part II are fewer, and Beltrami finally infuses some weightier hints of warmth throughout via a more organic, orchestral presence." Nick Allen of RogerEbert.com wrote "Marco Beltrami's score brings in the original's meditative themes when it's not trying to blow you to the back of the theater." David Rooney of The Hollywood Reporter "like the first film, this one also benefits immeasurably from Marco Beltrami's vigorous orchestral score, which shifts between ominous groans and thundering high drama, dialing up the tension throughout." Justin Chang of Los Angeles Times described it as "dread-inducing". Tom Beasley of Flickering Myth wrote "Marco Beltrami's carefully deployed musical score and the immaculate sound design combining to utilise every decibel of the multiplex sound system in order to extract every last drop of fear." Jake Wilson of The Sydney Morning Herald wrote "composer Marco Beltrami usually supplies some percussive thrumming to fill the gaps." JimmyO of JoBlo.com wrote "the haunting score by Marco Beltrami does a good job of maneuvering through genres."

== Track listing ==
A Quiet Place II (Music from the Motion Picture) track listing
| No. | Title | Length |
|---|---|---|
| 1. | "From the Beginning" | 0:51 |
| 2. | "Leaving the Farm" | 1:34 |
| 3. | "Watch Us Run" | 2:01 |
| 4. | "Moving In" | 2:26 |
| 5. | "Show Me Your Face" | 1:17 |
| 6. | "Regan On Her Own" | 1:18 |
| 7. | "Training Day" | 2:38 |
| 8. | "Mother and Child" | 1:42 |
| 9. | "Family Ties" | 2:44 |
| 10. | "You Scream You Die" | 6:31 |
| 11. | "Dive" | 3:44 |
| 12. | "Emmets Realizations" | 2:06 |
| 13. | "Entering the Station" | 4:13 |
| 14. | "Encouraging Feedback" | 2:10 |
| 15. | "A Grateful Family" | 2:09 |
| Total length: | | 37:24 |

== Credits ==
- Music – Marco Beltrami
- Additional music – Miles Hankins, Marcus Trumpp, Brandon Roberts
- Producer – Buck Sanders, Marco Beltrami
- Recording and mixing – Tyson Lozensky
- Mastering – Erick Labson
- Music editor – Jim Schultz
- Music co-ordinator – Michael Murphy
- Production manager – Frank K. DeWald, Neil S. Bulk

Orchestra

- Performer – The Hollywood Studio Symphony
- Conductor – Pete Anthony
- Orchestrator – Miles Hankins, Marcus Trumpp
- Orchestra contractor – Peter Rotter
- Concertmaster – Belinda Broughton

Instruments

- Bassoon – Anthony Parnther, William May
- Cello – Andrew Shulman, Dennis Karmazyn, Jacob Braun, Ross Gasworth, Vanessa Freebairn-Smith
- Contrabass – Nico Abondolo
- Flute – Sara Andon
- French horn – Allen Fogle, David Everson, Dylan Hart, Katelyn Faraudo
- Trombone – Alan Kaplan, Alex Iles, Craig Gosnell
- Trumpet – Barry Perkins, Rob Schaer
- Tuba – Doug Tornquist
- Violin – Belinda Broughton
