= Chris McCausland =

British comedian (born 1977)

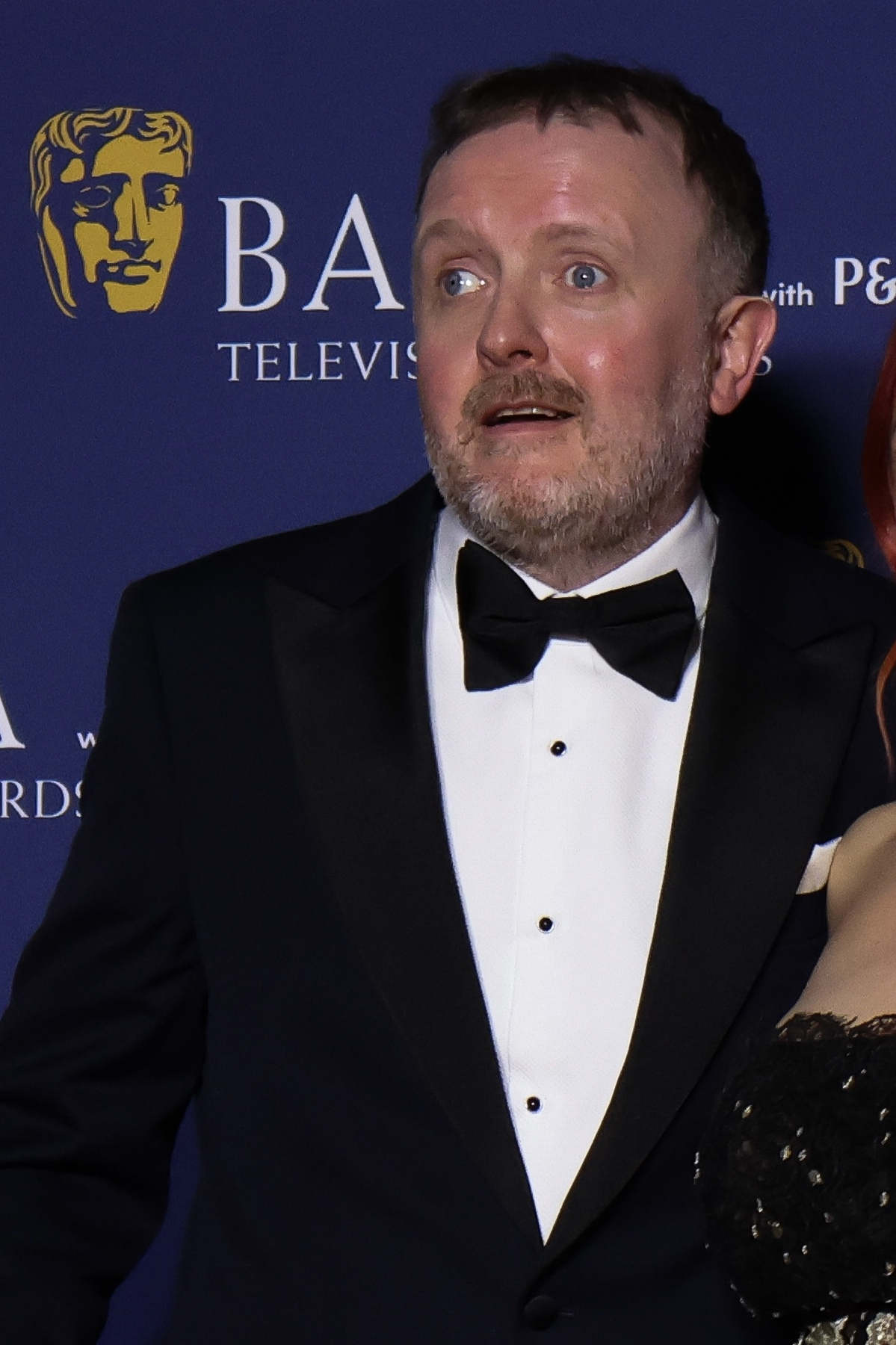
- McCausland in 2026
- Born: Christopher John McCausland; 15 June 1977 (age 49); Liverpool, Merseyside, England
- Education: Kingston University (BSc)

Comedy career
- Years active: 2003–present
- Medium: Stand-up; television

Christopher John McCausland (born 15 June 1977) is an English actor and comedian. He is known to television audiences for his role as Rudi in the CBeebies show Me Too!. He regularly appears at comedy venues including The Comedy Store. McCausland is blind due to retinitis pigmentosa.

In 2024, McCausland won the twenty-second series of the BBC competition Strictly Come Dancing, paired with professional dancer Dianne Buswell, with whom he received a BAFTA Award alongside in 2025 for one of their performances.

== Early life ==
Christopher John McCausland was born on 15 June 1977 and grew up in West Derby Village in Liverpool. He has a younger sister. He has lived in Surbiton, near Kingston upon Thames, since 1996, after moving there to study at Kingston University. He graduated in 2000, with a BSc Honours in Software Engineering. After a spell as a web developer, deteriorating eyesight prompted a change of direction and he worked in sales for a number of years, during which time he first performed stand-up comedy in 2003.

== Stand-up comedy ==
McCausland first tried stand-up at a new act comedy night in a room above a pub in Balham, south London, in July 2003. Within his first year of performing, he won the Jongleurs J2O Last Laugh competition, came runner up in the Laughing Horse New Act of The Year and came third in Channel 4's So You Think You're Funny? competition.

Between 2005 and 2012, he took six stand-up shows to the Edinburgh Festival and in 2011 was awarded the Creative Diversity Award for comedy by a Channel 4-led panel of broadcasters which also included BBC, ITV and Sky. He has performed all over the world, including across Asia and the Middle East, and regularly travels the UK playing the country's top comedy clubs. He appeared on the BBC's Live at the Apollo on 4 January 2018 and hosted the show on 7 January 2022.

== Television ==
In 2014, McCausland fronted a national television advert for Barclays, promoting the benefits of their new talking cash machines. Also in 2014, he starred in the Jimmy McGovern drama series Moving On, alongside Anna Crilly and Neil Fitzmaurice. In 2012, he appeared alongside fellow comedians in Jimmy Carr's Comedians Special charity episode of Celebrity Deal or No Deal.

McCausland appeared in three series of At The Comedy Store in 2008 for Paramount Comedy as well as in 2010 and 2012 for Comedy Central. In 2010, he featured in BBC One's end of year spoof news review, Unwrapped with Miranda Hart. In 2011, he appeared in ITV's series Stand-up Hero.

McCausland was also one of the principal characters in the CBeebies series Me Too!, playing Rudi the market trader. Filmed in 2006, it aired on CBeebies and internationally until April 2016. On 20 August 2018, he appeared in the long-running BBC soap opera EastEnders.

On 18 October 2019, he appeared on the BBC comedy panel show Would I Lie to You?.

McCausland has established himself as a regular panellist on the BBC satirical news show, Have I Got News for You, making seven appearances since his November 2019 debut. His most recent appearance was in January 2026.

In February 2020, he appeared on an episode of 8 Out of 10 Cats Does Countdown on Channel 4. McCausland scored highly throughout the episode, playing by memory alone, and correctly guessed the difficult end of game "Countdown Conundrum" before the sighted panellists. During the show, presenter Jimmy Carr produced blindfolds for the other contestants and encouraged them to try playing without sight.

On 15 January 2021, he appeared again on the BBC One show Would I Lie to You?.

In July 2022, Channel 4 announced McCausland would present a four-part travelogue series, provisionally titled The Wonders of the World I Can't See. The series aired in June and July 2023.

In April 2023, he was a contestant in the reality television series Scared of the Dark. In December 2023, he was a contestant on Richard Osman's House of Games.

In March 2024, he featured in series 13, episode 5 of Not Going Out, "Train". On 29 June 2024, his Saturday morning chatshow The Chris McCausland Show premiered on ITV1.

In September 2024, McCausland competed in the twenty-second series of BBC's Strictly Come Dancing, where he was partnered by professional dancer Dianne Buswell. He is the first blind contestant to appear on the show. In week 3 the couple danced a jive to the "Wayne's World Theme" and scored 30 points; in week 4 they danced a salsa to "Down Under" and again scored 30 points; and in week 5 they danced a waltz to "You'll Never Walk Alone" and scored 35 points. The couple became the 100th Strictly couple to perform in Blackpool. In the semi-finals they danced a Charleston and a Viennese Waltz, the latter of which scored 36 points. They were ultimately announced as the series winners. In May 2025, the couple's waltz - which featured a passage of McCausland walking unaided and unsighted - won the British Academy Television Award for Memorable Moment at the 2025 British Academy Television Awards.

On 23 December 2024, it was announced that McCausland would deliver the annual Channel 4 alternative Christmas message, on Christmas Day, in which he would appeal for an end to discrimination against disabled people.

He appeared as a panelist on The Big Fat Quiz of the Year in 2024, paired with Maisie Adam. Some viewers complained that the quiz featured many visual elements, with little effort made to account for his visual impairment.

=== Acting credits ===
Year	Title	Role	Notes
2006-2007	Me Too!	Rudi	
2014	Moving On	Daniel	Episode: "Blind"
2018	EastEnders	Carl	1 episode
2023	Not Going Out	Martin	Episode: "Train"
2024	Krapopolis	Homer	Episode: "Death Takes a Holiday"
2024	Bad Tidings	Scott	Television film

== Radio ==
McCausland was a guest on BBC Radio 4's The Museum of Curiosity in February 2023. His hypothetical donation to this imaginary museum was "a vinyl record". Since March 2023, he has hosted a Radio 4 panel game about sound clips, called You Heard It Here First.

In April 2024, he featured on BBC Radio 4’s Room 101. In January 2025, McCausland and his Strictly partner Buswell began a new podcast, called Winning Isn't Everything. Since 5 July 2026, McCausland has presented a Sunday morning radio show on Absolute Radio.

== Personal life ==
McCausland is married to Patricia Mazure and the couple have one daughter.

His blindness is due to retinitis pigmentosa, a genetic condition that has affected both his mother and grandmother. McCausland had complete loss of sight by the age of 22.

He is a supporter of Liverpool F.C. McCausland published his autobiography, Keep Laughing, in October 2025.
