= Me Too! (TV series) =

Children's live-action educational television series

- Genre: Children's
- Created by: Brian Jameson
- Directed by: Andrew Agnew, Martin Burt, Brian Ross, Paul Holmes, John Smith, Jack Jameson
- Starring: Jane McCarry; Rosemary Amoani; Chris McCausland; Donald Cameron; Matthew McVarish; Elaine Ellis; Samantha Seager; Ross Allan; Joyce Galugbo; Michelle Rodley
- Theme music composer: Lester Barnes
- Opening theme: Riverseafingal
- Ending theme: Riverseafingal (Reprise)
- Composer: Lester Barnes (revised) Gregor Philp (original) Jane McLaughlin (original)
- Country of origin: United Kingdom (Scotland)
- Original language: English
- No. of series: 2
- No. of episodes: 150

Production
- Executive producers: Brian Jameson, Helen Doherty
- Production locations: Gourock; Edinburgh; Newcastle upon Tyne; Manchester; London; North Berwick; Glasgow
- Running time: 20 minutes
- Production companies: Tattiemoon Productions; BBC Scotland

Original release
- Network: CBeebies; BBC Two
- Release: 4 September 2006 – 28 March 2008

Related
- Balamory

Me Too! is a British live action educational television programme for preschool children, created by Brian Jameson and broadcast on BBC Two and CBeebies from September 2006 to March 2008. Set in the fictional city of Riverseafingal in Scotland, though in reality the programme was filmed in North Berwick, Glasgow, Edinburgh, London, Newcastle upon Tyne and Manchester, the round school in the programme is a real school situated in Gourock, called Gourock Primary School.

Me Too! was produced by Glasgow-based production company Tattiemoon. One of the directors is Andrew Agnew, who played PC Plum from Balamory which had the same similarities in concept as Me Too!.

== The series ==
The series follows six parents and their children, including Rebecca, Jack, Kai and Lisa, and a dog called Sampson who are apart during the day as the children go to Granny Murray's house and the parents go to work. At various points in the programme, the parent will think of their child and a 'think puff' travels across the city to Granny Murray's house, then the child will think of their parent and the 'think puff' will travel back to the parents' work.

The programme then alternates between what the parents are doing at work and what the children are doing with Granny Murray. One of the aims behind the series is to reassure children of working parents who go to childminders that their parents are always thinking of them. In addition, children get a view into an adult's working day.

Each episode's plot hinges on a problem that develops at work and the main character's "race against time" to sort it out. Granny Murray always provides a kernel of wisdom during the programme's opening that helps the problem be solved. The programme features much usage of clocks and time, and hence also aims to teach young children to tell the time.

== Characters ==
=== Adults ===
- Granny Murray (played by Jane McCarry) is the main character of the series. She is a childminder who takes care of the children who attend her house on Tattiemoon Lane and gives advice to the parents, which always helps the other adults whenever they have their predicaments. Her two songs, which are played every episode, are the short two-line song "Who's Home?" and the faster and upbeat "My Time Too", which is played at the end of every episode before she delivers a recap on the episode. Her role in the series is similar to that of Miss Hoolie on Balamory.
- Rudi (played by Chris McCausland) is a blind fruit and veg trader and the father of Jack and husband of Louie. He operates a stall on the Riverseafingal Market that sells fruits and vegetables. His think puff colour is yellow. When Rudi is in a hurry, he rides a taxi (not Tina's) to work. His song is "The Market".
- Tina (played by Elaine Mackenzie Ellis) is a taxi driver and the mother of Lisa and wife of Raymond. She takes customers in her pink taxi around Riverseafingal, and she is also a theatrical costume and prop hirer when she isn't driving. Her think puff colour is pink. When Tina is in a hurry to work, she rides the subway to work. Her song is "Pretty Pink Taxi" .
- Raymond (played by Matthew McVarish) is a railway buffet car manager and the father of Lisa and husband of Tina. He operates the Buffet car on the Riverseafingal Trains. His think puff colour is cyan. When Raymond is in a hurry, he rides the metro to the station. His song is "I Love My Train".
- Dr. Juno (played by Rosemary Amoani) is an A&E consultant and the owner of Sampson. She works in the hospital, mainly in the children's department. Her think puff colour is purple. She usually cycles to work, but when she is in a hurry, she rides the tram to the work. Her song is "I'm Rushing Here and There".
- Mickey John (played by Donald Cameron) is a primary school teacher and the father of Rebecca. He teaches a class at the local primary school. His think puff colour is orange. When Mickey John is in a hurry, he rides the speedboat across the river to work. His song is "School Day, Work Away".
- Bobby (played by Samantha Seager) is a bus cleaner and the mother of Kai. She runs the nightshift at the bus depot, making sure the local buses are nice and clean for the next day. Her think puff colour is green. When Bobby is in a hurry, she rides the bus to the depot. Her song is "Bobby Boogie Woogie".

=== Children/Pets ===
- Jack (played by Jack McGarill), the son of Rudi and Louie (only Rudi takes him to Granny Murray's).
- Lisa (played by Lisa Irvine), the daughter of Tina and Raymond.
- Sampson the Dog (played by Jess the Dog), the pet of Dr Juno.
- Rebecca (played by Rebecca Morrow), the daughter of Mickey John.
- Kai (played by Kai Ross), the son of Bobby.

=== Recurring Characters ===
There are many recurring characters seen throughout the series, ranging from children who stay with Granny Murray, and other adults who make frequent appearances.

- Nurse Hendry (played by Ross Allan) is a A&E Nurse who works with Dr Juno in the hospital.
- Chuck (played by Joyce Galugbo) and Louie (played by Michelle Rodley) are Ferryboat Band musicians who are part of the Ferryboat Band. Louie is married to Rudi and the mother of Jack, though she never takes him to Granny Murray's. Their song is "The Ferryboat Band".

== Songs ==
- Riverseafingal – Title Theme
- Who's Home? – Granny Murray's house theme
- Which Way Will I Go? – Transition theme
- I Need to Get to Work – Transition theme
- The Market – Rudi's theme
- Pretty Pink Taxi – Tina's theme
- I Love My Train – Raymond's theme
- I'm Rushing Here and There – Dr. Juno's theme
- School Day, Work Away – Mickey John's theme
- Bobby Boogie Woogies – Bobby's theme
- The Ferryboat Band Song – Chuck and Louie's theme (series 2 only)
- The Race Against Time Song – Solving theme
- My Time Too – Granny Murray's recap theme
- Riverseafingal (Reprise) – End Credits Theme

== Development ==
On 7 November 2005 the BBC commissioned Tattiemoon to produce the series for a 2006 broadcast. On 27 February 2006 the first 75 episodes were announced to be broadcast within the autumn and winter, with the rest airing during the spring of 2007.

== Episodes ==
=== Series 1 (2006–07) ===
No. overall	No. in series	Title	Directed by	Written by	Original release date
1	1	"I Want to Dance"	John Smith	Wayne Jackman	4 September 2006
Raymond starts selling special chocolate mousses in the buffet car. Nobody wants to buy them, but when he does finally find a buyer; Mena the Dancer, there are disastrous consequences.: Main Character: Raymond; First appearances of "Who's Home?", Raymond's version of "Which Way Will I Go?", "I Love My Train" (Raymond's song), Raymond's version of "The Race Against Time Song" and "My Time Too"
2	2	"Fireworks"	Uncredited	Wayne Jackman	5 September 2006
Granny Murray takes the children, to a fireworks display at the castle. Bobby is worried for Kai, but soon has her own worries when the depot becomes a mess and Dr Juno's dog Sampson has escaped in fright. Could these two problems lead Bobby to where Sampson has run off to?: Main Character: Bobby; First appearances of Bobby's version of "Which Way Will I Go?", "Bobby Boogie Woogies" (Bobby's song) and Bobby's version of "The Race Against Time Song"
3	3	"Tummy Rumbles"	Martin Burt & Andrew Agnew	Wayne Jackman	6 September 2006
Mickey John hasn't eaten all day and is all excited for lunch. However, he soon runs into trouble when he falls asleep and forgets to eat!: Main Character: Mickey John; First appearances of Mickey John's version of "I Need to Get to Work", "School Day, Work Away" (Mickey John's song) and Mickey John's version of "The Race Against Time Song"
4	4	"I Want to See the Parade"	Martin Burt & Andrew Agnew	Wayne Jackman	7 September 2006
Dr Juno is tired of her injured patients talking about the carnival and says to them that they should forget about it. But she soon realizes that her negative attitude had caused to upset everyone, so she decides to bring the carnival to the hospital: Main Character: Dr. Juno; First appearances of Dr. Juno's version of "I Need to Get to Work", "I'm Rushing Here and There" (Dr. Juno's song) and Dr. Juno's version of "The Race Against Time Song"
5	5	"The Waterfall"	John Smith	Wayne Jackman	8 September 2006
Trouble lies for Rudi on a rainy day when he tries to find a way to get rid of the rising water over his stall.: Main Character: Rudi; First appearances of Rudi's version of "Which Way Will I Go?", "The Market" (Rudi's song) and Rudi's version of "The Race Against Time Song"
6	6	"The Puncture"	Uncredited	Wayne Jackman	11 September 2006
Granny Murray has a broken swing set. Tina thinks she could fix it, but when her Taxi gains a loose tire she may have the perfect solution for a new seat.: Main Character: Tina; First appearances of Tina's version of "Which Way Will I Go?", "Pretty Pink Taxi" (Tina's song) and Tina's version of "The Race Against Time Song"
7	7	"Bumps in the Night"	Martin Burt & Andrew Agnew	Wayne Jackman	12 September 2006
A huge wind storm is heading Riversfingal, and it's giving out a lot of issues for Bobby.: Main Character: Bobby
8	8	"Cheese and Tomato Toasties"	John Smith	Wayne Jackman	13 September 2006
Raymond makes a lot of tasty cheese toasties, but the popularity of them proves too much, as he soon runs out of bread.: Main Character: Raymond
9	9	"Paper Mountain"	Martin Burt & Paul Holmes	Penny Lloyd	14 September 2006
When Rudi suggests to Mickey John to reuse recycled paper, he ends up with a messy classroom full of wasted paper.: Main Character: Mickey John; First appearance of Mickey John's version of "Which Way Will I Go?"
10	10	"Baby"	Martin Burt & Andrew Agnew	Davey Moore	15 September 2006
Everyone is excited about the arrival of a new baby, but the father has gone missing.: Main Character: Dr. Juno; First appearance of Dr. Juno's version of "Which Way Will I Go?"
11	11	"Roadworks"	John Smith	Wayne Jackman	18 September 2006
The nearby road drillers are making Rudi's job a bit of a muddle as he cannot hear anything.: Main Character: Rudi; First appearance of Rudi's version of "I Need to Get to Work"
12	12	"The Rattle"	Uncredited	Wayne Jackman	19 September 2006
Tina thinks she can hear a carnival parade, but it turns out to be her Taxi's exhaust pipes rattling.: Main Character: Tina
13	13	"Kilts Away"	Paul Holmes	Alison Stewart	20 September 2006
Mickey John causes Raymond to have a sticky situation while en route to a bagpipe festival.: Main Character: Raymond
14	14	"I Want to Stay Up All Night"	Uncredited	Fay Woolf	21 September 2006
Kai is determined to stay up all night, and it's proving to be trouble for Granny Murray, but more importantly to Bobby!: Main Character: Bobby
15	15	"The Juicer"	Martin Burt & Andrew Agnew	Wayne Jackman	22 September 2006
Mickey John is exhausted by the hot weather, but there is no advantage to it.: Main Character: Mickey John
16	16	"Less Rush"	Martin Burt & Andrew Agnew	Davey Moore	25 September 2006
Dr Juno has a very busy day and the more she rushes, the less she seems to get done. She even forgets about a patient who needs their plaster taken off. Fortunately, Tina is there to remind her.: Main Character: Dr. Juno
17	17	"Cow Near the Line"	John Smith	Penny Lloyd	26 September 2006
A cow on the railway line causes problems on Raymond's train as he grinds to a halt, while Granny Murray takes the children to a police station.: Main Character: Raymond; First appearance of Raymond's version of "I Need to Get to Work"
18	18	"Tricks"	Unknown	Wayne Jackman	27 September 2006
A magician is performing at school, but does not have his magician's outfit or equipment with him, so Tina helps him out with what she has in the taxi.: Main Character: Tina
19	19	"Granny Murray's Potato Recipes"	Paul Holmes	Brian Ross	28 September 2006
When Granny Murray's own potato recipes from her recipe book become popular, Rudi runs out of potatoes at his stall.: Main Character: Rudi
20	20	"I Want to Say Goodnight"	Uncredited	Wayne Jackman	29 September 2006
Kai is sad to be separating from Bobby for the night so they agree to talk over the phone at bedtime. However, when she finishes the cleaning, she accidentally falls asleep on a bus and misses the call, so Bobby decides to go to Granny Murray's house to kiss him good night instead.: Main Character: Bobby; First appearance of Bobby's version of "I Need to Get to Work"
21	21	"Fruit Bus"	Martin Burt & Andrew Agnew	Brian Ross	2 October 2006
Bobby cleans the bus in preparation for a healthy eating campaign.: Main Character: Bobby
22	22	"The Operation"	Andrew Agnew	Claire Walters & Jane Kemp	3 October 2006
One of Dr. Juno's patients is nervous about an operation, so Dr. Juno washes a teddy bear to make him feel better.: Main Character: Dr. Juno
23	23	"Fantastical"	Martin Burt & Paul Holmes	Wayne Jackman	4 October 2006
Mickey John tells a story about a king and queen, and the children draw pictures of the characters.: Main Character: Mickey John
24	24	"Ratatouille"	Paul Holmes	Alison Stewart	5 October 2006
Rudi misplaces Raymond's list of ingredients for Granny Murray's ratatouille, but luckily remembers what is in it.: Main Character: Rudi
25	25	"Snooze"	Paul Holmes	Penny Lloyd	6 October 2006
Raymond goes to the beach in his lunch hour, but he falls asleep and nearly misses his train.: Main Character: Raymond
26	26	"Sports Day"	Andrew Agnew	Penny Lloyd	9 October 2006
Mickey John's school is having sports day but the weather is raining. When there is a break in the clouds, Mickey John runs out to set everything up himself.: Main Character: Mickey John
27	27	"The Airport"	Martin Burt & Andrew Agnew	Alison Stewart	10 October 2006
Tina is taking the Ferryboat Band to catch their flight. She forgets the pick-up but keeps calm and drives safely and steadily to sort it out.: Main Character: Tina
28	28	"A Funny Turn"	Unknown	Peter Hynes	11 October 2006
Dr. Juno had such a busy day that she has forgotten to eat. She starts to feel dizzy.: Main Character: Dr. Juno
29	29	"The Kiss"	John Smith	Wayne Jackman	12 October 2006
Raymond acts strangely as he awaits a visit from jazz singer Edith Budge.: Main Character: Raymond
30	30	"Fashion Show"	Martin Burt	Johanna Hall	13 October 2006
Tina delivers outfits for the college fashion show to the town hall, with a little help from Granny Murray.: Main Character: Tina; First appearance of Tina's version of "I Need to Get to Work"
31	31	"Strawberries"	Paul Holmes	Penny Lloyd	16 October 2006
Tina helps Rudi collect strawberries from Hayes Farm to sell at his stall.: Main Character: Rudi
32	32	"I Like to Laugh"	Martin Burt & Andrew Agnew	Wayne Jackman	17 October 2006
Tina cannot remember her lines for the play.: Main Character: Tina
33	33	"Hats On"	Martin Burt & Paul Holmes	Peter Hynes	18 October 2006
It is the Castle Park Hill race and Mickey John, the commentator, cannot see which runner is which. He solves his problem by getting them all to wear different hats.: Main Character: Mickey John
34	34	"Laundry"	Andrew Agnew	Wayne Jackman	19 October 2006
On laundry day, Granny Murray makes time to take the children to the rugby.: Main Character: Dr. Juno
35	35	"The Robot"	Unknown	Alison Stewart	20 October 2006
Bobby wants to get Kai a present, but runs out of time to go shopping and ends up making a simple robot instead.: Main Character: Bobby
36	36	"Popcorn Express"	Paul Holmes	Brian Ross	5 February 2007
At a cinema, Raymond adds popcorn to the buffet car menu and the customers love it, but a lot of it goes on the floor. Raymond has fun clearing it up in comical silent movie style.: Main Character: Raymond
37	37	"Find Your Way"	Unknown	Wayne Jackman	6 February 2007
Tina gets lost trying to find the way to Splash 'n' Swim and is too proud to say so. In the end, she finds it by following the signs.: Main Character: Tina
38	38	"Cricket"	Andrew Agnew	Claire Walters & Jane Kemp	7 February 2007
The children are playing ball games with Granny Murray, and Mickey John is getting organised for a special game of cricket.: Main Character: Mickey John
39	39	"Market Cries"	Unknown	Wayne Jackman	8 February 2007
Rudi has hardly sold anything in his market stall and Dale's CD music is very loud.: Main Character: Rudi
40	40	"The Pet"	Martin Burt	Davey Moore	9 February 2007
Bobby is "chosen" by an abandoned kitten so she decides to take it home and keep it as a pet.: Main Character: Bobby
41	41	"Harlequin Day"	Andrew Agnew	Peter Hynes	12 February 2007
Dr. Juno has been too busy working and sorting out the Harlequin Day to organise the opening.: Main Character: Dr. Juno
42	42	"Old and New"	Unknown	Davey Moore	13 February 2007
Mickey John compares Raymond's fast new train to old steam engines of days gone by.: Main Character: Mickey John
43	43	"Driving Lesson"	Uncredited	Peter Hynes	14 February 2007
Granny Murray shows the children many cars, and Tina takes Bobby for a driving lesson in her taxi.: Main Character: Tina
44	44	"Water, Water Everywhere"	Paul Holmes	Davey Moore	15 February 2007
There is a mix up and Raymond ends up ordering far more water than he needs for the buffet car on the train.: Main Character: Raymond
45	45	"Smiles"	Unknown	Penny Lloyd	16 February 2007
Bobby wants to get one of the bus drivers a thank-you present for always making her smile, but she forgets to go to the shops before work.: Main Character: Bobby
46	46	"Signs"	Paul Holmes	Peter Hynes	19 February 2007
Rudi has too many pears to sell so comes up with an idea to help get rid of them.: Main Character: Rudi
47	47	"Castle Rocks"	Unknown	Wayne Jackman	20 February 2007
Everyone sets off to a concert to see the Ferry Boat Band, but guest singer Dr. Juno is held up at the hospital.: Main Character: Dr. Juno
48	48	"The Fancy Dress"	Unknown	Davey Moore	21 February 2007
There is a fancy dress party in Riverseafingal, and Raymond and Bobby both borrow costumes from Tina, but problems arise when they both take the wrong costumes.: Main Character: Tina
49	49	"Give a Wave Day"	Unknown	Wayne Jackman	22 February 2007
Bobby does not realise she has been given special instructions to decorate the buses – but manages to set things right in the nick of time.: Main Character: Bobby
50	50	"Creative Train"	Paul Holmes	Peter Hynes	23 February 2007
Mess and disorganisation leave Raymond frustrated, so he sorts out the activities for the Creative Train day in the buffet car.: Main Character: Raymond
51	51	"Rubbish"	Unknown	Wayne Jackman	26 February 2007
Rudi's fruit cups are a big success with the customers, but everyone is leaving the cups on the ground when they have finished. Rudi takes action and gets the cleaners in. He also buys a bin for the stall.: Main Character: Rudi
52	52	"Parking"	Andrew Agnew	Penny Lloyd	27 February 2007
Tina wants to do her shopping and pick up Lisa from Granny Murray's, but has trouble finding a parking space.: Main Character: Tina
53	53	"Lolly Sticks"	Martin Burt & Paul Holmes	Tracey Hammett	28 February 2007
Granny Murray is taking the children to the fair today. Mickey John uses the fairground scenario to teach the children about shapes, colours and numbers.: Main Character: Mickey John
54	54	"Story Bus"	Martin Burt & Andrew Agnew	Peter Hynes	1 March 2007
Bobby makes a special picture book for Kai by using old bus adverts.: Main Character: Bobby
55	55	"Everything Has Its Place"	Paul Holmes	Wayne Jackman	2 March 2007
Mickey John muddles up all the fruit on Rudi's market stall just so it will look nice for his film. Rudi cannot find anything so has to reorganise, and fast. Granny Murray and the children also find out how important it is to be able to find things quickly when they visit the fire fighters.: Main Character: Rudi
56	56	"Disco Taxi"	Martin Burt & Andrew Agnew	Wayne Jackman	5 March 2007
On Lisa's birthday, Granny Murray is throwing her a party, but Tina worries that she will not be able to make it a special day for her.: Main Character: Tina
57	57	"The School Trip"	Paul Holmes	Johanna Hall	6 March 2007
Mickey John forgets to remind the children to bring packed lunches for the school trip, so he asks Raymond to prepare the food.: Main Character: Raymond
58	58	"The Planetarium"	Martin Burt & Paul Holmes	Penny Lloyd	7 March 2007
Granny Murray and the children look at stars through Mickey John's telescope.: Main Character: Dr. Juno
59	59	"The Clock"	Brian Ross	Wayne Jackman	8 March 2007
Mickey John is fascinated with how things work, but when he tries to understand how a clock works he breaks it and has to ask Tina for help.: Main Character: Mickey John
60	60	"Niggles"	Brian Ross	Wayne Jackman	9 March 2007
Everyone is annoyed with Raymond's grumpy mood.: Main Character: Raymond
61	61	"Midnight Dancing"	Andrew Agnew	Davey Moore	12 March 2007
Raymond and Tina are set to appear on Midnight Dancing while the Ferry Boat Band play live on TV, but Tina arrives at the Bus Depot in a panic, so Bobby needs to calm her down enough to attract Riverseafingal with her dancing.: Main Character: Bobby
62	62	"The Lost Mouse"	Unknown	Wayne Jackman	13 March 2007
Tina and Raymond are going to get Lisa a pet, but they cannot decide what to buy.: Main Character: Tina
63	63	"Silly Day"	Unknown	Glyn Evans	14 March 2007
On Silly Day in Riverseafingal, everyone is raising money for the Hospital, but all the silliness is annoying Rudi.: Main Character: Rudi
64	64	"Seaside Run"	Martin Burt	Nigel Crowle	15 March 2007
Tina forgets to get petrol for her vehicle in the rush to prepare for the taxi drivers' annual day trip to the seaside with the children.: Main Character: Tina
65	65	"The Hat Parade"	Unknown	Brian Ross	16 March 2007
The gang prepares for a hat parade at the People's Palace in the park, but Tina's headgear gets broken.: Main Character: Rudi
66	66	"Play Safe"	Martin Burt & Paul Holmes	Penny Lloyd	19 March 2007
Granny Murray takes Sampson and the children to try out skating, while Dr. Juno starts a safety campaign.: Main Character: Dr. Juno
67	67	"Running Out"	Unknown	Diane Redmond	20 March 2007
Louie is ill and Rudi is so busy looking after her, but he forgets to order stock for his stall. He runs out of things to sell, so calls on Tina for help.: Main Character: Rudi
68	68	"Painting by Numbers"	Brian Ross	Penny Lloyd	21 March 2007
Mickey John teaches how to mix colours during an art lesson.: Main Character: Mickey John
69	69	"Leaky Bus"	Martin Burt	Wayne Jackman	22 March 2007
Bobby arranges for a leaking bus to get fixed and tries to mend a broken toy for Kai.: Main Character: Bobby
70	70	"Clean Floors"	Unknown	Peter Hynes	23 March 2007
Raymond takes much pride in how clean and safe he keeps his buffet car, but when Mickey John demonstrates his steam engine to Raymond, it leaves oil on the floor.: Main Character: Raymond
71	71	"Precious"	John Smith	Davey Moore	26 March 2007
Tina visits the hospital when she gets a small ring stuck on her finger.: Main Character: Dr. Juno
72	72	"Fruit Race"	Unknown	Wayne Jackman	27 March 2007
Rudi has to decorate the finish line of the fruit race before the winner crosses it.: Main Character: Rudi
73	73	"Grumpy"	John Smith	Wayne Jackman	28 March 2007
Dr. Juno tries to cheer up a grumpy Nurse Hendry.: Main Character: Dr. Juno
74	74	"Fun with Words"	Brian Ross	Davey Moore	29 March 2007
Mickey John sends his class to sleep while teaching poetry, before calling on Tina and Raymond to help wake them up.: Main Character: Mickey John
75	75	"Fingal's Rock"	Unknown	Brian Jameson	30 March 2007
GM and the children go birdwatching at Fingal's Rock. At the hospital, Dr. Juno has a problem with people getting lost on the way to X-ray.: Main Character: Dr. Juno

=== Series 2 (2007–08) ===
No. overall	No. in series	Title	Directed by	Written by	Original release date
76	1	"Eat Your Greens"	Paul Holmes	Penny Lloyd	16 July 2007
Rudi helps Dr. Juno with a photo shoot to promote healthy eating.: Main Character: Rudi
77	2	"Sorted"	Martin Burt	Penny Lloyd	17 July 2007
Bobby discovers a birthday card has been left on one of the buses.: Main Character: Bobby
78	3	"The Fete"	Andrew Agnew	Peter Hynes	18 July 2007
Granny Murray takes the children and Sampson to the fete.: Main Character: Dr. Juno
79	4	"Gymnastic Display"	Martin Burt	Kath Yelland	19 July 2007
Tina opens Bobby's gymnastic display by performing a scarf dance.: Main Character: Tina
80	5	"Auntie's Day Out"	Martin Burt	Davey Moore	20 July 2007
Tina takes her aunt Sophie on a trip to Bruges.: Main Character: Tina; First appearance of "The Ferryboat Band Song" (Chuck and Louie's song)
81	6	"Jive Times Table"	Andrew Agnew	Davey Moore	23 July 2007
Mickey John is not looking forward to teaching his maths lesson.: Main Character: Mickey John
82	7	"Smiles and Frowns"	Paul Holmes	Wayne Jackman	24 July 2007
Raymond makes a meal and a birthday cake with candles on it for Rudi and Louie.: Main Character: Raymond
83	8	"Bags Away"	Paul Holmes	Claire Walters & Jane Kemp	25 July 2007
It is a windy day and Rudi's bags get blown away from his stall.: Main Character: Rudi
84	9	"Changing Wheel"	John Smith	Wayne Jackman	26 July 2007
Bobby discovers that one of the buses has a flat tyre.: Main Character: Bobby
85	10	"Counting Cows"	Andrew Agnew	Wayne Jackman	27 July 2007
Tina tells Granny Murray about the cowboy parade.: Main Character: Tina
86	11	"Drawing It Out"	John Smith	Peter Hynes	30 July 2007
Dr. Juno has a patient who won't tell her what is wrong.: Main Character: Dr. Juno
87	12	"The Lost Mop"	John Smith	Penny Lloyd	31 July 2007
Bobby is busy working on the buses when she gets distracted and loses her mop.: Main Character: Bobby
88	13	"Girl on a Bike"	Brian Ross	Davey Moore	1 August 2007
Tina feels very nervous about her show.: Main Character: Raymond
89	14	"Sunshine Fruit"	Andrew Agnew	Wayne Jackman	2 August 2007
The rain is making everyone feel very glum.: Main Character: Rudi
90	15	"Map"	Brian Ross	Wayne Jackman	3 August 2007
Mickey John gives his class a lesson on maps, but his class don't find it interesting.: Main Character: Mickey John
91	16	"Comfy"	Martin Burt	Wayne Jackman	6 August 2007
Tina does not realise that the seat in her taxi has burst.: Main Character: Tina
92	17	"Spooky Party"	Andrew Agnew	Penny Lloyd	7 August 2007
Mickey John hosts a Halloween party in his classroom.: Main Character: Mickey John
93	18	"Chocolate"	Martin Burt	Wayne Jackman	8 August 2007
Raymond and Mickey John visit Bruges to find new recipes for the buffet car. But Raymond forgets to get a treat for Lisa.: Main Character: Raymond
94	19	"Pirate Hospital"	Unknown	Alison Stewart	9 August 2007
The children are going to Brian's party, but he had injured his arm and now believes he won't have any fun, it's now up to Dr. Juno to get the fun back into him.: Main Character: Dr. Juno
95	20	"Good Advice"	Brian Ross	Penny Lloyd	10 August 2007
Raymond tries to sell crumbles as a snack, but people want to buy fruit instead.: Main Character: Raymond
96	21	"The Burst Water Main"	Martin Burt	Peter Hynes	13 August 2007
When a water main bursts at Rudi's stall, he has to act fast to move it.: Main Character: Rudi
97	22	"The Coffee Machine"	Andrew Agnew	Davey Moore	14 August 2007
Raymond likes his new coffee machine until it stops working.: Main Character: Raymond
98	23	"Giving"	Martin Burt	Davey Moore	15 August 2007
Mickey John is given a fir cone by Rebecca, a picture from Dr. Juno and a nature collection from Bobby.: Main Character: Mickey John
99	24	"Sunburn"	Andrew Agnew	Brian Ross	16 August 2007
It is a hot day and many people are going to Dr. Juno's hospital with sunburn.: Main Character: Dr. Juno
100	25	"Eyes and Teeth"	Jack Jameson	Wayne Jackman	17 August 2007
Bobby's teeth cleaning campaign needs brightening up.: Main Character: Bobby
101	26	"First Aid"	Andrew Agnew	Wayne Jackman	20 August 2007
Raymond grazes his arm but his first aid kit is empty.: Main Character: Raymond
102	27	"Bouncy Day"	Andrew Agnew	Peter Hynes	21 August 2007
Riverseafingal hosts a bouncing festival.: Main Character: Tina
103	28	"Making a Fuss"	Jack Jameson	Wayne Jackman	22 August 2007
When Mickey John panics that he has overreacted, Dr. Juno tries to calm him down.: Main Character: Dr. Juno
104	29	"Book Sale"	Andrew Agnew	Wayne Jackman	23 August 2007
Mickey John hosts a book sale to raise funds for the school.: Main Character: Mickey John
105	30	"Masks"	Martin Burt	Peter Hynes	24 August 2007
Tina and Raymond perform Cinderella in Bruges. But they brought paper plates instead of hats.: Main Character: Tina
106	31	"Flags"	Martin Burt	Penny Lloyd	27 August 2007
Rudi likes Mickey John's idea that everyone should learn something new every day.: Main Character: Rudi
107	32	"Form Filling"	John Smith	Peter Hynes	28 August 2007
Bobby has a lot of forms to fill in at work but does not know if she will have the time to fill them in.: Main Character: Bobby
108	33	"Football Special"	Andrew Agnew	Alison Stewart	29 August 2007
It's the day of the big football match and the buffet car is full of excited supporters. Raymond finds himself in a predicament when Mickey John arrives and wants peace and quiet.: Main Character: Raymond
109	34	"Clever Dog"	Jack Jameson	Wayne Jackman	30 August 2007
Everyone is thanking Dr. Juno for helping them by giving her gifts. When the parent of a child tells her that Sampson stopped their child from running onto the road, she doesn't know how to thank him for being a clever dog.: Main Character: Dr. Juno
110	35	"Wedding Car"	Andrew Agnew	Alison Stewart	31 August 2007
Tina takes Dr. Juno to a wedding in her taxi.: Main Character: Tina
111	36	"The Pigeon"	Jack Jameson	Penny Lloyd	4 February 2008
A pigeon gets stuck in the bus depot.: Main Character: Bobby
112	37	"Celebrity Chef"	Martin Burt	Wayne Jackman	5 February 2008
Rudi has a celebrity chef coming to his stall to do a cooking demonstration. However, when the chef refuses to ride Tina's pink taxi and leaves, Rudi is in a problem until Raymond comes to the rescue.: Main Character: Rudi
113	38	"Writing"	Andrew Agnew	Wayne Jackman	6 February 2008
Mickey John cannot read his classes' stories because he made them write them in a hurry.: Main Character: Mickey John
114	39	"The Hike"	Andrew Agnew	Davey Moore	7 February 2008
Raymond has nearly run out of food on the train and Mickey John and his cub scouts are hungry.: Main Character: Raymond
115	40	"Smelling of Roses"	Martin Burt	Davey Moore	8 February 2008
There is a horrible smell coming from Tina's taxi.: Main Character: Tina
116	41	"Clean Corridors"	Jack Jameson	Davey Moore	11 February 2008
Dr. Juno thought Bobby was wrong that her waiting room was dirty. But turns out Bobby's right and Dr. Juno's wrong.: Main Character: Dr. Juno
117	42	"Soapy"	Jack Jameson	Wayne Jackman	12 February 2008
Bobby does not realise that the bucket she is using to clean the buses is dirty.: Main Character: Bobby
118	43	"The Suitcase"	Martin Burt	Penny Lloyd	13 February 2008
Mickey John returns from his holiday but his suitcase causes problems on the train.: Main Character: Raymond
119	44	"Double Booked"	Martin Burt	Peter Hynes	14 February 2008
Tina has a new booking system for her taxi but forgets to book someone in.: Main Character: Tina
120	45	"Sorting Change"	Martin Burt	Wayne Jackman	15 February 2008
Rudi needs to visit the bank with his change before it closes.: Main Character: Rudi
121	46	"Weights and Measures"	Andrew Agnew	Wayne Jackman	18 February 2008
Mickey John teaches his children about weights and measures.: Main Character: Mickey John
122	47	"Lost"	Unknown	Davey Moore	19 February 2008
Dr. Juno is on a charity bike ride on the continent when her sat nav device starts speaking French.: Main Character: Dr. Juno; Final appearance of Dr. Juno's version of "I Need to Get to Work"
123	48	"Sharing Your Troubles"	Andrew Agnew	Peter Hynes	20 February 2008
Dr. Juno's patient, Tina’s niece, does not want her sore knee to be examined.: Main Character: Dr. Juno
124	49	"Panic"	Martin Burt	Alison Stewart	21 February 2008
Raymond keeps panicking over the slightest task and then a cat runs loose on the train.: Main Character: Raymond
125	50	"Watching Foxes"	Unknown	Wayne Jackman	22 February 2008
A wildlife programme is being filmed at the bus depot, but when the equipment is dismantled it looks like the show might not go on.: Main Character: Bobby
126	51	"The Panto"	Martin Burt	Wayne Jackman	25 February 2008
Raymond has problems getting to Drumtown for his panto because of train problems.: Main Character: Tina
127	52	"Trolley's"	Martin Burt	Peter Hynes	26 February 2008
Stripey shopping trollies are very popular in Riverseafingal, which causes a bit of a mix-up. However, Rudi solves the problem.: Main Character: Rudi
128	53	"Castles and Knights"	Andrew Agnew	Alison Stewart	27 February 2008
Mickey John's guest speaker fails to turn up.: Main Character: Mickey John
129	54	"Pairs"	Andrew Agnew	Davey Moore	28 February 2008
On a cold day, many people are losing their gloves and scarves.: Main Character: Bobby
130	55	"Birds Eye View"	Martin Burt	Wayne Jackman	29 February 2008
Mickey John is taking his photography group to Bruges and Granny Murray wants to see a bird's eye view of the city.: Main Character: Mickey John
131	56	"Don't Touch"	Andrew Agnew	Wayne Jackman	3 March 2008
Dr. Juno gives a talk to Mickey John's class about dangers in the home.: Main Character: Dr. Juno
132	57	"Helping Hand"	Paul Holmes	Davey Moore	4 March 2008
Raymond is working on a train called the Picnic Express and Tina tries to help him.: Main Character: Raymond
133	58	"Waiting Room"	Martin Burt	Penny Lloyd	5 March 2008
It is raining and there is a queue for Tina's taxi.: Main Character: Tina
134	59	"Exotic Fruit"	Martin Burt	Penny Lloyd	6 March 2008
Nobody is interested in the exotic fruit being sold on Rudi's stall.: Main Character: Rudi
135	60	"Night and Day"	Martin Burt	Wayne Jackman	7 March 2008
Mickey John has problems explaining the difference between night and day to the children.: Main Character: Mickey John
136	61	"Be Seen"	Jack Jameson	Penny Lloyd	10 March 2008
Dr. Juno asks Bobby to distribute some leaflets on the buses about night safety.: Main Character: Bobby
137	62	"Birthday Socks"	Andrew Agnew	Davey Moore	11 March 2008
Mickey John wants to show his class how things have changed since he was a boy.: Main Character: Mickey John
138	63	"Packed Lunches"	Martin Burt	Penny Lloyd	12 March 2008
Raymond sells new lunchboxes on the train. But when he notices that Kai and Bobby left their new lunchbox inside, he realises there's no point leaving it empty.: Main Character: Raymond
139	64	"Taxi Lanes"	Martin Burt	Penny Lloyd	13 March 2008
Tina gets stuck in a traffic jam.: Main Character: Tina; Final appearance of Tina's version of "Which Way Will I Go?"
140	65	"Chatterbox"	Martin Burt	Davey Moore	14 March 2008
Rudi earns money to buy a new jacket for Jack.: Main Character: Rudi; Final appearance of Rudi's version of "Which Way Will I Go?"
141	66	"The Lost Phone"	Martin Burt	Wayne Jackman	17 March 2008
Raymond has a new phone, which he is very proud of. When he leaves it on a train, he is in a panic to get it back.: Main Character: Raymond; Final appearances of Raymond's version of "Which Way Will I Go?" and "I Love My Train" (Raymond's song)
142	67	"The Chef"	Martin Burt	Brian Ross	18 March 2008
Raymond goes to the continent for a cookery lesson.: Main Character: Raymond; Final appearances of Raymond's version of "I Need to Get to Work", "The Ferry Boat Band Song" (Chuck and Louie's song) and Raymond's version of "The Race Against Time Song"
143	68	"Thunder"	Andrew Agnew	Davey Moore	19 March 2008
Bobby is scared of the thunderstorm that arrives in Riverseafingal.: Main Character: Bobby; Final appearance of Bobby's version of "I Need to Get to Work"
144	69	"Gadgets"	Martin Burt	Penny Lloyd	20 March 2008
Mickey John gives a talk to his class about Roman gadgets.: Main Character: Mickey John; Final appearance of Mickey John's version of "I Need to Get to Work"
145	70	"Chilly Day"	Jack Jameson	Davey Moore	21 March 2008
It is a cold day, so Dr. Juno wants to ensure that everyone wraps up warmly.: Main Character: Dr. Juno
146	71	"A Joke Too Far"	Martin Burt	Wayne Jackman	24 March 2008
It is tell-a-joke day and Rudi takes advantage of the day with many jokes, but when he upsets Dr. Juno, he realises he went as bit too far.: Main Character: Rudi; Final appearances of Rudi's version of "I Need to Get to Work", "The Market" (Rudi's song) and Rudi's version of "The Race Against Time Song"
147	72	"Ditched"	Martin Burt	Wayne Jackman	25 March 2008
When Tina's taxi rolls into a ditch she needs assistance to remove it.: Main Character: Tina; Final appearances of Tina's version of "I Need to Get to Work", "Pretty Pink Taxi" (Tina's song) and Tina's version of "The Race Against Time Song"
148	73	"Bumped"	Andrew Agnew	Davey Moore	26 March 2008
One of Dr. Juno's patients is not recovering well so she asks Raymond for assistance.: Main Character: Dr. Juno; Final appearances of Dr. Juno's version of "Which Way Will I Go?", "I'm Rushing Here and There" (Dr. Juno's song) and Dr. Juno's version of "The Race Against Time Song"
149	74	"Paper Football"	Martin Burt	Wayne Jackman	27 March 2008
Mickey John's class are due to play a game of football but when the time comes for the game, the weather is so wet that they can't play. Mickey John decides that the game can still go ahead and he moves it indoors.: Main Character: Mickey John; Penultimate appearances of "Who's Home?" and "My Time Too"; Final appearances of Mickey John's version of "Which Way Will I Go?", "School Day, Work Away" (Mickey John's song) and Mickey John's version of "The Race Against Time Song"
150	75	"Snoring"	Andrew Agnew	Penny Lloyd	28 March 2008
Bobby is frightened by strange noises in the bus depot, but she investigates.: Main Character: Bobby; Final appearances of "Who's Home?", Bobby's version of "Which Way Will I Go?", "Bobby Boogie Woogies" (Bobby's song), Bobby's version of "The Race Against Time Song" and "My Time Too"

== Places ==
Within Riverseafingal, there are many locations:

- Granny Murray's House (22 Kingsborough Gardens Glasgow, Scotland)
- Castle Market (Edinburgh Farmers' Market)
- The Castle (Edinburgh Castle)
- Harlequin Hospital (The Gherkin)
- Roundhouse Primary School (Gourock Primary School)
- Riverseafingal Bus Depot (Lothian Buses)
- Taxi Garage (The Arch Company)
- Train Station (Edinburgh Waverley railway station) and Train buffet car (set on a GNER Mark 4 train)
- The Ferryboat (Superfast)

== Home media releases ==
BBC Worldwide released a DVD titled "Welcome to the City!" in July 2008, containing six episodes.
