= Fear Street Part Two: 1978 (soundtrack) =

Film score by Marco Beltrami and Brandon Roberts
- Released: July 9, 2021
- Recorded: 2021
- Genre: Film score
- Length: 44:54
- Labels: Maisie Music Publishing; Milan

Marco Beltrami chronology
Fear Street Part One: 1994 (2021)	Fear Street Part Two: 1978 (2021)	Fear Street Part Three: 1666 (2021)

Brandon Roberts chronology
Chaos Walking (2021)	Fear Street Part Two: 1978 (2021)	On a Wing and a Prayer (2023)

Fear Street Part Two: 1978 (Music from the Netflix Trilogy) is the film score soundtrack to the 2021 film Fear Street Part Two: 1978, the second instalment in the Fear Street trilogy and a continuation to Fear Street Part One: 1994. The musical score is composed by Marco Beltrami and Brandon Roberts who produced an orchestral score that resembled of the 1970s horror films. The album was released by Maisie Music Publishing and Milan Records on July 9, 2021.

== Background ==
Marco Beltrami, who previously scored the predecessor, joined with Brandon Roberts to compose music for Part Two: 1978. The score for the film is mostly influenced from 1970s horror films, and its main inspiration is from the compositions of Jerry Goldsmith, whom Beltrami was tutored under during his period at the USC Thornton School of Music in Los Angeles. As Goldsmith's music had a heavy influence on the soundscape for the film, Beltrami emulated an orchestral composition for the same. The other influences of the score were from composer Harry Manfredini and his work in Friday the 13th series.

== Release ==
The soundtrack to Part Two: 1978 was released through Maisie Music Publishing and Milan Records on July 9, 2021, alongside the film. A triple album was published by Waxwork Records featuring music from the predecessor and its sequel was released on November 12.

== Reception ==
Jonathan Broxton in his review for Movie Music UK wrote "Marco Beltrami and Brandon Roberts have crafted a score which plays wonderful homage to so many of those iconic 1970s slashers, especially through the action music, which is as vibrant and intense and orchestrally sophisticated as anything written in that period." Nick Allen of RogerEbert.com described it as an "excellent score which elevates the intensity with a demonic chorus and frantic horn section". Ian Freer of Empire called it as a "full-on, choral-driven score".

Lovia Gyarkye of The Hollywood Reporter called it as "exhillarating". Maxance Vincent of CGMagazine wrote "Composers Marco Beltrami and Brandon Roberts bring in an operatic, almost bombastic score when "shit hits the fan" (for a lack of better words), and absolutely slay the house down. There's nothing quite like seeing a score filled with a choir to have some form of emotional levity during the kills." Anya Stanley of The Playlist wrote "Brandon Roberts and longtime Wes Craven collaborator Marco Beltrami serve a thrilling score that swells along with the rising stakes".

== Track listing ==
=== Standard edition ===
Fear Street Part Two: 1978 (Music from the Netflix Trilogy) standard edition track listing
No.	Title	Length
1.	"Cindy and Ziggy"	1:33
2.	"Chased Through the Woods" (co-composed by Buck Sanders)	2:00
3.	"Sisters"	4:19
4.	"Crazy Eyes"	1:36
5.	"Tommy Turns"	1:48
6.	"Girl from Shadyside"	1:22
7.	"Finding the Diary"	1:51
8.	"Heart of Darkness"	1:11
9.	"Camper Chum"	1:30
10.	"Sarah Wants Candy"	1:38
11.	"Chop, Chop"	2:41
12.	"Snake on a Floor"	1:54
13.	"Witch Blob"	1:51
14.	"Witch's Mark"	0:59
15.	"Outhousin'"	1:39
16.	"I've Been a Bad Sister"	2:18
17.	"Blood Will Fall"	1:39
18.	"Meeting House"	1:21
19.	"Give Her a Hand"	2:45
20.	"The Final Axe"	1:50
21.	"Sisters United"	1:31
Total length:		39:16

=== Intrada expanded edition ===
Intrada Records published a 5-CD box set on August 2, 2024, that featured the complete score and previously unreleased material from all the three films. The film score was featured in "Disc 3" which consisted of 38 tracks running for 72 minutes.

Fear Street Part Two: 1978 (Music from the Netflix Trilogy) expanded edition track listing
No.	Title	Length
1.	"Opening"	2:32
2.	"Our Last Chance"	2:46
3.	"Chased Through the Woods"	2:05
4.	"Cut Down"	0:48
5.	"Nurse Attacks"	3:07
6.	"Crazy Eyes"	1:40
7.	"Cindy and Ziggy"	1:38
8.	"Finding the Diary"	1:55
9.	"Searching the Woods"	3:41
10.	"Sarah Got Candy?"	3:14
11.	"Tommy Turns ... Better Run"	3:13
12.	"Who Are You?"	0:28
13.	"Gonna Die Down Here"	0:57
14.	"Alice Mad"	1:15
15.	"Witch's Mark"	1:02
16.	"Property of Shadyside"	0:44
17.	"Here's Tommy"	1:02
18.	"Girl from Shadyside"	1:23
19.	"Remembering Boyfriends"	1:52
20.	"Witch Blob"	1:56
21.	"Bedroom Lays"	1:22
22.	"I've Been a Bad Sister"	2:21
23.	"Game Over"	1:08
24.	"Outhousin'"	1:57
25.	"Camper Chum"	1:34
26.	"Chop Chop"	2:43
27.	"Snake on a Floor"	1:58
28.	"Meeting House"	1:26
29.	"Blood Will Fall"	1:44
30.	"The Final Axe"	1:53
31.	"Sisters United"	1:36
32.	"Alice's Plan"	0:46
33.	"Give Her a Hand"	2:47
34.	"Heart of Darkness"	1:15
35.	"Sisters"	4:29
36.	"We Found Sarah Fier"	3:08
37.	"1666 Teaser"	1:32
38.	"Give Her a Hand" (alternate)	1:23
Total length:		72:20

== Additional music ==
In addition to the score, the film featured a compilation of licensed music from the 1970s which are contributed by David Bowie, Cat Stevens, The Velvet Underground and Blue Öyster Cult amongst others. Though a separate soundtrack not released, Netflix compiled an official playlist of the songs which would be available to stream on Spotify.

List of songs featured in the film:

- Nirvana – "The Man Who Sold the World"
- Neil Diamond – "Brother Love's Travelling Salvation Show"
- Captain & Tennille – "Love Will Keep Us Together"
- The Runaways – "Cherry Bomb"
- Jordyn DiNatale – "You Always Hurt the One You Love"
- Cat Stevens – "Bitter Blue"
- Cat Stevens – "The First Cut Is the Deepest"
- Blue Öyster Cult – "(Don't Fear) The Reaper"
- David Bowie – "Moonage Daydream"
- Kansas – "Carry On Wayward Son"
- Buzzcocks – "Ever Fallen in Love (With Someone You Shouldn't've)"
- Thelma Houston – "Don't Leave Me This Way"
- The Velvet Underground – "Sweet Jane"
- Foghat – "Slow Ride"
- David Bowie – "The Man Who Sold the World"
