= Fags, Mags and Bags =

Scottish radio comedy

- Genre: Comedy
- Running time: 30 minute episodes
- Country of origin: Scotland
- Language: English
- Home station: BBC Radio 4
- Starring: Sanjeev Kohli; Donald McLeary; Susheel Kumar; Omar Raza
- Directed by: Iain Davidson; Colin Gilbert
- Produced by: Gus Beattie
- Edited by: Niall Clark (script)
- Original release: 1 October 2007 – 22 December 2025
- No. of series: 11
- No. of episodes: 59
- Audio format: Stereophonic sound
- Website: Fags, Mags and Bags homepage

Fags, Mags and Bags is a Scottish radio comedy broadcast on BBC Radio 4. Its first series was nominated for a Sony Radio Award.

The writers, Sanjeev Kohli and Donald McLeary, received a Writers Guild Award in November 2008 for Radio Comedy of the Year.

The theme music for the show is "Smiling" by the Beta Band. In September 2017 the producer Gus Beattie revealed the list of other tracks considered for the theme, which included songs by The Go! Team, The Fratellis and The Breeders, among many others.

On 4 October 2013 it was announced on the Official Facebook page that the episode "Meter Reading Chic" would be the final episode of the show. On 4 January 2016 however, it was announced that following a hiatus of three years the show would be returning for a sixth series, that was recorded in February and broadcast in April of that year. A seventh series was announced in June 2017 consisting of 4 episodes, broadcast in August and September 2017. Since then, it has been recommissioned for four more series, which were broadcast in 2018, 2020, 2022 and 2024 respectively. A one-off final episode aired on 22 December 2025.

== Cast ==
- Sanjeev Kohli as Ramesh Majhu
- Donald McLeary as Dave Legg
- Omar Raza as Sanjay Majhu
- Kayvan Novak as Alok Majhu (series 1)
- Susheel Kumar as Alok Majhu (series 2-)

Recurring guest cast:

- Gerard Kelly as Father Henderson (Series 1–3)
- Michael Redmond as Bishop Briggs
- Tom Urie as frequent guest, many different roles
- Leah MacRae as Keenan's mum, Kate, Susan (series 1)
- Michele Gallagher as Gillian, Keenan's mum (series 2)
- Maureen Carr as Keenan's mum (series 3)
- Marjorie Hogarth as Mrs Begg/Gibb
- Julie Wilson Nimmo as Lovely Sue
- Kate Brailsford as Hilly Bewerdine
- Steven McNicoll as Bra Jeff
- Sean Scanlan as Mutton Jeff
- Stewart Cairns as Gay Alan, Mrs Birkett
- Greg McHugh as Keith Futures
- Mina Anwar as Malcolm
- Gavin Mitchell as Nathan Lazar
- Manjot Sumal as Grebo

== Characters ==
Ramesh Majhu

Ramesh is a middle-aged shopkeeper, born in India but a long-term resident of the Glasgow suburb of Lenzie. He has been the proprietor of the local convenience store Fags, Mags & Bags for over 30 years. In the episode 'Evil Narbara' from series four, Ramesh reveals that he opened the store on the same day the Double Decker chocolate bar was launched. This would place the opening of Fags, Mags & Bags in 1976.

Ramesh pursues his chosen career in low-return retail with a near religious zeal, possessing an encyclopaedic knowledge of product lines and a deft line in banter, seeing his shop as a microcosm of life. Twenty years hard "shop" has earned Ramesh a tan Mercedes and a pair of mushroom-coloured tasselled loafers.

Despite a ceaseless quest for the secondary purchase, and organising a fictional festival solely to boost sales, Ramesh seems to genuinely have his customers' interests at heart. He is popular with fellow shopkeepers; chairing the local Traders' Association, and also won the coveted 'Shopkeeper of the Year Award' in the Small-to-Medium Retail Concern category in Series 2.

Ramesh is a widower, having married his wife in an arranged marriage during the 1960s. By the end of series 5 Ramesh had begun a relationship with a lady called Malcolm. This initially progresses slowly due to Ramesh's nerves and unwillingness to commit following his wife's death, but they eventually become engaged and then married in series 9.

It is revealed that he has no sense of smell, and is a fan of the TV show Lost. Ramesh also experimented with a perm at one point in homage to the tennis star John McEnroe.

Dave Legg

Dave is Ramesh's best friend and assistant at Fags, Mags & Bags. An amiable man in his forties, he has worked for Ramesh for many years and shares his enthusiasm for all things "shop" and the music of Barbara Dickson.

Despite his easy-going nature, Dave is periodically beset by anxieties about his job and status; suffering a full scale breakdown, brought on by Ramesh's mother-in-law. It was also revealed early on that despite his skill in the art of shopkeeping, he is unable to mind the store on his own; for reasons as yet undisclosed. He appears to be a widower, like Ramesh, as he made a reference to his wife's death certificate in the series 4 episode "Foam Wizards". He seems to have had children, as he mentions receiving Father's Day gifts in "The Festival of Maltodextrin", but they are never hinted at again. Dave briefly dated a pet psychologist named Kate during the second series, and almost began a relationship with a man named Leslie in series 7, having believed he was a woman (Lesley) when they met online. Dave and Leslie forged a genuine bond, but advice from Ramesh made Dave realise he was inadvertently leading Leslie on, as he could never have romantic feelings for him.

Dave has a talent for creating compound words, and also attempted to popularise the catchphrase Five Alive with limited success.

Alok Majhu

Ramesh's elder son sees himself as a forward thinking entrepreneur and tends to conduct conversations in marketing jargon. Alok views his father's low-return empire with disdain and is engaged in an ongoing and futile attempt to drag his father's shop upmarket.

Alok has a vastly over inflated sense of his abilities as a businessman and his ventures such as the Lembit Opik Pita Heater invariably meet with disaster. This was particularly apparent in the episode "The Wrath Of Khan" when Alok's decision to install a Slush Machine led to a full scale retail war with the cafe at the Lenzie Leisuredome.

This unwillingness to master the day to day realities of running a suburban confectioners causes Ramesh amusement and despair in equal measure, and he is unwilling to leave Alok in charge of the shop for prolonged periods; for example, whilst he goes away on a murder mystery weekend with fellow shopkeepers. Ramesh's refusal to allow him to take a more active role in the business is equally frustrating for Alok, to the point that, at one stage, he becomes engaged to a highly unpleasant woman called Sadiqa, purely to in the hope of taking over her father's shop empire, Pennywise. He also briefly goes into business with Ramesh's estranged brother running stag parties, but this collapses when he is discovered to be on the run from significant debts.

Sanjay Majhu

Ramesh's youngest son is in his late teens when the show begins, and shares his brother's disdain for the world of low-return retail. However, unlike Alok, this is due to teenage apathy and general surliness rather than a desire to pursue a high flying business career. Sanjay litters his conversation with SMS language and contemporary slang and treats customers with scarcely disguised indifference. He also follows fashion and cultural fads to an extreme degree, dismissing anything he believes is no longer a hot trend as "hashtag pure granny-fied". He is described by Alok as looking like "the Cookie Monster's mum".

Despite this, Sanjay displays some flair for shopkeeping in "The De-Magowaning of Ramesh" where he successfully sells several secondary purchases. Sanjay also manages to show an aptitude for tabloid style reporting during work experience at a local newspaper, but with characteristic lack of tact manages to alienate Ramesh's customers and fellow shopkeepers by printing scurrilous stories about them.

For many years, Sanjay claims to be undertaking various college courses, having apparently dropped out of several before starting a new one. However, in the episode "A Song for Lenzie", it is revealed Sanjay has never attended any of these courses, and has actually spent his time busking in an attempt to develop a music career. This leads to Ramesh briefly throwing him out, before the two reconcile after Sanjay pens a competition-winning hymn, "God is in Your Handbag", for Songs of Praise.

In early episodes, Sanjay shows an interest in girls and briefly has a girlfriend, but in later episodes it is heavily implied that he has romantic feelings for his male best friend, Grebo. In the final episode of series 10, Sanjay confesses his love to Grebo and the two begin dating. However, in the opening episode of series 11, they break up, having struggled to make the transition from friendship to relationship - and because Grebo has been paying to watch explicit videos of someone called "Backshop Boy" on OnlyFans (who is actually Alok, although Sanjay fails to realise this).

Malcolm

First appearing in the final episode of series four, Malcolm becomes Ramesh's girlfriend, and later his fiancée, and eventually his wife in series 10. They first meet when she supplies Ramesh with greeting cards, specialising in non-landmark birthdays. Malcolm is a kindly woman who takes on many other projects during the series, including a food bank, foster caring and counselling. Ramesh is initially more reticent to get serious than Malcolm, struggling with guilt over moving on from his late wife, but things progress when he becomes jealous of Malcolm's interest in Lenzie's new butcher, Nathan Lazer (unaware that Nathan is actually gay). Alok and especially Sanjay are initially unhappy about their father's relationship with Malcolm, but eventually come to at least tolerate her.

Malcolm has something of a verbal tic where she will only use half a phrase or expression; for example, describing herself as "Happy as" or "Excited as", or dismissing an insult as "Water off" [a duck's back]. Her traditionally masculine name, often commented on, is apparently the result of her parents having wanted a boy and having already purchased items emblazoned with the name Malcolm. When she and Ramesh are planning their wedding, she allocates a seat at the top table to her brother, Barbara.

== Episodes ==
=== Series 1 (2007) ===
1. "Raising Keenan": Ramesh is keen that young tearaway Keenan has good male role models. His solution is to engineer a meeting with potential suitors for Keenan's mum.
2. "The De-Magowaning of Ramesh": Ramesh is delighted as he teaches his son Sanjay some of the finer arts of shopkeeping. But is his eagerness only because he wants to borrow his dad's Merc?
3. "Wall of Crisps": A new corn and maize-based snack sparks trouble in the corner shop.
4. "Build The Titanic": Corner shop customer Mrs Muirhead's part-work magazine model ship faces stormy waters.
5. "The Festival of Maltodextrin": Ramesh concocts a fake religious festival to shift unsold fireworks.
6. "January February": Trouble brews when Ramesh agrees to let a member of the UKRP ("United Kingdom Racist Party") put a poster up in his shop window, but Ramesh has the last laugh.

=== Series 2 (2008) ===
1. "Beansy, Beansy, Beansy, Beansy, Beansy": Ramesh and Dave come to the rescue after a number of local cats go missing.
2. "Skeletor Attack": Ramesh's life is turned upside down when his elderly and despised mother-in-law turns up uninvited. (featuring Nina Wadia as Skeletor)
3. "Rameshtonite": Trouble looms for Ramesh as his banter-nemesis Tom Skilliter re-appears after 20 years.
4. "All the Best": Lenzie turns feral after Ramesh sells cards with abusive messages to the locals.
5. "Cousin Wacko": Ramesh's nephew arrives from India, complete with impressive shopkeeping skills, much to Alok's disgust.
6. "Confectionary McEnroe": Tensions run high as Ramesh gears up for the Shopkeeper of the Year award.

=== Series 3 (2010) ===
1. "Jack Black's Black Jacks": Sanjay finds a girlfriend and embraces the arts, much to Ramesh and Dave's amusement.
2. "Mr Majhu Goes To Lenzie": Ramesh inadvertently enters the murky world of Lenzie politics.
3. "The Wrath Of Khan": The delicate eco-balance of the shop is at stake as Ramesh caves to Alok's idea of installing a slush machine.
4. "The Lenzie Splicer": Dave is thrown into turmoil after an old school friend appears in the shop.
5. "Bacon Punctuation": The future of the shop's much-loved 'Wall of Crisps' comes under threat.
6. "The Fall of Phallon and the Rise of Bugatox": Ramesh takes it upon himself to reunite a local couple who have split up.

=== Series 4 (2011) ===
1. "Foam Wizards": Ramesh and Alok go head-to-head in a sweetie design competition.
2. "Magical Mister Murgatroyd": Alok announces his sudden engagement to Siddiqua, the daughter of the owner of the local Pennywise retail empire and shop rival to Ramesh. But is it love that is driving Alok, or the promise of a gadget-filled backshop?
3. "The Bewerdine Spectrum": Sanjay causes chaos in Lenzie when he starts work experience at the local paper.
4. "Evil Narbara": The local traders are in revolt after a rowdy party shop opens in Lenzie.
5. "Ayabassa Alan": The new dance craze of Ayabassa sweeps Lenzie, and Dave finds a new friend.
6. "John Craven's Fjällräven": Dave and the boys organise a surprise 50th birthday party for Ramesh, but will Sanjay manage to keep his trap closed long enough without spilling the beans before the big day?

=== Series 5 (2012) ===
1. "Hovering Chops": The arrival of a new butcher's shop causes strife in the traders' community.
2. "General Whitesnake Demeanour": The new priest in Lenzie, Father Green, is under scrutiny from the bishop. Note: Father Neil Green was named after long time fan of the show Neil Green.
3. "Effervescent Members": Local headmistress Mrs Temple tackles Ramesh over a new range of sweets.
4. "Carnaptious Scroosh": Mrs Birkett locks horns with Lovely Sue, while Alok and Sanjay find a new cool friend.
5. "Turn Around Dave Eyes": Dave starts chatting online and Ramesh has a wobble about an upcoming date.
6. "Meter Reading Chic": Ramesh decides it is time to ponder retirement from the corner shop game.

=== Series 6 (2016) ===
1. "Chickpea Landslide": Ramesh's girlfriend opens a food bank in Lenzie, but she has got competition.
2. "Schrödinger's Birkenstock Interface Situation": A church-organised community choir-off results in a Fifa-esque bribery scandal.
3. "Glamper, Camper, Pamper, Hamper": Keenan discovers a talent at Badminton and becomes a local Lenziden hero.
4. "Crispquilibrium": The Wall of Crisps is embroiled in a political scandal.
5. "Downton Abbey Voice Changer Helmet": Mutton Jeff finds love. The only hiccup - she's a vegan.
6. "Operation Voldemort Scrape-Away": Ramesh and Malcolm's relationship moves up a gear which prompts Dave to try online dating.

=== Series 7 (2017) ===
1. "Burger, Burger, Burger, Burger, Burger": In this opening episode, we pick up on Dave's relationship with his best friend Leslie (Simon Greenall). Does Dave see a future in the friendship, and what does Lenzie think of his blossoming bromance?
2. "Wizardy Lizardy Gubbins": Local psychic and futurologist Keith Futures (Greg McHugh) finds it hard to find a buyer for his Komodo Dragon. Meanwhile, Mrs Birkett mourns the passing of her beloved cat, Biscuits.
3. "Cumulus Nimbus": Alok's former best friend at school returns to Lenzie to host a film audition. Fraser Linlithgow (Sean Biggerstaff) is now a big hit in Hollywood, and Alok is keen to cash in on his fame.
4. "Begrudging a Crunchie": Malcolm surprises Ramesh by announcing she wants to become a Foster carer.

=== Series 8 (2018) ===
1. "A Song for Lenzie": Ramesh discovers to his horror that Sanjay hasn't been entirely truthful about his college education after The Bish spots him busking in East Kilbride.
2. "The Rubington's Doobery 9000": Ramesh gets his fiancé Malcolm jealous when it's revealed that the Cash and Carry promotions manager, Helena, fancies him.
3. "Lenzie Has Fallen": Mrs Birkett raises suspicions about the source of a lurgy outbreak in Lenzie and starts to point an accusing finger at Hilly.
4. "Ladychase": The local Provost for Lenzie needs help to raise funds to create a tourist attraction for the town.

=== Series 9 (2020) ===
1. "Hamster Gamut": Ramesh is delighted that the new Lenzie House Of Wax is proving a hit as stock has been flying off the shelves. But not everyone is happy with the number of visitors to the town.
2. "Bishop's Finger": Ramesh gets jealous after his fiancée Malcolm gets closer to Lenzie's new Hipster butcher, Nathan Laser, after he sponsors her new women's football team.
3. "The Mike Leigh Theory": Dave introduces his new girlfriend Margot, but not everyone is convinced.
4. "Soup Murder": Ramesh and Malcolm's wedding day plans upset a few people, including Sanjay who wants to perform at the reception with his new horrible band.

=== Series 10 (2022) ===
1. "Racismpalooza": Ramesh tries to help Mrs Birkett who is being pursued by the immigration services.
2. "Jeff Capes Five Egger": Dave tries to make friends with Pummie, his food delivery driver - but has he crossed the customer/delivery driver friend line?
3. "Full Five Pencil Belter": Jemima Rocking-Horse, the new curator of the Lenzie House of Wax, is angry that Fags, Mags & Bags is taking their trade away.
4. "Florence Flouncingtons who lives in Flouncingtons Quadrant on the Flouncingtons Estate": Sanjay causes a bit of gossip amongst the Lenzidens as he helps his best mate Grebo with a secret mission.

=== Series 11 (2024) ===
1. "Pump Rubicon": Sanjay's relationship with Grebo has hit the rocks but can Malcolm help?
2. "Grumpy-Pumpy Doo-Dah McGraw": Bishop Briggs has a crisis of faith - but a dark force lurks in Lenzie.
3. "Ramesh-Pocalypse": Ramesh sees the return of a troublesome sibling who wreaks havoc in Lenzie.
4. "Alok-Pocalyse": Danny and Alok's stag and hen party business is still causing chaos in Lenzie, and the Local Traders are on the warpath.
5. "Priesty Weisty Hooversy Stairsy": Bishop Briggs has The Archbishop on his tail as he must audition for Lenzie's Got Wedding and is up against Malcolm.
6. "Shopnucopia": Ramesh and Dave's annual stocktake takes an unusual musical twist.

"Habda-Geddon", a one-off final episode recorded live at Òran Mór in Glasgow, was broadcast on Radio 4 on 22 December 2025.

== Guest appearances ==
The show has featured guest stars in a number of episodes:

- Nina Wadia (EastEnders, Goodness Gracious Me)
- Ron Donachie (Titanic)
- Greg McHugh (Gary: Tank Commander)
- Sean Biggerstaff (Harry Potter (film series))
- Tom Urie (River City)
- Maureen Carr (Still Game)
- Michael Redmond (Father Ted)
- Sylvester McCoy (Doctor Who, The Hobbit)
- Hardeep Singh Kohli (presenter, brother of Sanjeev Kohli)
- Kevin Eldon (Nighty Night)
- Barry Howard (Hi-De-Hi)
- Julie T. Wallace (The Fifth Element)
- David Kay (Mordrin McDonald: 21st Century Wizard)
- Julia Deakin (Spaced)
- Simon Greenall (I'm Alan Partridge)
- Lorraine McIntosh (Deacon Blue)

== Live shows ==
On 13 March 2013 the official Facebook page for the series announced a live show was to be performed towards the end of April 2013. On 9 April it was confirmed to be taking place on Tuesday 30 April 2013 at Oran Mor, in Glasgow. The two episodes that were performed, as live readings, were "Hovering Chops" and "Meter Reading Chic", both from series 5. The readings contained extra material that had been cut from the radio versions. Stewart Cairns took on the role of Frank Butcher in "Hovering Chops", that had originally been played by Barry Howard. In August 2017, Sanjeev and Donald stated in an interview that they were in the early stages of planning a touring live show. On 23 April 2019 Sanjeev Kohli announced that a live show would be taking place throughout the 2019 Edinburgh Festival Fringe, again in the form of script readings. The Fringe run was an adapted version of the episode "Meter Reading Chic", extended to run to an hour long performance.
