= Fear Street Part Three: 1666 (soundtrack) =

Film score by Marco Beltrami, Anna Drubich and Marcus Trumpp
- Released: July 16, 2021
- Recorded: 2021
- Genre: Film score
- Length: 44:54
- Labels: Maisie Music Publishing; Milan

Marco Beltrami chronology
Fear Street Part Two: 1978 (2021)	Fear Street Part Three: 1666 (2021)	American Night (2021)

Anna Drubich chronology
Werewolves Within (2021)	Fear Street Part Three: 1666 (2021)	Navalny (2022)

Marcus Trumpp chronology
Fear Street Part One: 1994 (2021)	Fear Street Part Three: 1666 (2021)	Plane (2023)

Fear Street Part Three: 1666 (Music from the Netflix Trilogy) is the film score soundtrack to the 2021 film Fear Street Part Three: 1666, the third instalment in the Fear Street trilogy, following Fear Street Part One: 1994 and Part Two: 1978. The film is jointly scored by Marco Beltrami, Anna Drubich and Marcus Trumpp.

Since the film is set in the 17th century, that did not have any musical references to construct the soundscape; the film's score was composed with a medieval touch with Drubich experimenting on the instrumentation and sounds providing an eerie and raw sound. Trumpp's contribution was only for the film's second half as that particular episode continues from Part One: 1994.

Maisie Music Publishing and Milan Records distributed the soundtrack on July 16, 2021, in conjunction with the film's release.

== Development ==
Marco Beltrami returned to score music for Part Three: 1666, after previously doing so for the predecessors. Anna Drubich and Marcus Trumpp joined as co-composers, the latter had also work with Beltrami on Part One: 1994.

Unlike the first two films, the score for Part Three: 1666 did not have a particular influence of the sound from the 17th century. Hence, Drubich was tasked to produce an atonal, ritualistic type of sound that mostly had a medieval vibe. She collected the samples of the sounds, with the help of donkey jawbones and shell shakers recorded in her one voice. Those collections and a nonet of instruments were recorded at the Abbey Road Studios in London, as she wanted to bring an eerie and raw sound, as an orchestral music would give a completely different sound.

Drubich scored an intimate sound for a romantic sequence with the two characters. She then used the cello for the evil theme. The second half of the film was scored by Trumpp as it continued with Part One: 1994; hence, she weaved in a comedy theme that transitions into a serious score at the end of the film. She was inspired by Midsommar and its soundtrack for developing the score, but however, she tried embracing the witchcraft theme of the episode.

== Release ==
The soundtrack to Part Three: 1666 was released day-and-date with the film on July 16, 2021, through Maisie Music Publishing and Milan Records. The album, along with the scores of the predecessors, was published in triple LP by Waxwork Records which released it on November 12, 2021.

== Reception ==
Jonathan Broxton in his review for Movie Music UK found Part Three: 1666's score to be the weakest of the series, as "it contains by far the most challenging dissonance and intense horror writing, and is the least thematically dense" but also praised the composers' work, saying "the creativity behind the dissonance that Beltrami and Drubich show is certainly impressive, especially in the use of unusual percussion items." Maxance Vincent of CGMagazine called it as "a wonderful score from Marco Beltrami and Anna Drubich". Anthony McGlynn of The Digital Fix described it as a "hammed up score" and wrote "Sometimes cliches work, and the histrionic strings come in at just the right time for the final act." Michael Nordine of Variety and Lovia Gyarkye of The Hollywood Reporter found it to be "impressive" and "effective". Nicolás Delgadillo of DiscussingFilm found it to be a "stirring score".

== Track listing ==
=== Standard edition ===
Fear Street Part Three: 1666 (Music from the Netflix Trilogy) standard edition track listing
No.	Title	Music	Length
1.	"Reflection"	Marco Beltrami; Anna Drubich	1:15
2.	"Devil's Book"	Beltrami; Drubich	2:30
3.	"Full Moon Party"	Beltrami; Drubich	1:17
4.	"Maiden Rock"	Beltrami; Drubich	1:44
5.	"Pastor Miller"	Beltrami; Drubich	2:23
6.	"Bad Omens"	Beltrami; Drubich	1:18
7.	"Dalliance"	Beltrami; Drubich	1:28
8.	"The Pastor"	Beltrami; Drubich	2:28
9.	"Hysteria"	Beltrami; Drubich	2:00
10.	"Accusation"	Beltrami; Drubich	2:19
11.	"No Lamb"	Beltrami; Drubich	2:28
12.	"Book is Gone"	Beltrami; Drubich	1:41
13.	"Sarah Hides"	Beltrami; Drubich	1:55
14.	"Revelation"	Beltrami; Drubich	1:04
15.	"The Tunnels"	Beltrami; Drubich	1:55
16.	"Severed Hand"	Beltrami; Drubich	1:31
17.	"Sarah's Fate"	Beltrami; Marcus Trumpp	6:41
18.	"The Curse"	Beltrami; Trumpp	3:08
19.	"Goode Ending"	Beltrami; Trumpp	2:07
20.	"A New Day"	Beltrami; Trumpp	2:14
Total length:			43:26

=== Intrada expanded edition ===
An expanded edition that consisted of a complete score with previously unreleased material, was published by Intrada Records on August 2, 2024, as a 5-CD box set with other film scores in the trilogy. "Disc 4" and "Disc 5" would feature the complete score for Part Three: 1666. Albeit being split into two discs, the complete score would feature 41 tracks running for over one-and-a-half hours.

Fear Street Part Three: 1666 (Music from the Netflix Trilogy) expanded edition track listing
No.	Title	Length
1.	"Reflection"	1:20
2.	"Fruits of the Land"	1:10
3.	"Pastor's Daughter"	0:46
4.	"Cross Creek"	0:53
5.	"Sneaking Out"	2:17
6.	"Devil's Book"	2:34
7.	"Full Moon Party"	1:23
8.	"Maiden Rock"	1:50
9.	"Discovered"	1:11
10.	"Pastor Miller"	2:27
11.	"Strangeness"	2:36
12.	"Bad Omens"	1:22
13.	"Darkness Grows"	2:56
14.	"Dalliance"	1:33
15.	"The Pastor"	2:33
16.	"Hysteria"	2:06
17.	"Accusation"	2:23
18.	"Hannah Caught"	2:18
19.	"No Lamb"	2:32
20.	"Book Is Gone"	1:44
21.	"Mob Arrives"	1:18
22.	"Sarah Hides"	2:01
23.	"Revelation"	1:08
24.	"Confession"	1:54
25.	"The Tunnels"	1:59
26.	"Severed Hand"	1:37
27.	"Sarah Escapes"	1:52
28.	"Sarah Returns"	1:12
29.	"Sarah's Fate"	6:38
30.	"Goode Is Evil"	2:02
31.	"The Curse"	3:14
32.	"The Mall"	1:32
33.	"Try Not to Die"	0:37
34.	"Let's Do This"	3:11
35.	"Into the Trap"	4:23
36.	"Goode Arrives"	3:25
37.	"Down the Hatch"	2:10
38.	"We Lost Sam"	3:33
39.	"Ending Goode"	3:57
40.	"NC-21"	3:21
41.	"Sarah Returns" (alternate)	0:55
Total length:		89:53

== Additional music ==
Apart from the score, the film also had licensed songs that are heard in its second half. An official playlist compiled by Netflix is available to stream on music platforms, in lieu of a compilation soundtrack.

- Bone Thugs-n-Harmony – "Mo' Murda"
- The Offspring – "Come Out and Play"
- Jordyn DiNatale – "You Always Hurt the Ones You Love"
- Oasis – "Live Forever"
- Buddha An Da Bandit – "Bigger They Are"
- Pixies – "Gigantic"
- Pixies – "Mr. Grieves"
