= Annie Ellicott =

- Born: 9 March 1984 (age 42)
- Origin: Tulsa, Oklahoma, United States
- Genre: Jazz
- Occupations: Singer, composer, instrumentalist
- Instruments: keyboards, saxophone, ukulele, accordion, glockenspiel
- Years active: 2001–present
- Website: www.annieellicott.com

Annie Ellicott (born March 9, 1984) is an American jazz singer, composer and voice actor. She began performing from an early age in Tulsa, Oklahoma, making dozens of stage appearances as a child. After being discovered while in high school by veteran musician Buddy Bruce, she joined him and keyboardist Gayle Williamson as the singer for the jazz trio Soundz Good. She later formed her own group, and has collaborated with a number of local and national jazz musicians, including Brian Haas and Jeff Goldblum's The Mildred Snitzer Orchestra. Her 2016 avant-garde album Lonesome Goldmine featuring all original material won The Tulsa Voice's Best Local Album of the year.

In addition to performing on stage, since 2017, she has narrated audiobooks for Soundbooth Theater's productions, which specialize in fantasy series.

== Early life ==
Ellicott was born in Tulsa in 1984. Her father is musician Rod Ellicott, original bassist for the 1970s Bay Area jazz-rock band, Cold Blood. While in elementary school, Ellicott sang in the Tulsa Youth Opera chorus. She first performed jazz onstage at 15, for a high school concert, singing “Orange Colored Sky,” made famous by Nat King Cole.

Ellicott attended Tulsa's Central High School, during which she played saxophone. While still in school, she was discovered by guitarist Buddy Bruce when he presented a workshop for a jazz class. She took guitar lessons from Bruce, impressing him with her knowledge of jazz standards.

== Career ==
Ellicott's first paid gig was at age 16, singing at a Borders with guitarist and poet Jack Hannah, for $50 in store credit.

After graduation, she was asked by Buddy Bruce to join pianist Gayle Williamson as the new vocalist for their jazz ensemble. She later formed the Annie Ellicott Trio with her father Rod and guitarist Frank Brown, performing regular Wednesday shows at the now defunct Lola's On the Bowery, and at the Oklahoma Jazz Hall of Fame.

With the Brian Haas Trio (which included musicians from the Jacob Fred Jazz Odyssey), she put out her debut album in 2009, Ask Me Now, which showcased jazz classics. GTR News noted, "Ellicott’s timeless voice and Haas’ unique playing have produced a stupendous album."

In 2016, after a successful Indiegogo project organized by her manager, film producer Melanie Brooke Sweeney, Ellicott released her first album of original material, Lonesome Goldmine, on indie label Unknown Tone Records. The album was described by Tulsa People magazine as "incorporating elements of singer/songwriter folk, jazz fusion and ambient soundscapes." In support of the record's release, she performed shows that presented the album as an "immersive" multimedia experience, combining music videos, dance, performance and live music. Lonesome Goldmine went on to be named the Best Local Album of 2016 by alternative newspaper The Tulsa Voice.

Ellicott has performed with jazz pianist (and actor) Jeff Goldblum as part of his ensemble band, The Mildred Snitzer Orchestra at The Rockwell Table and Stage in Los Angeles; Feinstein’s At The Nikko in San Francisco; and at the Outside Lands Festival and Sketch Fest in 2016, 2017, and 2018. The SF Weekly called her appearance at Sketch Fest 2018 a "notable highlight, blessed with a breathy voice and not afraid to scat with the best of them."

== Discography ==
- Ask Me Now (Annie Ellicott and the Brian Haas Trio, 2009, SRO Productions)
- Lonesome Goldmine (2016, Unknown Tone Records)
