= Donald McLeary =

Scottish writer

- Born: 27 November 1973 (age 52); Scotland
- Occupation: Actor
- Years active: 1996–present
- Known for: Fags, Mags and Bags, Me Too

Donald Cameron McLeary (born 27 November 1973) is a Scottish actor, author and writer. He is best known for writing popular podcast Fags, Mags and Bags and starring as school teacher Mickey John in CBeebies show Me Too!.

== Career ==
McLeary grew up in Rutherglen, Scotland, and currently works and lives in the city of Glasgow.

From 2006 to 2008, McLeary played school teacher Mickey John in popular children's television programme Me Too!, which aired on CBeebies. He is titled as Donald Cameron in the cast list.

McLeary has starred and co-written Radio 4 comedy Fags, Mags and Bags since 2007, airing on BBC Radio 4 and BBC Sounds. He plays the part of Dave Legg.

Donald has also provided material for Scottish comedy Chewin' the Fat.

In 2018, he wrote an audiobook for Doctor Who, titled "Donald's River Song audio, Kings of Infinite Space".

In 2008, McLeary received a Writers Guild Award in for Radio Comedy of the Year.
