= Hard Labor Creek =

Hard Labor Creek may refer to:

- Hard Labor Creek (Georgia), stream in Morgan County, Georgia
- Hard Labor Creek Observatory, observatory in Rutledge, Georgia
- Hard Labor Creek Regional Reservoir, reservoir in Walton County, Georgia
- Hard Labor Creek State Park, Georgia state park

== See also ==
- Hard labor (disambiguation)
