= Hard labor (disambiguation) =

Hard labor or labour is another term for penal labour, punishment combining imprisonment with arduous manual labor.

Hard labor may also refer to:

- Manual labour, physically challenging work
- Hard Labor, a 1974 album by Three Dog Night
- Hard Labor (film), a 2011 Brazilian film
- Hard Labour (film), a 1973 British television film
- Hard Labor: The First African Americans, 1619, a 2004 book by Patricia and Fredrick McKissack
- Hard Labour, U.S. Virgin Islands, a settlement on the island of Saint Croix

== See also ==
- Hard Labor Creek (disambiguation), several places
- Treaty of Hard Labour, a 1768 treaty between the British and the Cherokee tribe in North America
