= Hard Labor Creek State Park =

Coordinates: 33.6640°N 83.6064°W

- U.S. National Register of Historic Places
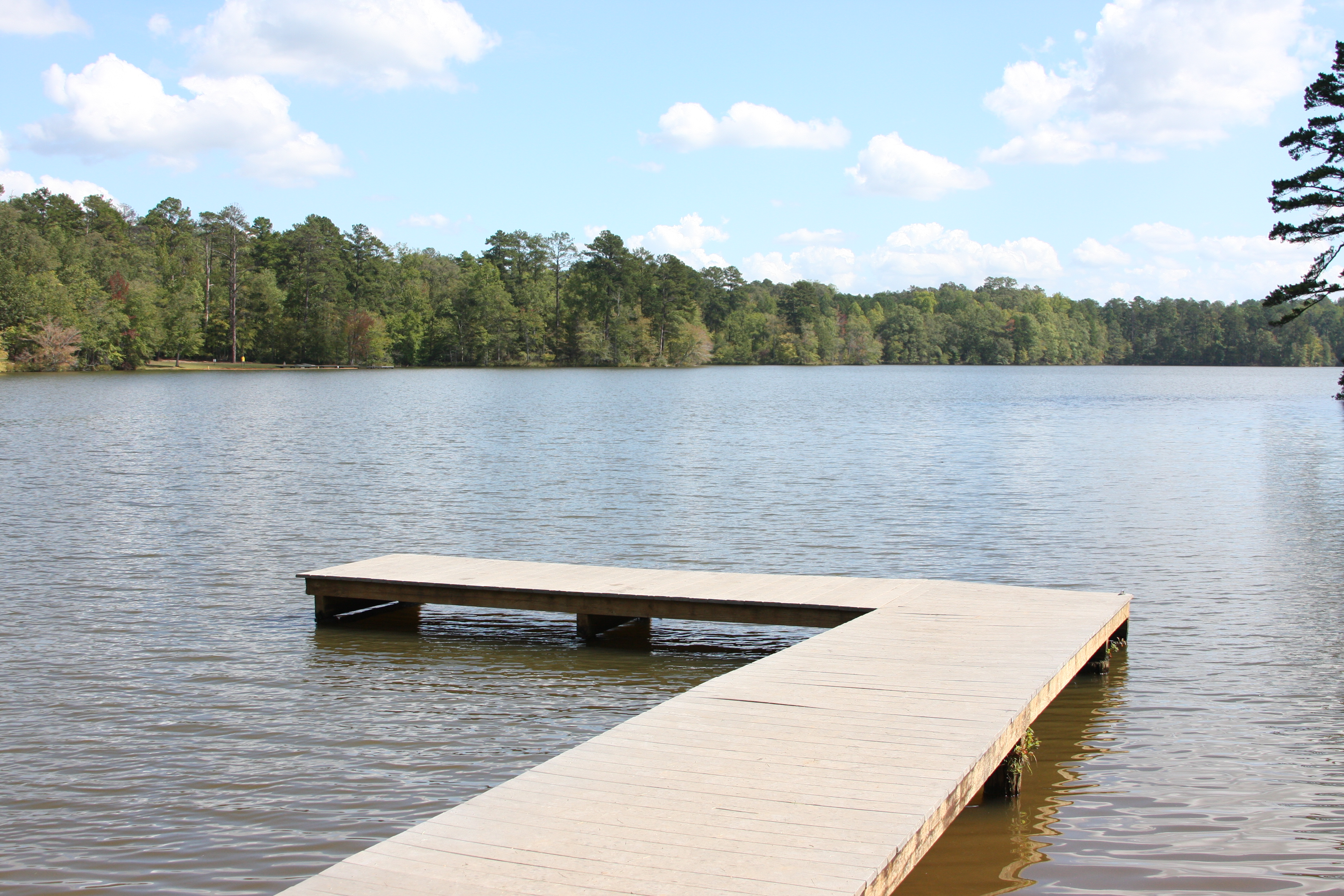
- Lake Rutledge, Hard Labor Creek State Park, October 2007

- Location within Georgia
- Nearest city: Rutledge, Georgia
- Area: 5,804 acres (2,349 ha)
- Built: 1934
- Architectural style: Rustic
- NRHP reference No.: 13000107
- Added to NRHP: March 27, 2013

Hard Labor Creek State Park is a 5,804 acre (23.49 km^{2}) Georgia state park located between Bostwick and Rutledge. The park is named after Hard Labor Creek, a small stream that cuts through the park. The creek's name comes either from enslaved people who once tilled the summer fields, or from Native Americans who found the area around the stream difficult to ford. The park plays host to an 18-hole public golf course, which offers a pro shop, driving range, rental cars, and senior citizen discounts. Rocky Creek provides many of the water hazards on the course including the 14th hole with its signature water wheel.

== General information ==
Hard Labor Creek State Park is a 24-hour passable by way of paved local surface roads non-gated state park. It is the home of two group camps, Camp Rutledge and Camp Daniel Morgan, both centered on the 275-acre (1.11 km^{2}) Lake Rutledge. A second lake, Lake Brantley, occupies the northwestern area of the park. This lake was named for a Brantley family killed by Native Americans in 1813. Both the camps and the lakes were built by the Civilian Conservation Corps in the 1930s.

Camp Daniel Morgan was the filming location of five movies, Summer of My German Soldier (1978), Little Darlings (1980), Poison Ivy (1985), Friday the 13th Part VI: Jason Lives (1986), and Fear Street Part 2: 1978 (2021). Kristy McNichol starred in the first two. Cynthia Nixon of Sex and the City fame, who played "Sunshine" in Little Darlings returned to the nearby town of Rutledge, Georgia in 2005 to film a part in the Emmy winning movie Warm Springs; a part in which she too was nominated for an Emmy award.

Hard Labor Creek State Park is the location of Hard Labor Creek Observatory; a facility of Georgia State University, Atlanta Georgia.

Camp Rutledge was leased for many years by the Atlanta Jewish Community Center during the 1950s up through 1962 as a site for its summer camp program serving Jewish youth from the Atlanta area as well as the southern United States. Its use by the AJCC was ended with the acquisition and development of Camp Barney Medintz near Cleveland, Georgia.

The Camp Rutledge facilities were featured on season 8 the show Ghost Hunters which aired in 2012, and in the 2022 film They/Them.

The park was temporarily utilized as an isolation and monitoring site for patients diagnosed with COVID-19 with no place to self-quarantine. Only two patients stayed at the site, before a new site was opened at the Georgia Public Safety Training Center outside of Forsyth on March 24.

The park was the special event site of the Parks on the Air, W4H "Wicked 4 Halloween," activation on October 31, 2021 by the Athens Radio Club.

== See also ==
- Hard Labor Creek Regional Reservoir
