= New Advent =

Digital library website of Catholic works

New Advent is a Catholic website that provides online versions of various works connected with the church.

== History ==
Front cover of 1913 Catholic Encyclopedia, Volume 1.

New Advent was founded by Kevin Knight, a Catholic layman. During the visit of Pope John Paul II for World Youth Day in 1993, Knight, then a 26-year-old resident of Denver, Colorado, was inspired to launch a project to publish the 1913 edition of the 1907–1912 Catholic Encyclopedia on the Internet. Knight founded the non-profit website New Advent to house the undertaking. Volunteers from the United States, Canada, France and Brazil helped in the transcription of the original material. The site went online in 1995 and transcription efforts for Catholic Encyclopedia finished in 1997.

== Contents ==
New Advent contains several public domain documents relevant to Catholics, including the Catholic Encyclopedia, the Summa Theologica, translated writings of the Church Fathers, a variety of papal encyclicals, and aggregated news relating to the Catholic Church.

The website provides navigation between related document through the frequent use of hyperlinks to other works hosted on its website.

== Reception ==
Writing in Reference Reviews, Georgia State University librarian Brian K. Koy labels the website as "highly recommended". Koy describes the website's content as straightforward and as being faithful to the text of the original works hosted on the website, but laments the relative lack of images and what he considers the overuse of hyperlinks.

== See also ==
- Christian Classics Ethereal Library
- Internet Sacred Text Archive
