= Poison Ivy (1985 film) =

- VHS cover
- Genre: Comedy; Romance
- Written by: Bennett Tramer
- Directed by: Larry Elikann
- Starring: Michael J. Fox; Nancy McKeon; Caren Kaye; Adam Baldwin; Robert Klein; Joe Wright; Cary Guffey
- Theme music composer: Miles Goodman
- Country of origin: United States
- Original language: English

Production
- Executive producer: Deborah Stoff
- Producer: Marvin Miller
- Production locations: Hard Labor Creek State Park - Fairplay Road, Rutledge, Georgia
- Cinematography: Robert C. Jessup
- Editor: Robert F. Shugrue
- Running time: 97 minutes
- Production company: NBC Productions

Original release
- Network: NBC
- Release: February 10, 1985

Poison Ivy is a 1985 American made-for-television romantic comedy film starring Michael J. Fox and Nancy McKeon, directed by Larry Elikann, and written by Bennett Tramer. The film premiered on NBC on February 10, 1985 and aired just months before Fox's feature film breakthrough Back to the Future and follow-up Teen Wolf.

== Plot ==
Michael J. Fox plays camp counselor Dennis Baxter, who works at a boys' summer camp called Camp Pinewood, located in Clifton, Maine. He falls in love with the new camp nurse Rhonda and spends the summer trying to convince her to leave her fiancé for him. Baxter's campers include the slick-talking Jerry Disbro, the sensitive writer Brian (who also has a crush on Rhonda), the baseball star Bobby, the overweight comedian Toby, and the shy Timmy Mezzy who is afraid of the water and wants to run away. Jerry ends up becoming the camp con man, operating such scams as a letter writing concession using Brian, turning the P.X. into "his own personal candy store", and making outlandish demands to help win Bobby his much-coveted spot on the Varsity baseball team by acting as his agent . "It's an honor to play for the Yankees, but Dave Winfield still cashes his checks", says Jerry. Along with Bobby, he hatches a plan to sneak over to the neighboring girls' camp to visit a girl he met on the train ride to camp. Timmy is always finding new and creative ways to escape, including busting out in a laundry truck and trying to sneak out by way of the girls' camp across the lake dressed in drag. The camp is run by 'Big Irv' Klopper and his wife Margo (much to her apparent displeasure). Baxter's arch-rival is fellow counselor Ike, who is much more serious about his job than Baxter. Ike is not at all popular among the campers and is seen as being something of a "Square", having been educated in a military school. Maintenance man Walter carries around a red-stained axe and is rumored to be a murderer.

As the summer progresses, Timmy makes friends with the other kids and stops trying to run away. Eventually he learns to swim and enters a swimming race in the annual Color War competition. Jerry, who is on the opposite team in the Color War, tells Timmy the story of "Tough Break Thompson", a camper who supposedly drowned after conquering his fear of water at the camp. Timmy panics during the swimming event when Jerry says "Timmy - tough break!" to him right before the race. Bobby then punches Jerry when he finds out what happened. Later, Jerry apologizes and the kids learn that their friendship is more important than the winner of the Color War, and the Color War is declared a tie. The climactic moment of the movie occurs when a camper shouts, "Timmy Mezzy's swimming the lake!" and the whole camp runs to watch Timmy swim across the lake, finally conquering his fear of water. Walter is also revealed to be a painter who uses his axe to create art. At the end of the summer, Baxter is offered the job of head counselor for the following year, having been chosen over Ike, much to Ike's chagrin. Rhonda and Baxter end up together.

== Cast ==
- Michael J. Fox as Dennis Baxter
- Nancy McKeon as Rhonda Malone
- Caren Kaye as Margo Klopper
- Adam Baldwin as Ike Dimick
- Robert Klein as Irwin 'Big Irv' Klopper
- Joe Wright as Jerry Disbro
- Cary Guffey as Timmy Mezzy

== Reception ==
Lawrence Van Gelder of The New York Times called Poison Ivy "two hours of tedium".
