= The Signal (college newspaper) =

Georgia State University's student-run newspaper

- Cover of the March 29, 2022, issue
- Type: Weekly student newspaper
- Format: Tabloid
- Owner: Georgia State University
- Publisher: Georgia State Student Publications
- Editor: Adam Duffy
- Founded: 1933
- Headquarters: Atlanta, Georgia, United States
- Circulation: 5,000 (spring and fall)
- Website: georgiastatesignal.com

The Signal is the official student newspaper of Georgia State University in Atlanta, Georgia. As of 2018, The Signal has a weekly circulation of about 5,000 issues distributed to all Georgia State campuses, including Alpharetta, Atlanta, Decatur, Dunwoody, Newton and a handful of locations in the surrounding area. The paper publishes on Tuesdays during Spring and Fall semesters (in addition to a summer magazine for incoming students). It primarily covers news, events and issues specific to the Georgia State community and covers stories relating to the city of Atlanta with interest to its readers.

== History ==
Georgia State's student newspaper evolved with each incarnation of the school. The school's first student newspaper, The Technite, was named in homage to the Georgia Institute of Technology's own student paper, The Technique, when the school was founded as the Georgia School of Technology's Evening School of Commerce.

In 1933, when the university became the Atlanta Extension Center of the University System of Georgia, the day division and night division of the school each produced their own separate newspaper (named The Junior Collegiate and the Evening Signal, respectively). The publications would twice coordinate with one another, initially as the Collegiate-Signal on April 21, 1941, and again as the University Signal on September 22, 1941. When the two publications merged permanently in 1943, the formal name of the publication became The Signal. Since that time, a number of mastheads have been used, including The University Signal, The Georgia State Signal, the Georgia State College Signal, and the Georgia State University Signal.

During his time at Georgia State, D.W. Pine, design director of Time magazine was editor-in-chief of The Signal.

== Present-day publication ==
The March 13, 2012 front page of The Signal

The print edition of The Signal is published every Tuesday during the Fall and Spring semesters, with the exceptions of Finals Week, Spring break and Thanksgiving break. It also prints a special summer magazine for incoming freshman and transfer students, known as The Urbanite (named after the arts & entertainment magazine once published by The Signal in the 1990s and 2000s). The website is updated daily throughout the year.

The newspaper is operated by a staff of approximately 100 students, subdivided into editorial, production, marketing and advertising departments. Although Georgia State offers degrees in journalism, The Signal allows students from any major within the university to contribute. It is funded primarily by print and digital advertising, while its printing costs are paid for by student fees. It runs its website independent from the school and the current URL (georgiastatesignal.com) was launched in 2012 after over a decade of the paper publishing through the College Publisher system (at gsusignal.com).

== Sections ==
The print edition of The Signal is generally between 16 and 20 pages long and organized into four sections:

- Arts and Living includes human interest stories, reviews of music, movies, performance arts, and video games, cartoons, a crossword puzzle, sudoku puzzles, and campus events.
- News includes news, investigative stories and Georgia State-specific crime reports.
- Opinions includes editorials, an editorial cartoon, op-eds, and letters to the editor, as well as a regular Student Vox feature.
- Sports includes features, team profiles, in-depth analysis and summaries of recent Georgia State sports games.

== Awards ==
The Signal has won numerous awards, including;

- The 2012, 2013, 2014, and 2017 General Excellence awards in "Division 4A" from the Georgia College Press Association
- The "Best College Newspaper" award in the Southeast Journalism Conference's 2013, 2016, 2017, 2020 and 2021 "Best of the South" contests
- Best in Show in its division at the National College Media Convention on November 4, 2012

== Notable alumni ==
- John C. Knapp, president of Washington & Jefferson College
- D.W. Pine, creative director for Time magazine
