= Decatur Street (Atlanta) =

Street in Atlanta, Georgia, US

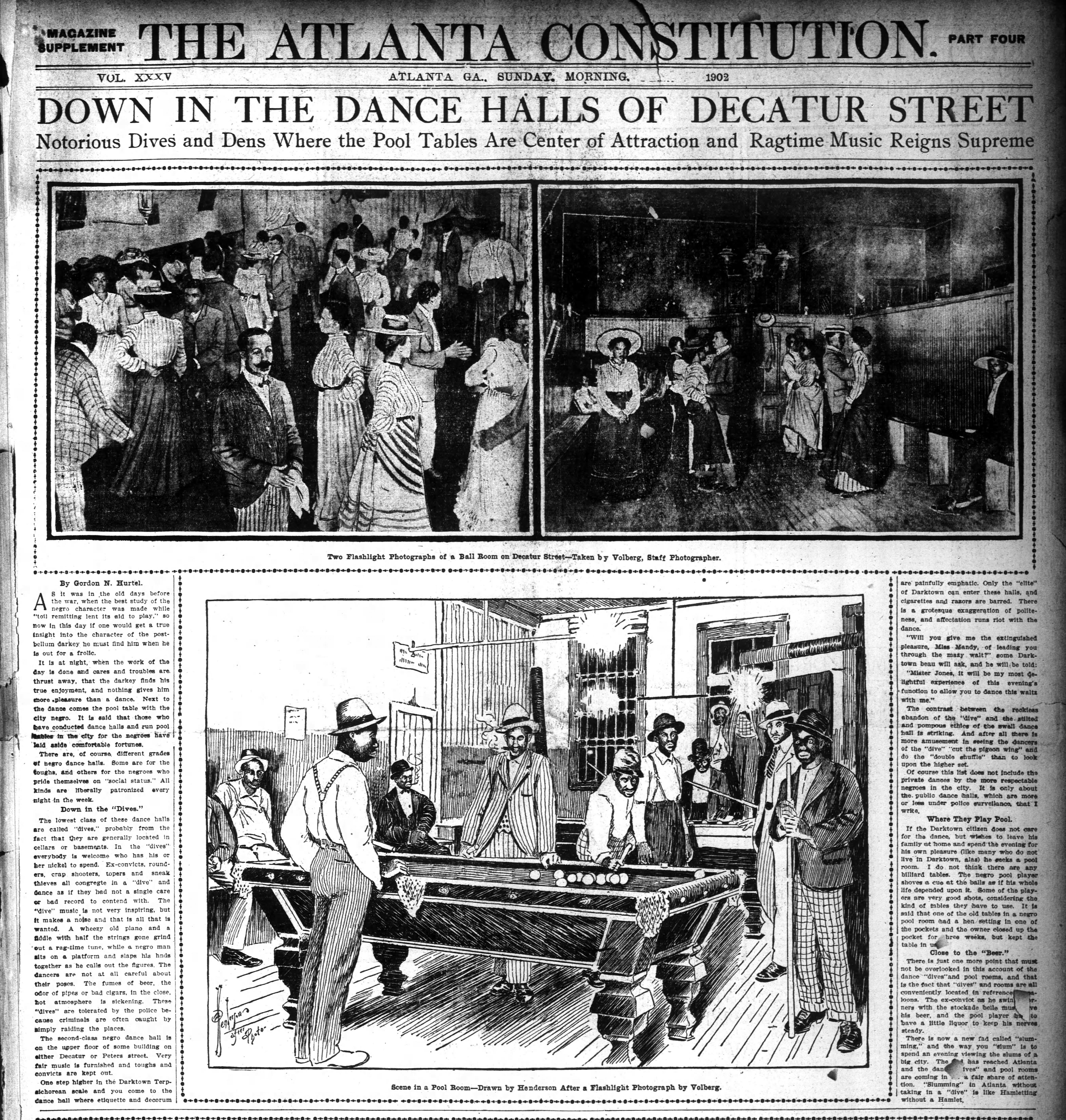
Atlanta Constitution 1902 exposé on black nightlife in Decatur Street

Decatur Street is one of the original 7 streets of Atlanta, Georgia; it was also a famous (and infamous) entertainment area from the 1850s through the early 20th century.

== History ==
In 1854 the first theater in the city, the Athenaeum, opened on Decatur near Peachtree Street.

In the early 20th century, Decatur Street was an African American entertainment district. In 1906 it was a focal point of the Atlanta Race Riot; allegations that the street's dive bars, frequented by blacks, were showing nude pictures of white women and "troublesome Negro vagrants" were hanging around there were among the allegations whipping up anti-black sentiment among poor whites. After the riot, the Atlanta Constitution regularly ran stories documenting city efforts to clean up the street's dance halls, saloons, and dives; ragtime music; whiskey and drug peddling.

In 1909 the city nearly changed the name of the street to East Main Street in an effort to clean up the street's reputation. At the start of the 1920s it was commemorated in the Clarence Williams song "Decatur Street Blues."

Decatur Street in downtown Atlanta cuts across the campus of Georgia State University, while farther east it was part of a 1940s urban-renewal area that became Grady Homes, demolished in 2005 and replaced by the Ashley Auburn Pointe mixed-income community, now considered part of the Sweet Auburn neighborhood as it is officially defined. Its span across the Georgia State University campus includes a skyway that connects the two sides of its LCC-collated library, with the southern side housing only one class: Class Q -- Science, and the northern side houses all the others.

== Gallery ==
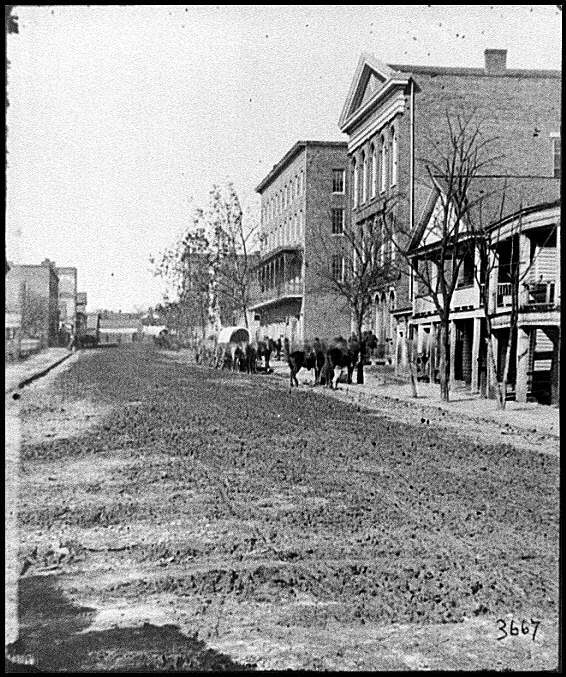
Decatur Street, late 1864

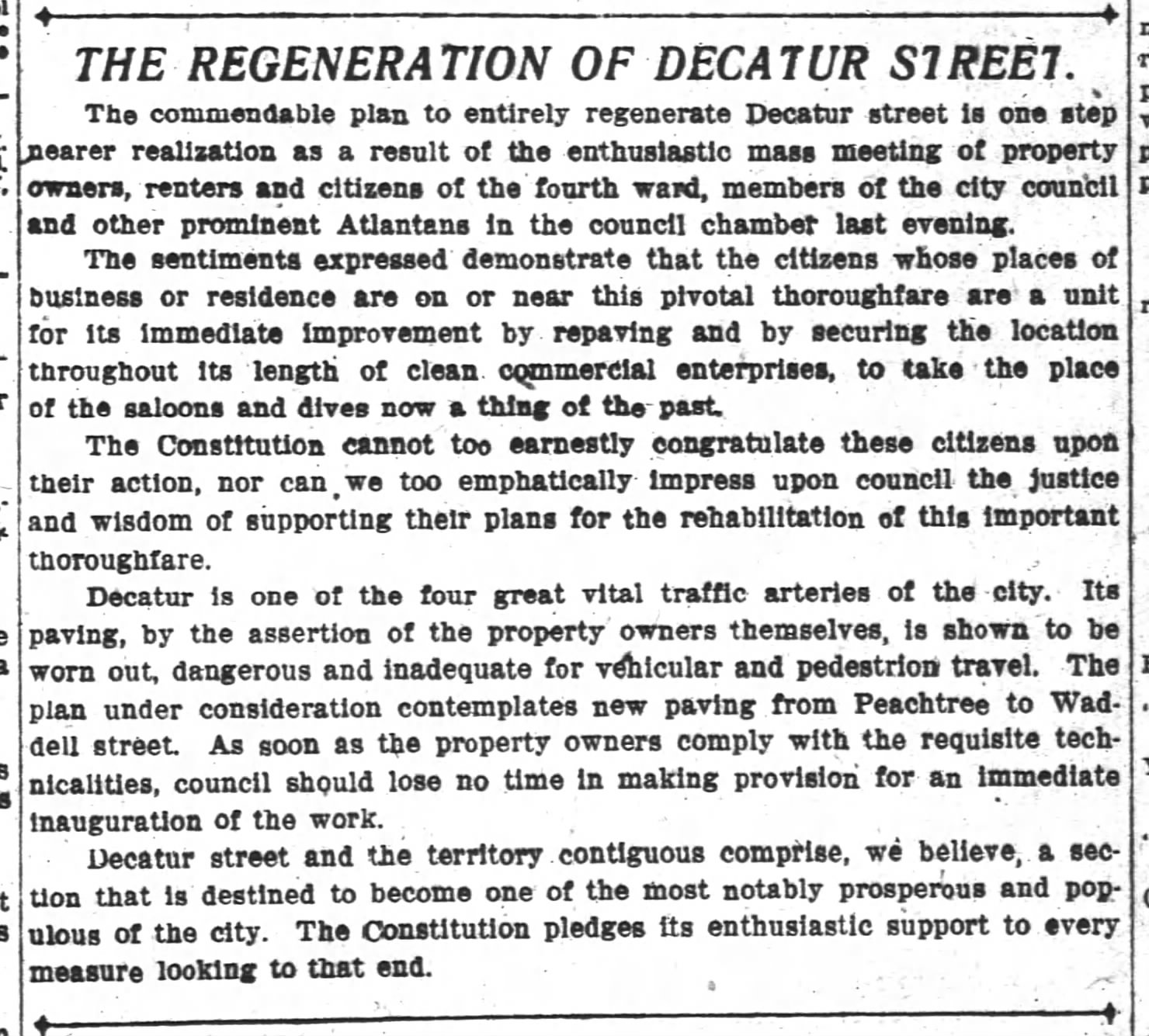
Atlanta Constitution 1908 article about a proposal to "regenerate" Decatur Street

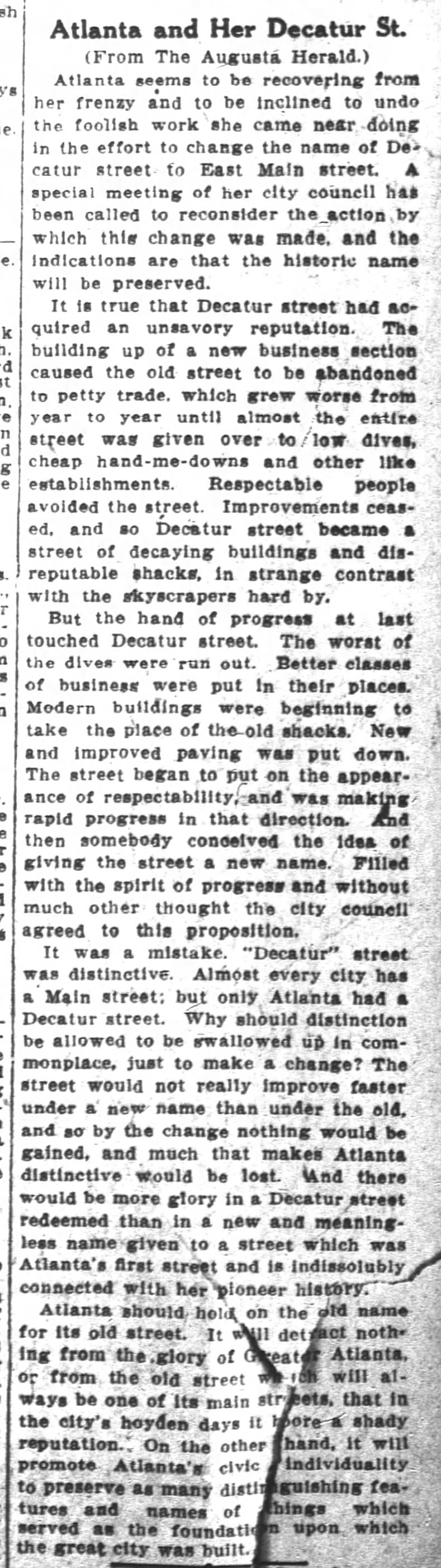
Atlanta Constitution 1909 article about Decatur Street

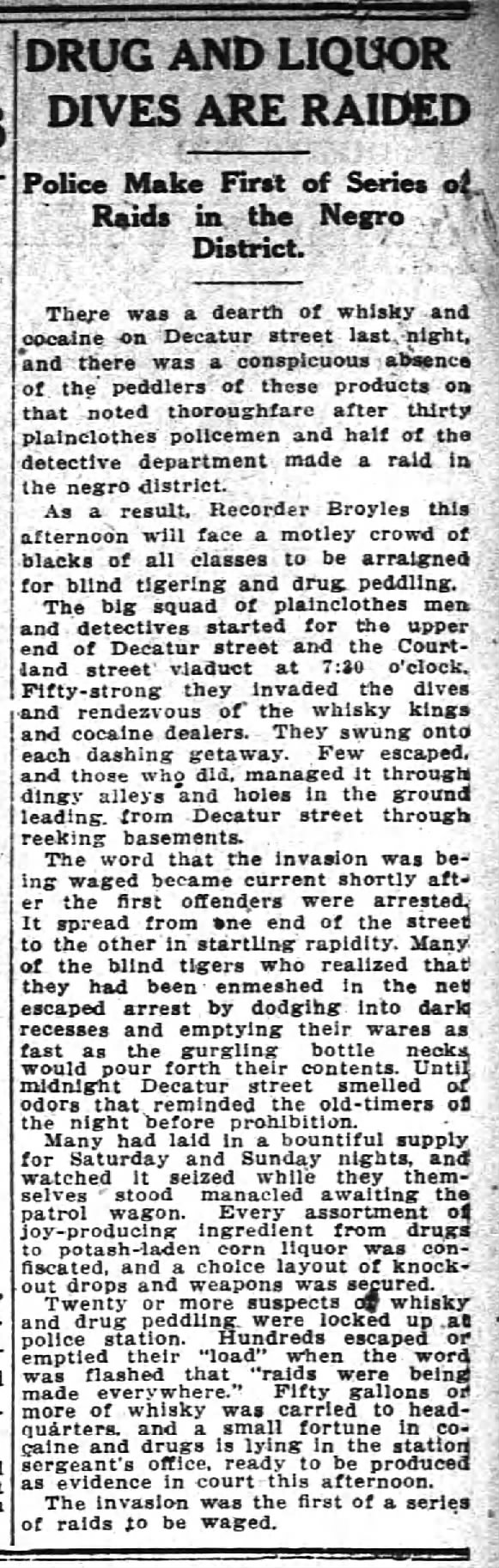
Atlanta Constitution 1912 article about Decatur Street
