= Christian Classics Ethereal Library =

Digital library and website

- Website type: Digital library
- Owner: Calvin College
- Creator: Harry Plantinga
- Website: www.ccel.org
- Commercial: No (see text)
- Registration: None
- Launched: 1993; 33 years ago

The Christian Classics Ethereal Library (CCEL) is a digital library that provides free electronic copies of Christian scripture and literature texts. CCEL is available in 120 countries.

== Description ==
CCEL is a volunteer-based project founded and directed by Harry Plantinga, a professor of computer science at Calvin College. It was initiated at Wheaton College in 1993 and is currently supported by Calvin University. It includes Hymnary.org.

The stated purpose of the CCEL is "To build up Christ's church by making available classic Christian books and promoting their use." The documents in the library express a variety of theological views, sometimes conflicting with those of Calvin University.

The site offers texts in six languages, including English, Latin and Russian.

The site stores texts in Theological Markup Language (ThML) format. It automatically converts them into other formats such as HTML or Portable Document Format (PDF). Although they use mainly Public Domain texts, they claim copyright on all their formatting. Users must log into their website to download all formatted versions of the text.

The site also offers audio files including audiobooks and music.

CCEL is funded by online advertisements, sales of CD-ROMs (available from 1997 to 2019), sales of some books not freely downloadable, and individual gifts. Calvin University has also provided them with space, network access, and significant financial support.

As of 2006, the library was recording about 200,000 page views per day and providing about 2 TB of information (equivalent to over a million books) in a month.

According to a 2002 reviewer, while the site is "intended to be a basic online theological library," it nonetheless contains "a treasure of primary sources for anyone teaching Western Civilization or more specialized courses in medieval or Reformation history." The reviewer also noted that the ability to search the music "for specific note patterns" was valuable to musicologists.

As of 2005, the primary users of the library fell into three main categories. These are university professors and their students using texts from the library as required reading without running up the students' bill for textbooks, people preparing sermons and Bible studies, and those reading for individual edification.

== See also ==
- Internet Sacred Text Archive
- List of digital library projects
- New Advent
- Wikisource
