= Hard Labor Creek Regional Reservoir =

Artificial reservoir in Georgia, US

- Location within Georgia Location within the United States
- Location: Georgia
- Coordinates: 33°40′56″N 83°38′03″W
- Type: Reservoir Dam/Reservoir Construction: March–April 2015 Reservoir Fills: 2015 - 2018 Reservoir Full Pool: 2018
- Primary inflows: On Hard Labor Creek, with pump diversion from the Apalachee River; Reedy Creek
- Basin countries: Eastern Continental Divide watershed (Upper Oconee), United States
- Surface area: 1,370 acres (5.5 km^{2})
- Average depth: 82 feet (25 m) at dam
- Surface elevation: 700 ft (213.4 m) summer 700 ft (213.4 m) winter
- Settlements: Social Circle, Georgia; Rutledge, Georgia

Hard Labor Creek Regional Reservoir is a 1,370-acre (550 ha) artificial reservoir in a region on the south-east side of unincorporated Walton County, Georgia, United States, near both Social Circle and Rutledge, about 40 miles (64 km) east of Atlanta. It features a Category I earthen dam constructed primarily for municipal water supply, with a secondary consideration of recreation, on Hard Labor Creek. The dam is approximately 1,950 feet (590 m) long, 460 feet (140 m) wide, and 94 feet (29 m) high, with a spillway crest elevation of 700 feet (210 m) above mean sea level (MSL).

First proposed in 1997, built in response to the growing controversy over the Tri-state water dispute, the State of Georgia with its 52 watershed regions drains primarily into either the Gulf of Mexico, or the Atlantic, with the reservoir existing in the Upper Oconee River watershed, which ultimately drains into the latter.

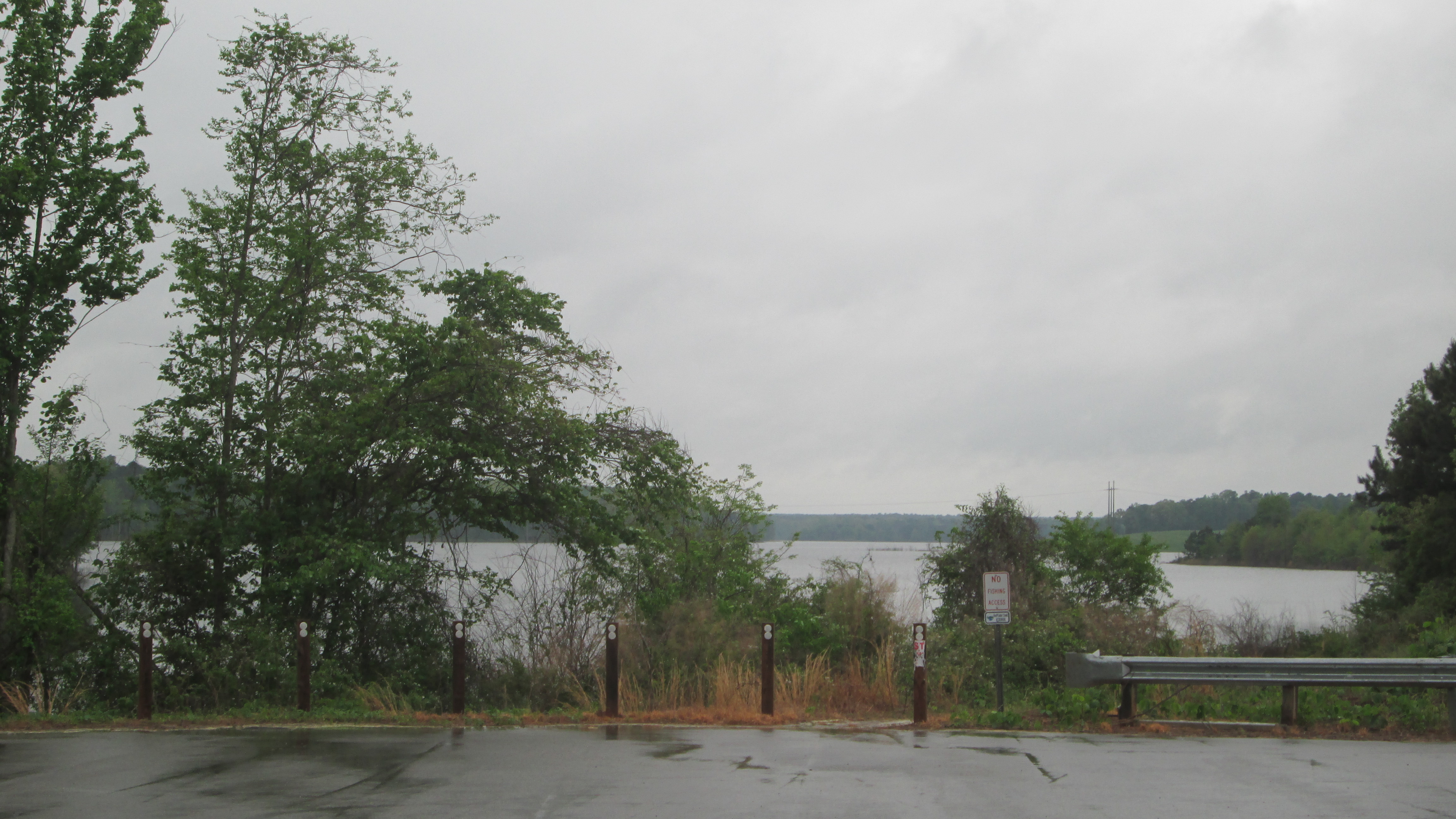
a view of Hard Labor Creek Regional Reservoir, Walton County, in the State of Georgia, U.S., from a nearby residential cul-de-sac

== Recreation ==
The shores of the reservoir are private property. There is day parking, a boat ramp facility and modern rest room houses in operation. The reservoir and the parking area are gated and closed at night by a chain link barrier. Overnight occupancy or use of the lake is prohibited at any time other than the designated dawn-to-dusk boating and fishing hours.
