= Internet Sacred Text Archive =

Website dedicated to the preservation of electronic public domain texts

- Website type: Digital library
- Owner: John Bruno Hare
- Creator: John Bruno Hare
- Website: www.sacred-texts.com
- Commercial: No
- Registration: None
- Launched: March 9, 1999

The Internet Sacred Text Archive (ISTA) is a Santa Cruz, California-based website dedicated to the preservation of electronic public domain religious texts.

== History ==
The website was first opened to the public on March 9, 1999, by John Bruno Hare (1955–2010), in Santa Cruz, California. Hare started building the website from his home in the late 1990s, as "an intellectual challenge". At the time, he was working as a software engineer with a dot-com company, and started by scanning over 1,000 public domain books on religion, folklore and mythology. The reason for its founding was the promotion of religious tolerance through knowledge. It also seeks to remedy the under-representation of traditional religion, folklore, and spirituality.

Its texts are organized into 77 different categories. The maintenance costs for the website—which as of 2006 received anywhere from five hundred thousand to two million visits a day—are primarily funded by sales of the website on DVD-ROM, CD-ROM, and USB flash drives. The site also gets money from advertising from Amazon and Google as well as monetary donations, although it typically receives less than $100 a year in donations.

== Contents ==
The Internet Sacred Text Archive lists three general links, World Religions, Traditions, and Mysteries. The first leads to the texts of the Near Eastern religions (Zoroastrianism, Judaism, Christianity and Islam); to Eastern religions Hinduism, Buddhism, Jainism, Sikhism, Confucianism, Taoism and Shinto; and to some modern developments Baháʼí and Mormonism, as well as secondary sources describing them. It also contains a timeline of the major world religions.

The second leads to Indigenous religions, including those of Africa, North, Central and South America and Polynesia, texts on Shamanism,and transcriptions of oral myths. It also contains the first 1000 lines of Chromosome One of the Human Genome, Paleolithic cave paintings, folklore, fairy tales, historical legends, texts on women in religion, texts on sexuality in religion, as well as pagan and neo-pagan texts.

The third leads to miscellaneous works including Nostradamus's writings, descriptions of Atlantis, texts on conspiracies and secret societies, and grimoires.

The main page has a site map that is organized alphabetically.

== See also ==
- Christian Classics Ethereal Library
- List of digital library projects
- New Advent
- Wikisource
