= Byrdine F. Lewis College of Nursing and Health Professions =

Division of Georgia State University

Coordinates: 33.752103°N 84.385283°W

The Byrdine F. Lewis College of Nursing and Health Professions contains the nursing school and school of allied health professions at Georgia State University.

== History ==
The school is named after Byrdine F. Lewis, the mother of Kenneth Lewis, a former CEO of Bank of America and an alumnus of Georgia State. Ken's mother was a nurse, and he donated $2.5 million as an endowment in her honor. The school was originally part of the College of Health and Human Sciences, but was restructured to its current configuration. The School of Nursing's offices are located in the Urban Life Building, along with the College of Law. On August 1, 2017, the institute was renamed from Byrdine F. Lewis School of Nursing and Health Professions to Byrdine F. Lewis College of Nursing and Health Professions
