= Georgia State University =

Public university in Atlanta, Georgia, US

- Former name: List: Evening School of Commerce of Georgia Institute of Technology (1913–1947) Atlanta Division of the University of Georgia (1947–1955) Georgia State College of Business Administration (1955–1961) Georgia State College (1961–1969) DeKalb College (1964–1972) DeKalb Community College (1972–1997) Georgia Perimeter College (1997–2016)
- Motto: Veritas valet et vincet (Latin)
- Motto in English: "Truth shall overcome"
- Type: Public research university
- Established: 1913; 113 years ago
- Parent institution: University System of Georgia
- Accreditation: SACS
- Academic affiliations: GCU; ORAU; PIT-UN; UIA; USU; Space-grant
- Endowment: $256.5 million (2024)
- President: M. Brian Blake
- Provost: Nicolle Parsons-Pollard
- Academic staff: 1,444 (fall 2023)
- Administrative staff: 4,852 (full-time fall 2023)
- Students: 53,144 (fall 2025)
- Undergraduates: 45,065 (fall 2025)
- Postgraduates: 6,053 (fall 2025)
- Doctoral students: 2,026 (fall 2025)
- Location: Atlanta, Georgia, United States; 33°45′13.3″N 84°23′09.5″W
- Campus: 109.87 acres (0.445 km^{2}) (main campus); 440.06 acres (1.781 km^{2}) (all instructional sites); 771.41 acres (3.122 km^{2}) (total); Large city
- Radio station: WRAS
- Newspaper: The Signal
- Colors: Blue and white
- Nickname: Panthers
- Sporting affiliations: NCAA Division I FBS – Sun Belt
- Mascot: Pounce the Blue Panther
- Other campuses: Alpharetta; Clarkston; Decatur; Dunwoody; Newton
- Website: gsu.edu

Georgia State University (Georgia State, State, or GSU) is a public research university in Atlanta, Georgia, United States. Founded in 1913, it is one of the University System of Georgia's four research universities. It is also the largest in-person institution of higher education by enrollment based in Georgia with a student enrollment of 53,144, including 45,065 undergraduate and 8,079 graduate students across all of their campuses.

Georgia State is classified among "R1: Doctoral Universities – Very high research spending and doctorate production". The university is the most comprehensive public institution in Georgia, offering more than 250-degree programs in over 100 fields of study spread across 10 academic colleges and schools. Georgia State has two libraries: University Library, which is split between Library North and Library South on the main campus and also divided among the Perimeter College campuses, and Law Library, which is located on the main campus. Together, both libraries contain over 13 million holdings and serve as federal document depositories. Georgia State has a $3.2 billion economic impact in Georgia.

Georgia State University's intercollegiate athletics teams, the Georgia State Panthers, compete in NCAA Division I's Sun Belt Conference. Georgia State is a founding member of the Sun Belt Conference.

== History ==
Initially intended as a night school, Georgia State University was established in 1913 as the Georgia School of Technology's Evening School of Commerce. A reorganization of the University System of Georgia in the 1930s led to the school becoming the Atlanta Extension Center of the University System of Georgia and allowed night students to earn degrees from several colleges in the University System. During this time, the school was divided into two divisions: Georgia Evening College and Atlanta Junior College. In September 1947, the school became affiliated with the University of Georgia and was named the Atlanta Division of the University of Georgia.

For its first four decades, the school was treated as an offsite department of its parent institution, Georgia Tech, until 1947, and UGA after 1947. Accordingly, its chief executive was called a director. However, in 1955, the Board of Regents made it an autonomous four-year college under the name Georgia State College of Business Administration. Walter Sparks, who had served as director since 1927, became the newly autonomous institution's first president. In 1961, other programs at the school had grown large enough that the name was shortened to Georgia State College. It became Georgia State University in 1969.

The first African-American student became enrolled at Georgia State in 1962, a year after the integration of the University of Georgia and Georgia Tech. Annette Lucille Hall was a Lithonia social studies teacher who enrolled in the course of the Institute on Americanism and Communism, a course required for all Georgia social studies teachers.

The Peachtree Road Race was founded in 1970 by Georgia State cross-country coach and dean of men Tim Singleton, heading it in its first six years before turning it over to the Atlanta Track Club.

In 1995, the Georgia Board of Regents accorded Georgia State "research university" status, joining the University of Georgia, the Georgia Institute of Technology, and Augusta University.

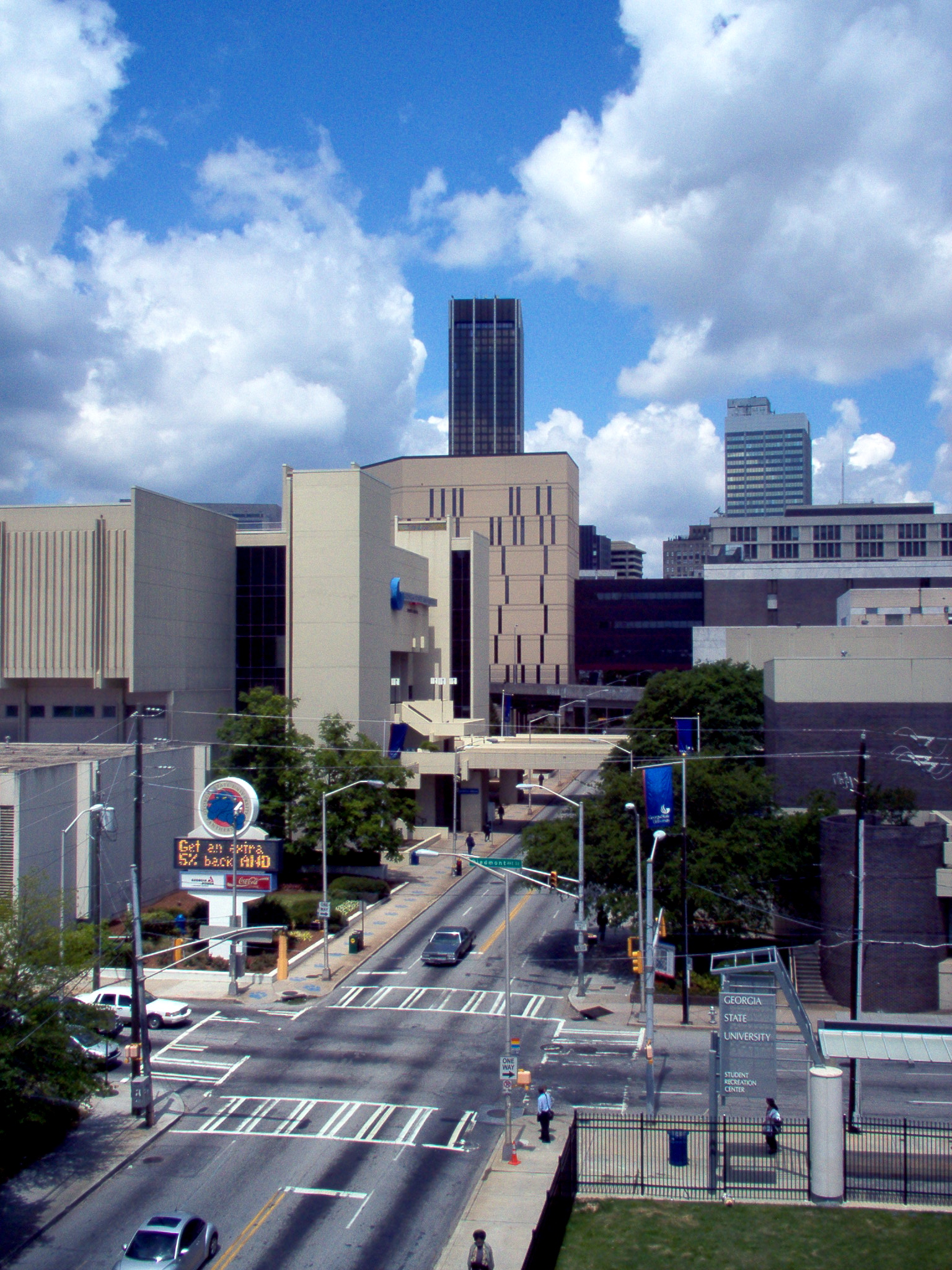
View of (from L-R) the Sports Arena and Library South on Decatur Street

=== Expansion periods ===
==== 1913–1975 ====
Over its 100-plus-year history, Georgia State's growth has required the acquisition and construction of more space to suit its needs. During the late 1960s and early 1970s, numerous buildings were constructed as part of a major urban renewal project, such as the Pullen Library in 1966, Classroom South in 1968, the expansion of the Pullen Library in 1968, the Arts and Humanities Building in 1970, the 10-story General Classroom Building in 1971 (now called Langdale Hall), the Sports Arena in 1973, and the 12-story Urban Life Building in 1974. In addition, a raised platform and walkway system was constructed to connect these buildings over Decatur Street and various parking structures.

==== 1980–1989 ====
In the 1980s, another round of expansion took place with the acquisition of the former Atlanta Municipal Auditorium in 1979, which was subsequently converted into Alumni Hall in 1982 and then to Dahlberg Hall in 2010, and currently houses Georgia State's administrative offices. That same year, the College of Law was founded in the Urban Life Building, and the Title Building on Decatur Street was acquired and converted into the College of Education's headquarters and classroom space. In 1988, the nine-story Library South was constructed on the south side of Decatur Street, which was connected to the Pullen Library via a three-story high foot bridge (officially referred to as a "link") and effectively doubled the library's space.

==== 1990–2004 ====
Georgia State continued this growth into the 1990s, with the expansion of Alumni Hall in 1991, the opening of the Natural Science Center in 1992, and the acquisition of the former C&S Bank Building on Marietta Street in 1993, which is now the home of the Robinson College of Business. Georgia State's first move into the Fairlie-Poplar district was the acquisition and renovation of the Standard Building, the Haas-Howell Building, and the Rialto Theater in 1996. The Standard and Haas-Howell buildings house classrooms, offices, and practice spaces for the School of Music, and the Rialto is home to Georgia State's Jazz Studies program and an 833-seat theater. In 1998, the Student Center was expanded toward Gilmer Street and provided a new 400-seat auditorium and space for exhibitions and offices for student clubs. A new Student Recreation Center opened on the corner of Piedmont Avenue and Gilmer Street in 2001. In 2002, the five-story Helen M. Aderhold Learning Center opened on Luckie Street amid controversy over the demolition of historical buildings on its block. Most recently, in 2004, the Andrew Young School of Policy Studies was moved to the former Wachovia Bank Building at Five Points.

==== 2005–2015 ====
After the release of the 2006 master plan update, a host of new building activities occurred on campus. A $20 million refurbishment to the Pullen Library complex was completed during the 2006–07 school year. Multiple new units of on-campus housing were built, including the 2,000 bed University Commons in 2007, a new dormitory named Freshman Hall (later renamed Patton Hall) in 2009 and a conversion of a former Wyndham Garden Hotel and a Baymont Inn & Suites into a new 1,100 occupancy dormitory named Piedmont North. New Greek housing was built in 2010 along Edgewood Avenue. The Citizens Trust Building on Piedmont Avenue was purchased by the university to make room for offices and student services in 2007. The Parker H. Petit Science Center was completed in 2010, opening up state-of-the-art science laboratories and teaching space. In 2013, Georgia State started operating from the original home of the Trust Company of Georgia and the SunTrust Bank, the 25 Park Place Building, a 26-floor skyscraper located adjacent to Woodruff Park in the heart of downtown Atlanta. The building currently houses many academic units of the College of Arts and Sciences, including the Dean's Office, the University Advisement Center, and facilities of the School of Public Health. In May 2015, the College of Law was moved to its new building at 89 Park Place after the land was donated to the university.

==== 2016–present ====
The newest incarnation of the university's strategic plan gives an outline of the university's growth from 2011 until 2016 and a brief overview that will be amended for up to 2021. In 2016, an extension to the Petit Science Center was completed. Plans exist for the building of graduate student housing behind the center.

On May 31, 2012, the athletics department released a new facilities master plan. The plan includes upgrades and renovations to the GSU Sports Arena including new outdoor sand volleyball courts (which have since been completed) as well as plans to build new baseball, softball, and soccer stadiums. These would replace the current stadiums in Panthersville. In May 2014, the university announced its intentions to pursue the 77-acre (312,000 m^{2}) Turner Field site once the Atlanta Braves Major League Baseball club moves into Truist Park in 2017. The university intends to retrofit Turner Field into a 30,000-seat open-air football stadium and build a new baseball field on the site of the former Atlanta–Fulton County Stadium, incorporating the wall where Hank Aaron hit his record-breaking 715th home run. Additional retail and student housing development is also planned for the parking areas surrounding Turner Field.

On December 21, 2015, the Atlanta Fulton County Recreation Authority announced that Georgia State's bid to redevelop Turner Field had been accepted. On August 18, 2016, Georgia State and the Atlanta-Fulton County Recreation Authority reached a tentative purchase agreement for Turner Field, and the purchase and redevelopment plan was approved by the Board of Regents on November 9, 2016. On January 5, 2017, Georgia State's acquisition of Turner Field, since renamed Georgia State Stadium, was officially closed, with the stadium conversion project beginning in February 2017. Georgia State Stadium hosted its first game on August 31, 2017.

In June 2021, M. Brian Blake became Georgia State University's first African-American and person of color president.

The Robert W. Woodruff Foundation donated $80 million to the university, which they announced they would use for renovations.

===== Consolidation with Georgia Perimeter College =====
On January 5, 2015, news broke that Georgia State and Georgia Perimeter College would merge. Over a year later, the Board of Regents of the University System of Georgia approved the merger of Georgia State University and Georgia Perimeter College, a 2-year college with five campuses. The board also announced that the president of Georgia State would remain the president of the combined university, which retained the name Georgia State University. The merger created the largest university in the state of Georgia at about 52,000 students. Since Georgia State's consolidation with Georgia Perimeter College in 2016, graduation rates at Perimeter College have almost tripled.

== Campus ==
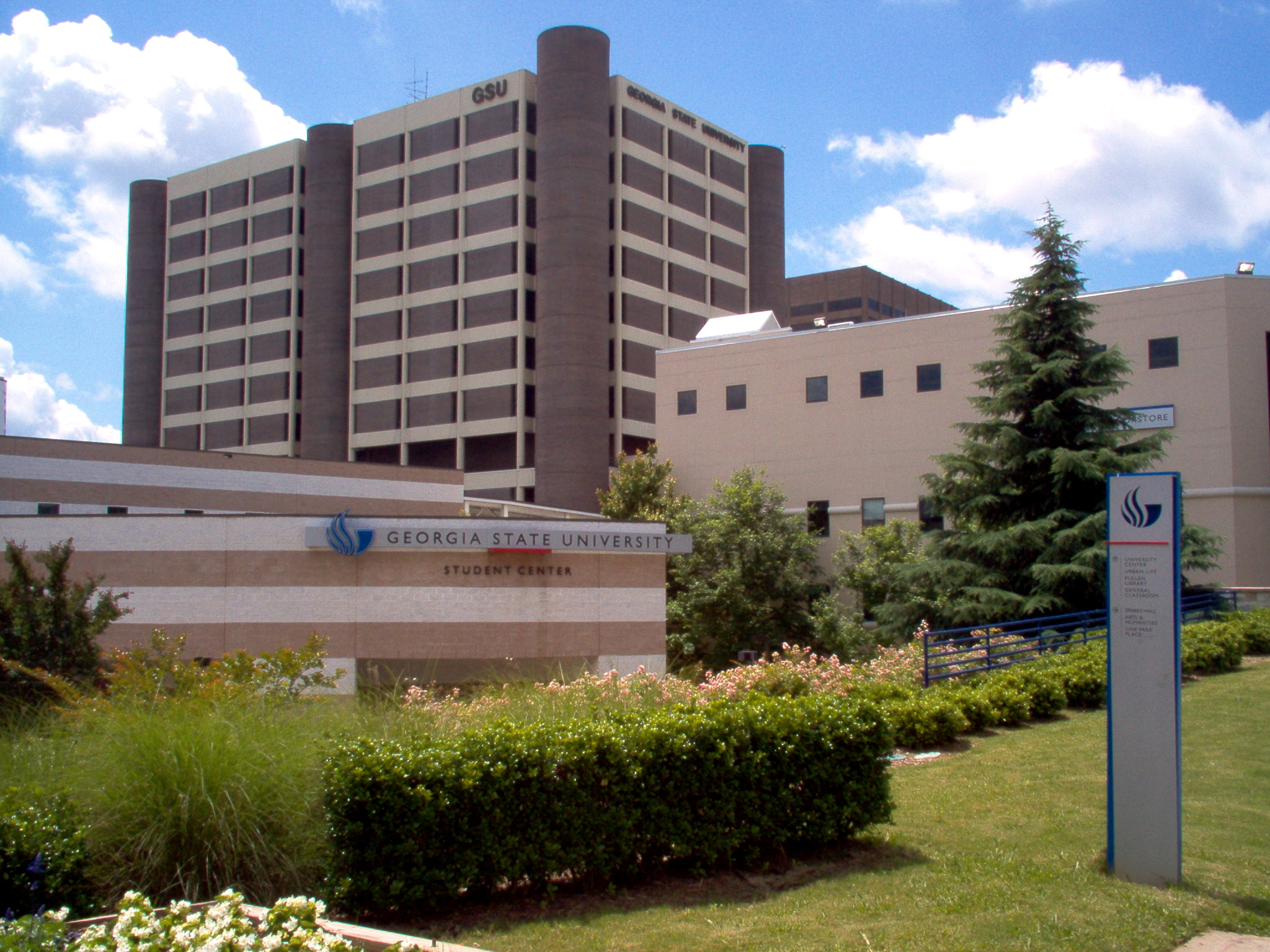
View of (from L-R) the Student Center, Urban Life Building, and University Center

From Georgia State's days as a single-building night school into the university it is today, Georgia State has built itself into the heart of urban Downtown Atlanta. Whereas the school's nickname—dating from the early 1960s—of "the Concrete Campus" was once a source of mild embarrassment, the name has been embraced by the university community. The university embraced the slogan, "a part of the city, not apart from the city" as its growth into Downtown Atlanta increased. This has led to the widening of sidewalks around the campus and a focus on Decatur Street as becoming the "Main Street" of the campus.

=== 25 Park Place ===
25 Park Place is a mixed-use classroom and office building that houses several departments at Georgia State University. The building was previously the Trust Company of Georgia Building, and before Georgia State University acquiring the building was the SunTrust Bank Building. The Georgia State University Foundation acquired the building in 2006 for $52 million.

=== Sparks Hall ===
Sparks Hall was the first building designed and built specifically for the school. It was designed by the Atlanta architectural firm of Cooper, Barrett, Skinner, Woodbury, and Cooper. Construction took place between 1952 and 1955 and cost about $2 million. The first classes were held in the building on April 21, 1955. On June 8, 1960, the building was named for George McIntosh Sparks, former president of the college.. Sparks Hall was demolished to make room for the new revitalization project.

=== Housing ===
After the 1996 Summer Olympics were held in Atlanta, Georgia State acquired its first on-campus dormitories in the 2,000-bed Olympic Village housing complex located at the southeast corner of Centennial Olympic Park Drive (formerly Techwood Drive) and North Avenue that was used to board Olympic athletes during the Games. The Village was later sold to the Georgia Institute of Technology and renamed the North Avenue Apartments.

==== University Lofts ====
In August 2002, the 450-bed University Lofts opened at the corner of Edgewood Avenue and Courtland Street on the northeast side of campus as housing for undergraduate students and student-athletes, as well as students with families and graduate students. In 2008, the Lofts were converted into multiperson dormitories as well as apartment-style dorms, raising the bed counts to its current number of 550 residents in 231 apartments.

==== University Commons ====
On August 10, 2007, Georgia State opened the University Commons, a US$165 million complex housing 1,992 students, occupying a city block bounded by Ellis Street, Piedmont Avenue, John Wesley Dobbs Avenue and Jesse Hill Jr. Drive. A GSU economics professor estimated the new dorm could have an economic impact of $10–12 million on downtown Atlanta. The university plans to ultimately accommodate 20% of its enrollment in housing near the downtown campus. With the planned opening of University Commons, it was announced on March 7, 2007, that the Georgia Institute of Technology was acquiring the Olympic Village housing, which is located across North Avenue from the institute. In 2011, the Commons were voted "best overall dorms in the country" by DormSplash.com. This was followed in 2012 by The Fiscal Times rating the Commons as some of the most luxurious dormitories in the country, rated third most "insanely luxurious."

==== Patton Hall ====
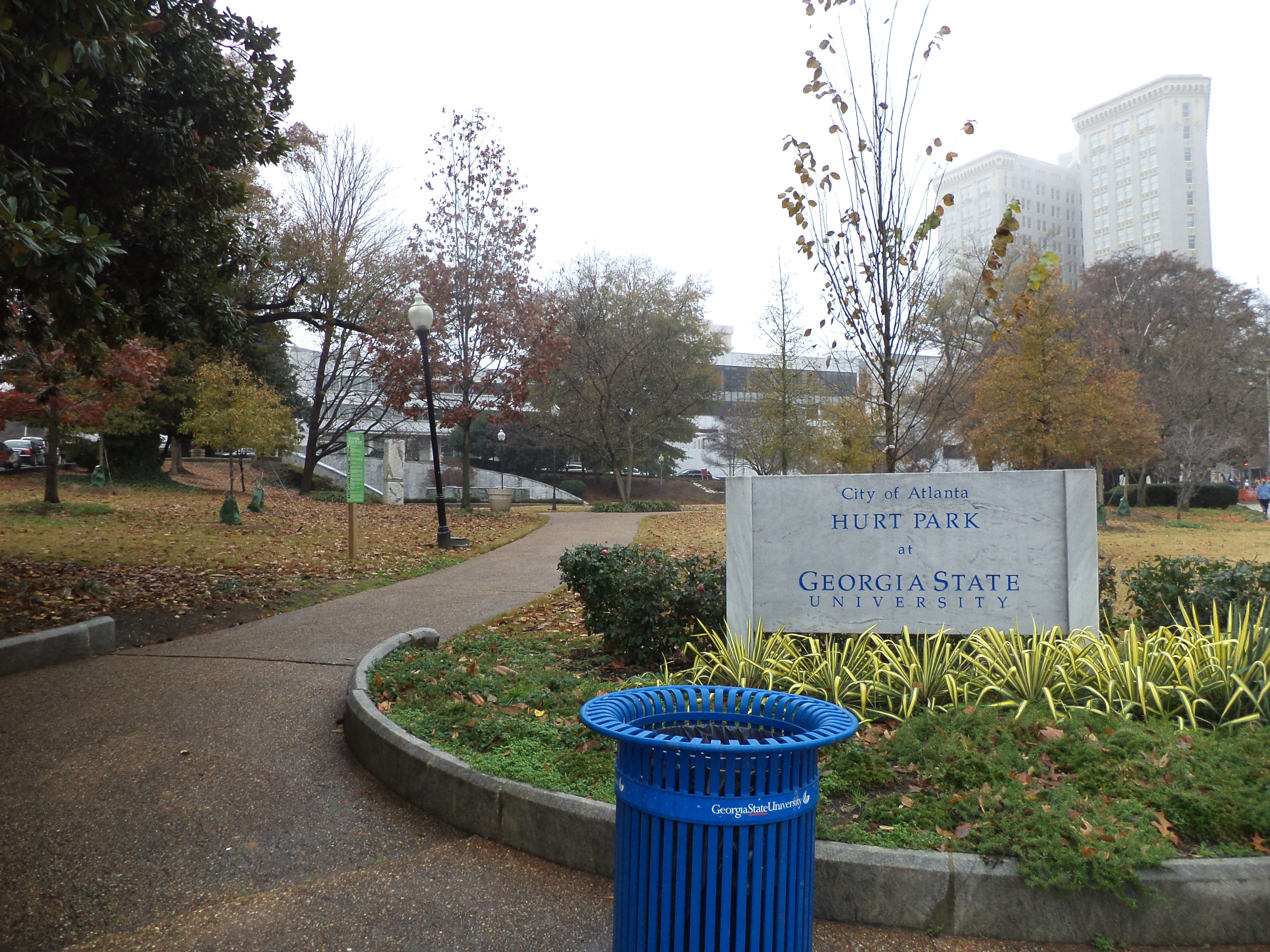
Hurt Park

In the fall of 2009, Georgia State opened a 325-bed residence hall exclusively for freshman students, originally named Freshman Hall. Renamed Patton Hall in 2013 after former Georgia State President Carl Patton, the dorms are located on the corner of Piedmont Avenue and Edgewood Avenue, approximately 0.2 miles from the heart of GSU's campus. The facility includes a 24/4.5 dining hall offering breakfast, lunch, and dinner in a buffet style. The dining hall is open to all Georgia State students, and all residents of Patton Hall are required to have meal plans for the dining hall.

==== Greek housing ====
During the 2010 academic year, Georgia State opened its Greek Housing facility, located adjacent to Patton Hall on Edgewood Avenue. Each of the nine townhomes in the complex features a chapter room, kitchen, and bedrooms ranging from 9–19 beds.

==== Piedmont North ====
Most recently, Georgia State acquired two hotels in downtown Atlanta, the Wyndham Garden Hotel and Baymont Inn and Suites on Piedmont Avenue. The hotels and grounds have been renovated and changed into dorms, Piedmont North Buildings A and B, contributing to the university's transformation into a more traditional campus. The complex now includes living and study space for approximately 1,100 students, as well as green space, recreational areas, and a brand new 12,000-square-foot (1,100 m^{2}) dining hall, the Piedmont North Dining Hall.

==== Piedmont Central ====
On May 14, 2014, the ground was broken on a new, 1,152-bed residence hall named Piedmont Central. The hall received its first residents in fall semester of 2016. The facility includes a 15,000-square-foot dining facility, conference rooms, communal kitchens, study rooms, and laundry facilities.

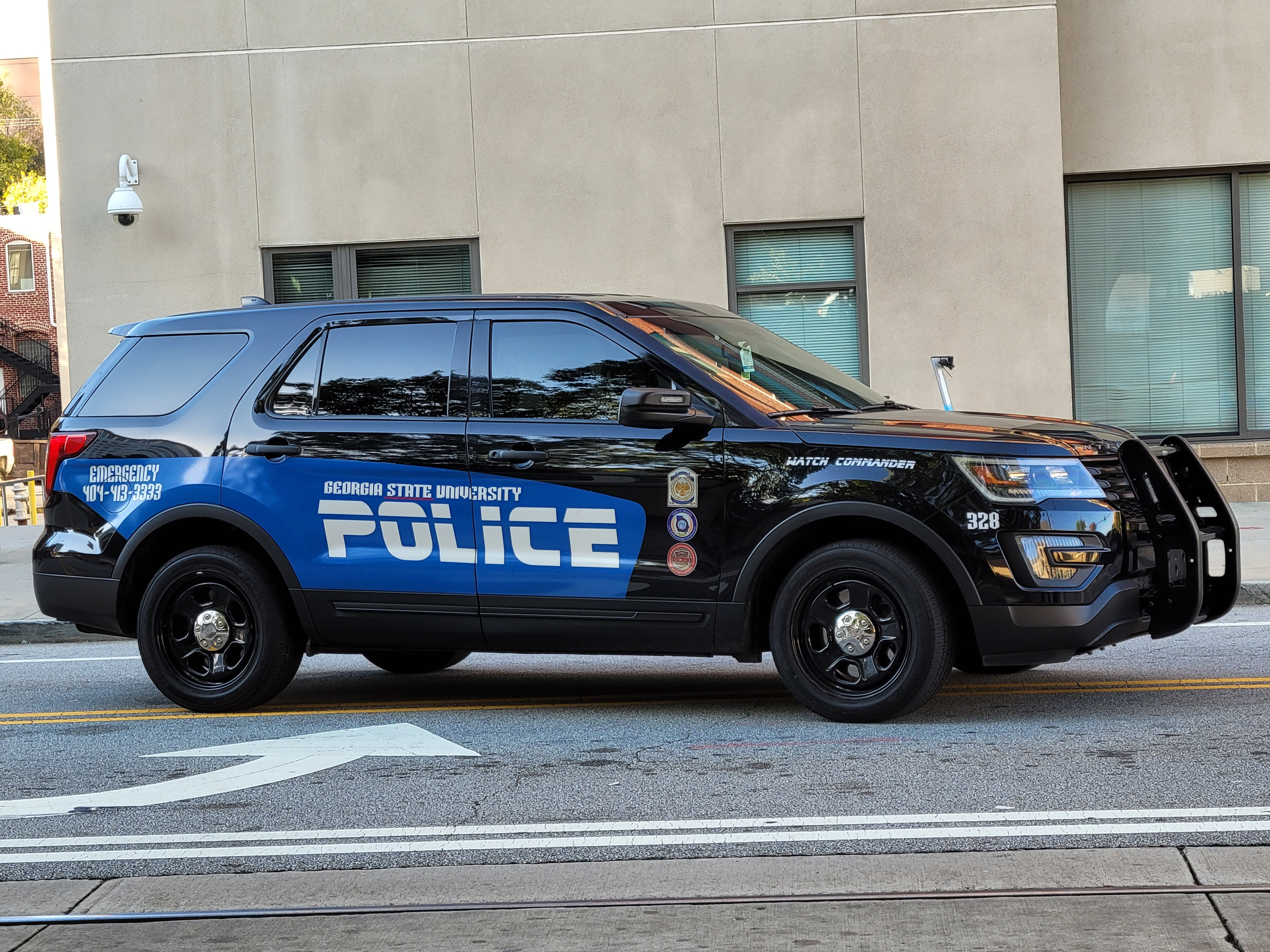
A Georgia State police vehicle on campus in Atlanta

=== Campus security ===
The department is composed of more than 160 state-sworn police officers, 60 full-time security guards, 10 part-time security guards, 16 communications dispatchers and eight staff members, making it the largest campus law enforcement agency in Georgia.

=== Perimeter College ===
Perimeter College consists of five different campuses around the Metro Atlanta region. Campuses in Alpharetta, Clarkston, Decatur, Dunwoody, and Newton County each offer different amenities. The Alpharetta campus consists of two buildings, with students enrolled at that campus having free access to a nearby private gym, as well as access to the other Perimeter campus amenities. The Clarkston campus is a full campus with athletic facilities, (tennis courts, soccer field, gym) and 14 buildings. The Decatur campus includes greenhouses, tennis courts, as well as six academic buildings including a Student Success Center. The Dunwoody campus includes a gym, weight room, soccer field, tennis courts, an observatory, a gazebo, and eight academic buildings. The Newton campus consists of a baseball field, a softball field, a health and recreation center, and two academic buildings.

== Academics ==
Academic rankings

National
- Forbes: 513
- U.S. News & World Report: 198
- Washington Monthly: 156
- WSJ/College Pulse: 501–600

Global
- ARWU: 501–600
- QS: 781-790
- THE: 501–600
- U.S. News & World Report: 560 (tie)

U.S. News University Rankings
Category	Ranking
National Universities	197
Best Undergraduate Teaching	3
Most Innovative Schools	2
Top Performers on Social Mobility	8
Top Public Schools	101
Business: Insurance	4
Business: Management Information Systems	10
Business: Real Estate	11
First-Year Experiences	5
Learning Communities	5

U.S. News Graduate School Rankings
Program	Ranking
Biological Sciences	140
Business: Information Systems	13
Business: Part-time MBA	48
Chemistry	114
Clinical Psychology	62
Criminology	22
Economics	59
Education	45
Education: Best Online Master's in Education Programs	35
Education: Curriculum and Instruction	23
Education: Elementary Teacher Education	21
Education: Secondary Teacher Education	22
Education: Student Counseling and Personnel Services	11
English	99
Fine Arts	131
Health Care Management	39
History	125
Law	67
Law: Clinical Training	26
Law: Dispute Resolution	44
Law: Environmental Law	103
Law: Health Care Law	1
Law: International Law	78
Law: Legal Writing	75
Law: Part-time Law	13
Law: Tax Law	43
Law: Trial Advocacy	21
Mathematics	136
Nursing: Doctor of Nursing Practice	126
Nursing: Master's	99
Physical Therapy	71
Physics	110
Political Science	72
Psychology	112
Public Affairs	21
Public Affairs: Local Government Management	7
Public Affairs: Nonprofit Management	9
Public Affairs: Public Finance and Budgeting	8
Public Affairs: Public Management and Leadership	19
Public Affairs: Public Policy Analysis	22
Public Affairs: Urban Policy	8
Public Health	56
Rehabilitation Counseling	55
Social Work	59
Sociology	71
Speech-Language Pathology	53

U.S. News Global Rankings
Category	Ranking
Arts and Humanities	107
Economics and Business	87
Neuroscience Behavior	370
Physics	518
Social Sciences and Public Health	177
Space Science	196

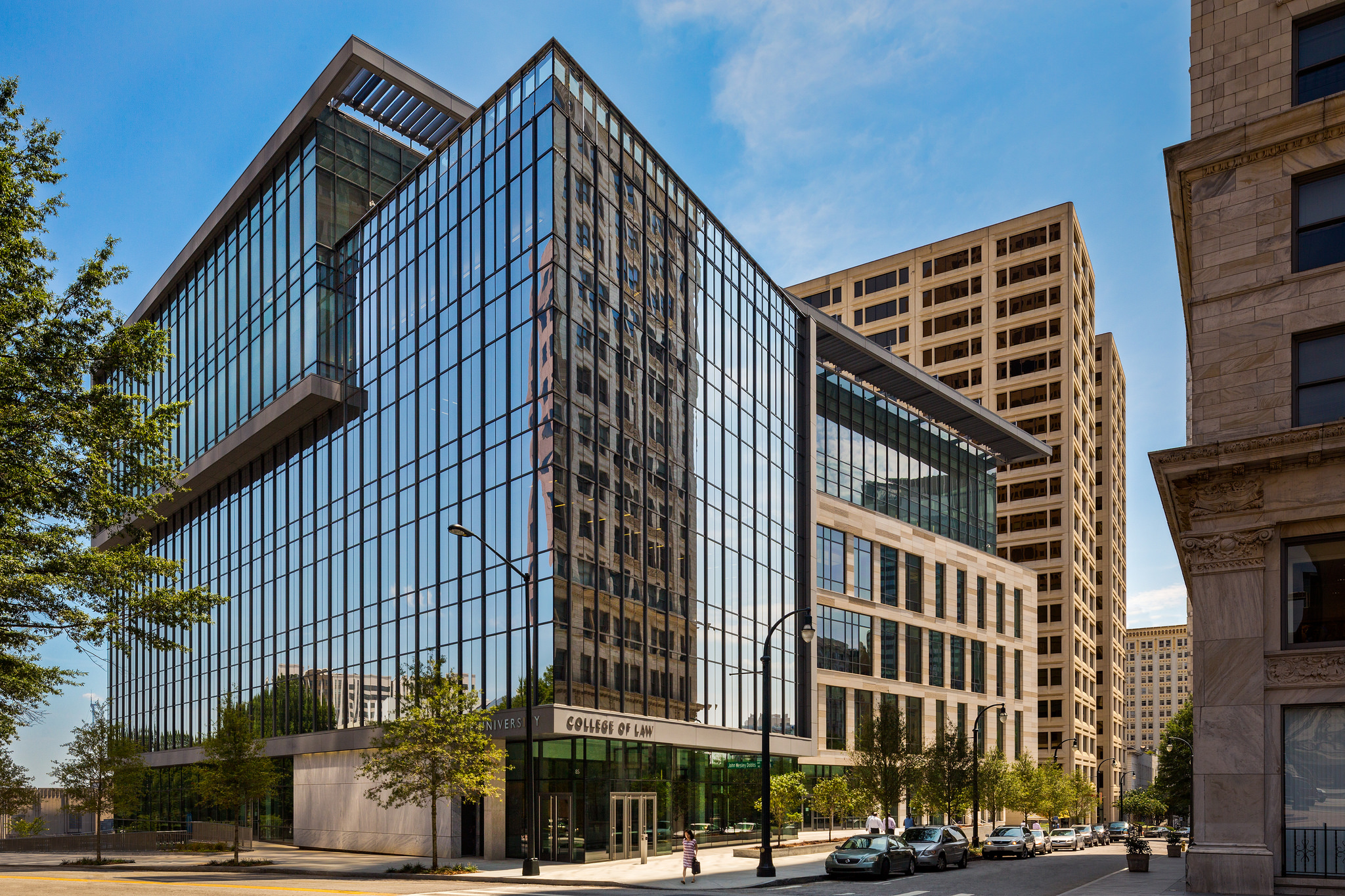
GSU College of Law

The President of Georgia State University (currently Dr. M. Brian Blake) is the head administrator and is appointed and overseen by the Georgia Board of Regents.

The university is composed of 11 colleges (although those divisions use "college", "school", or "institute", those titles do not indicate any distinction between them):

=== Schools and colleges ===
- Andrew Young School of Policy Studies
- Byrdine F. Lewis College of Nursing and Health Professions
- College of the Arts
- College of Arts & Sciences
- College of Education and Human Development
- J. Mack Robinson College of Business
- College of Law
- School of Public Health
- Institute for Biomedical Sciences
- Honors College
- Perimeter College†

† Unlike the other colleges that make up the university, students accepted to Perimeter College only have access to the five suburban campuses associated with that college and not the main campus. A Perimeter College student must apply for acceptance to the main downtown campus for access to bachelor's degrees.

== Research and innovation ==
GSU is one of four research universities in the University System of Georgia. In 2023, U.S. News & World Report ranked GSU the No. 2 most innovative university in the nation. Georgia State University's research and development expenditures of over $200 million for the 2018 fiscal year ranked first in the nation among universities without an engineering or medical school. In 2013, Georgia State University was one of six universities in the nation and the only in Georgia to be named a "Next Generation University" by New America for its proven commitment to expanding enrollment, focus on the neediest of students, and the success of its ethnically diverse student body.

=== Libraries ===
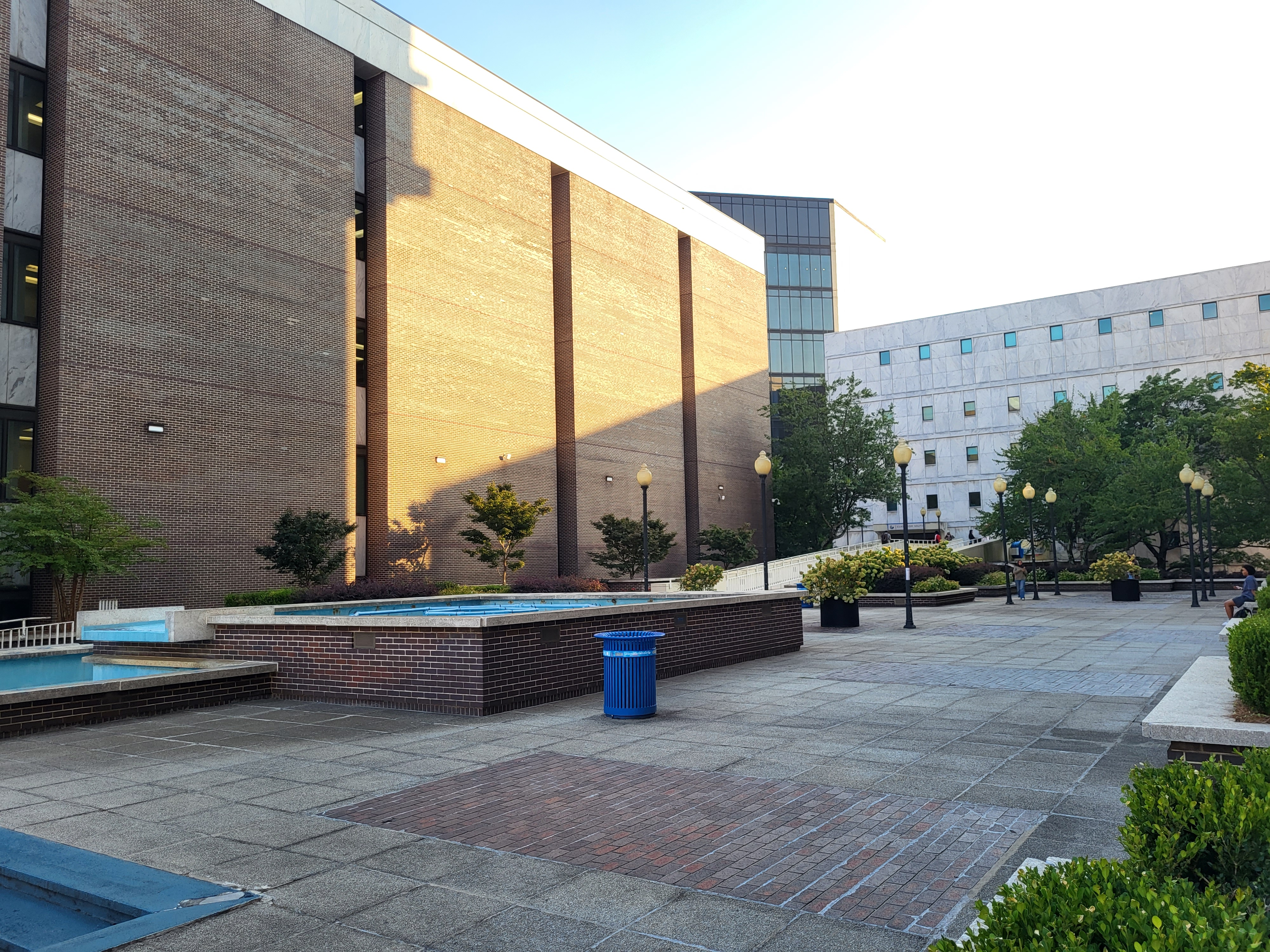
View of the plaza with Library North, Library South, and the Classroom South Building in the background, as seen in 2025.

Georgia State houses three university libraries. Additionally, many academic departments provide libraries for their students. The University Library (formerly known as the William Russell Pullen Library), housed in Library North and Library South, contains more than 1.4 million volumes, including 8,000 active serials and nearly 22,000 media materials. The library provides access to numerous electronic periodical and resource indexes (many with full text), more than 14,000 electronic journals, and about 30,000 electronic books. It is also a Federal Document Depository and holds more than 820,000 government documents with electronic access to many additional titles. From December 2015 through February 2016, the University Library received significant media attention for several armed robberies and other crimes against GSU students within the facility.

=== SURAgrid ===
On August 31, 2006, Georgia State announced that it would be participating in a supercomputing grid with the installation of an IBM P575 Supercomputer in its Network Operations Center. Through an initiative known as SURAGrid, eventually, 24 universities in 15 states throughout the Southeast United States will form the research backbone and at its peak, the network will be able to perform over 10 trillion calculations per second. University of Georgia and Kennesaw State University are also part of the SURAGrid.

=== Physics and astronomy ===
Physics at Georgia State is split between physics and astronomy. Areas of research range from atomic physics, biophysics, condensed matter physics, neurophysics, nuclear physics, and physics education and innovative instruction. The astronomy program uses many observatories, including the Lowell Observatory in Flagstaff, Arizona and the Small and Moderate Aperture Research Telescope System (or SMARTS) in Chile, and the CHARA array on Mount Wilson Observatory in Los Angeles County, California, Hard Labor Creek Observatory in Rutledge, Georgia, and the Urban Life Observatory, all of which are operated by Georgia State. Astronomy is now also a partner in the Apache Point Observatory 3.5-m telescope.

=== Biology ===
Biological research at Georgia State is divided into four categories; applied and environmental microbiology (AEM), cellular molecular biology and physiology (CMBP), molecular genetics and biochemistry, and neurobiology and behavior. The AEM program concentrates on the environmental, industrial, and medical aspects of microbiology, including bioremediation, toxicology, genetics, cellular responses, and natural product biosynthesis. Cellular and molecular biology and physiology focuses on the function and regulation of eukaryotic cells and organisms, doing research including signal transduction, cancer immunology, virology, immunology, and diabetes research. The MGB program ranges from lower eukaryotic programmed cell death to viral RNA replication. The neurobiology and behavior program is involved in research focusing on topics such as neurobiology, behavior, hormonal action, developmental neurobiology, and vertebrate sexual plasticity, to name a few.

Georgia State is currently the only university in the United States operating a BSL-4 lab (the highest bio-safety level) at level 4 conditions. These labs are currently used to investigate herpes B virus, hantavirus, and ebola.

=== Research centers ===
The College of Arts and Science is home to several centers, institutes, and areas of focus, under which the departments of chemistry, biology, psychology, and other college-wide departments can collaborate on interdisciplinary subjects.

- The Language Research Center specializes in language research, with bonobos and chimpanzees. Kanzi, a male bonobo raised at the center, has become famous after learning to communicate via lexigram with his researchers.
- The Center for Neuromics promotes the study of the nervous system using informatics and computational approaches.
- The Neuroscience Institute comprises neuroscience faculty in all departments across the College of Arts and Sciences.
- The Center for Research on Atypical Development and Learning was founded in 1998 to stimulate basic and applied research spanning developmental, clinical, and education psychology, neuropsychology, special education, and speech-language pathology.

Likewise, several university-level institutes exist, allowing collaboration between departments throughout the university as a whole.

- The Center for Behavioral Neuroscience is composed of more than 60 researchers from seven other Atlanta institutions, including Emory University and Georgia Tech. The institute was originally established in 1998 by a grant from the Robert W. Woodruff Foundation and expanded in November 1999 to become one of the National Science Foundation's Science and Technology Centers.
- The Center for Diagnostics and Therapeutics is housed in the Petit Science Center; the center's goals include developing highly sought-after biomarker-guided therapies and imaging agents and translating that research into clinically useful diagnostic and therapeutic agents.
- Center for Nano-Optics
- The Center for High Angular Resolution Astronomy at Georgia State University hosts one of the world's most powerful optical stellar interferometers, the Center for High Angular Resolution Astronomy, atop Mt. Wilson, California; in 2007, this telescope array became the firually obtain an image the surface of another sunlike star. The array is composed of multiple telescopes, each containing a light-collecting mirror 1 m in diameter. The combination of these telescopes works as a single unit, allowing for ultra-high-resolution imaging.
- The Center for Neuroinflammation and Cardiometabolic Diseases focuses on how brain inflammation may contribuseveralber of serious health conditions.
- The Center for Advancing Brain Imaging is a joint venture between Georgia State University and Georgia Tech providing state-of-the-art neuroimaging facilities for studying brain-behaviour relations in children and adults.
- The Center for Studies on Africa and its Diaspora is a multidisciplinary hub that supports research and academic initiatives, artistic efforts, and public programming, including exhibits, lectures, and conferences, and advance policy proposals that target issues of concern to the African diaspora across the university and the broader community
- The Atlanta Global Studies Center is a partnership with Georgia Tech that seeks to enhance access to advanced language learning and help deepen knowledge of global and intercultural issues for students, faculty, and the public.
- Georgia State and the LGBTQ Institute of the National Center for Civil and Human Rights established a partnership focusing on critical issues facing LGBT communities in the South.

The Institute for Biomedical Sciences operates as own college within the university.

The College of Arts and Sciences also maintains several areas of focus for cross-disciplinary study:

- Molecular Basis of Disease is a program in computational biomedicine stretching over six departments and supports undergraduate and graduate research.
- Brains and Behavior promotes research broadly related to the neurosciences, sponsoring student fellowships and seeding grants for research.
- Biosensors and Diagnostics
- Biomolecular Structure and Interactions
- New Therapeutic Agents and Approaches
- TReNDS Center – The Center for Translational Research in Neuroimaging and Data Science (TReNDS) is a tri-institutional effort supported by Georgia State, the Georgia Institute of Technology, and Emory University that is focused on making better use of complex brain imaging data through improved analto identifyifying biomarkers that can help address brain health and disease.

== Student life ==
=== Student media ===
Georgia State University Student Media is divided into five organizations:

- Album 88, a full-power radio station with nighttime hours on WRAS 88.5 FM and 24/7 broadcast online and on HD radio
- Neo Network (NeoN), a student-run media network that publishes original, on-demand video content
- New South, a national literary journal edited by graduate students
- The Signal, a daily website/weekly student newspaper
- Underground, undergraduate arts and literature journal
- Student Media also publishes DMGATL, a mobile app for both Android and iOS that provides access to GSU student media.

Additional student-produced media outside of this division include:

- Creative License, an annual student-edited literature and arts publication from Perimeter College: The magazine is funded by Perimeter College's Student Activity Fee and edited under the advisement of the college's English faculty.

=== Diversity ===
Undergraduate demographics as of Fall 2023
Race and ethnicity	Total
Asian	17%
Black	42%
White	17%
Hispanic	15%
Two or more races	5%
International student	4%
Unknown	1%
Economic diversity
Low-income (Note: The percentage of students who received an income-based federal Pell grant intended for low-income students.)	52%
Affluent (Note: The percentage of students who are a part of the American middle class at the bare minimum.)	48%

Georgia State University has achieved the most ethnically diverse campus in Georgia and one of the most ethnically diverse in the nation. As of 2020, Asians and Hispanics are the fastest growing demographics on campus.

=== Student facilities ===
==== Student Recreation Center ====
The on-campus Recreation Center features racquetball courts, a squash court, a 7,000-square-foot free-weight area, an aquatic center, a 35-foot climbing wall, game rooms, exercise rooms, aerobics, dance, and martial arts studios, and a gymnasium containing four basketball/volleyball courts. The top level includes a running track and omni gym. The aquatic center features a 9-lane lap pool, a "leisure pool" with vortex, a spa, and a sauna. The omni gym is outfitted to allow for different sports, including badminton, basketball, fencing, arena flag football, indoor soccer, and volleyball.

==== Indian Creek Lodge ====
Land in Indian Creek was purchased by the university in 1938, and in 1974 operation of the swimming pool in the facility was taken over by Recreation Services. Tennis courts, Indian Creek Lodge, and the rest of the 15.5 acres were taken over by Recreation Services in 1991.

==== Panthersville ====
The university's outdoor intramural fields are currently located in Panthersville, a suburb of Atlanta. These facilities include two large lighted fields, a sundeck, restrooms, and parking. New land has been purchased by the university east of the University Commons to make room for new intramural fields.

==== Cinefest ====
Georgia State University operates Cinefest Film Theater, a student-run movie theater in the school's University Center. Cinefest exhibits a wide array of motion pictures including international cinema, art house films, revival house movies, and second-run Hollywood fare. Cinefest also has had numerous classic 35-mm film festivals including the Film Fatale Film Festival, and the Summer Camp Nightmare Festival. These festivals often feature rare prints that cannot be seen anywhere else. It has played host to various special events including screening films for The Atlanta Underground Film Festival, the Atlanta Asian Film Festival, the Atlanta Philosophy Film Festival, and DragonCon. The theatre has 135 seats and is free to all Georgia State students, or $3 before 5 pm and $5 after 5 pm. The theatre was first named Cinefest in 1991, but was known as the Lyceum Film Series.

==== Panther Dining ====
Three dining halls are at Georgia State, one in Patton Hall, one in Piedmont Central, and another in Piedmont North dorms. In addition to these, food courts are in the University Center and in the Student Center.

=== Campus transportation ===
==== Panther Express ====
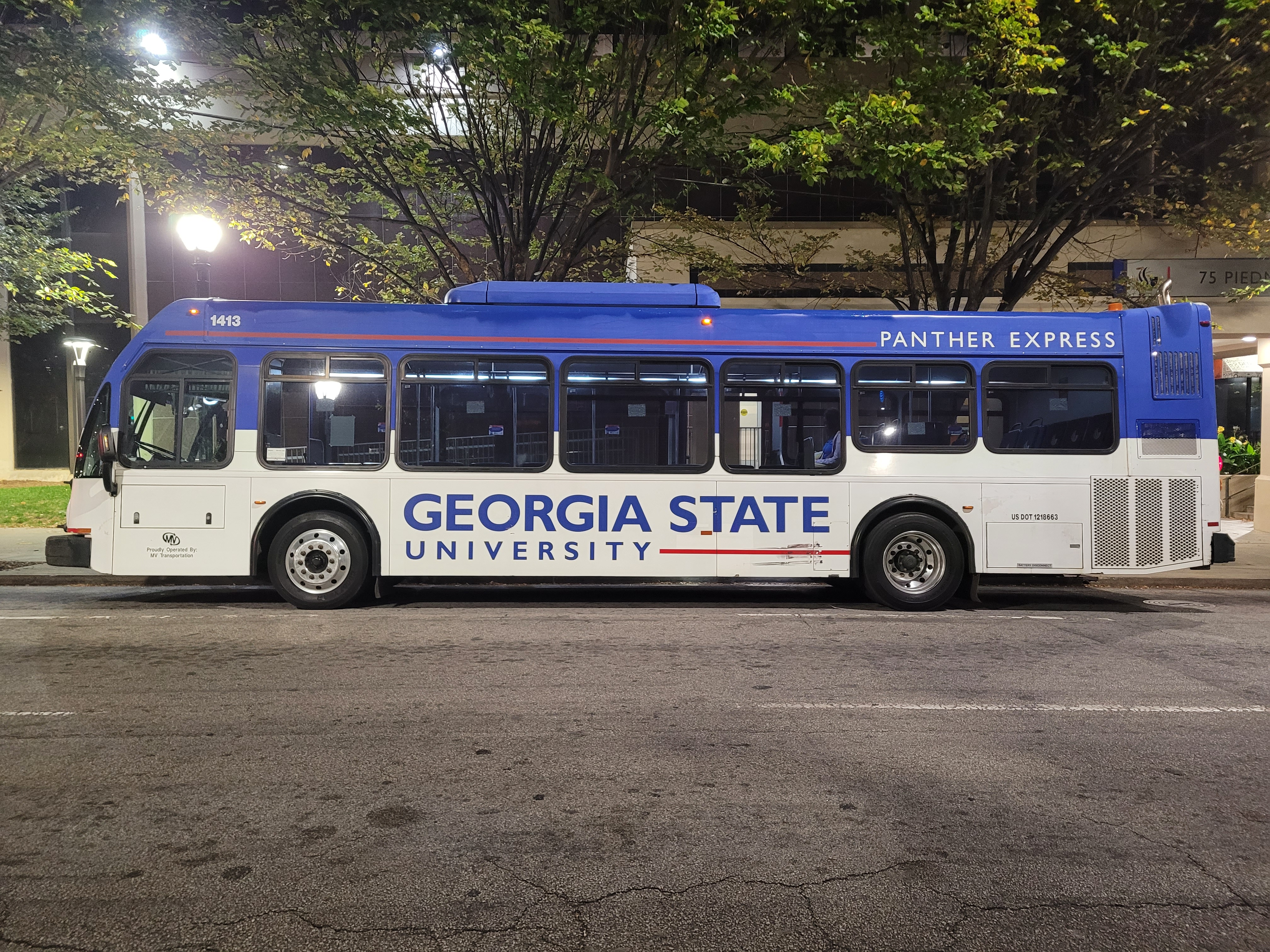
GSU Panther Express

The university provides shuttles circulating campus following four different routes. The blue route circulates from the parking lots of Turner Field to the heart of campus with stops at Langdale Hall and Sparks Hall. The red route circulates between the main campus and the Aderhold Learning Center with stops at the Arts and Humanities buildinnd at the Rialto Center/Aderhold. The green route stops at the Student Center, the University Commons, and Piedmont North. The purple route is active on weekends, stopping at the Arts and Humanities building, the Student Center, the University Commons, Piedmont North, and the Rialto Center/Aderhold.

==== MARTA ====
Atlanta's mass transit system, MARTA, provides Georgia State students with access to the system at a reduced rate when bought through the university. Georgia State is served by three MARTA rail stations; the Georgia State Station next to the Petit Science Center on the Blue and Green lines, Five Points Station on the Red, Gold, Blue, and Green lines with accommodations for both the Aderhold Learning Center and main campus, and the Peachtree Center Station on the Red and Gold lines, giving access to the Aderhold Learning Center, the University Commons, and the Piedmont North dormitories.

In December 2014, streetcars returned to Atlanta for the first time in 60 years. The Atlanta Streetcar's current route transverses the campus along Edgewood and Auburn Avenues. It connects the main campus to the Aderhold building and Rialto Center for the Arts in Fairlie-Poplar, as well as the Sweet Auburn Curb Market, the Sweet Auburn Historic District, and popular dining and nightlife establishments along Edgewood Avenue.

=== Student government ===
The representative body of Georgia State students is the Student Government Association (SGA). The SGA is composed of a president, executive vice president, campus-specific vice presidents, a speaker, a senate made up of representatives from each college, a judicial branch, and an election commission. The SGA represents student interests to university leadership, appoints students to serve on key university committees, and selects student representatives to the University Senate.

=== Greek life ===
Georgia State University is home to 31 fraternities and sororities: seven of the North American Interfraternity Conference (IFC), five of the National Panhellenic Conference (NPC), seven of the National Pan-Hellenic Council (NPHC), and 12 multicultural organizations operating as the Multicultural Greek Council (MGC). Georgia State added traditional Greek housing in 2010 to house five sororities and four fraternities.

== Arts ==
=== Rialto Center ===
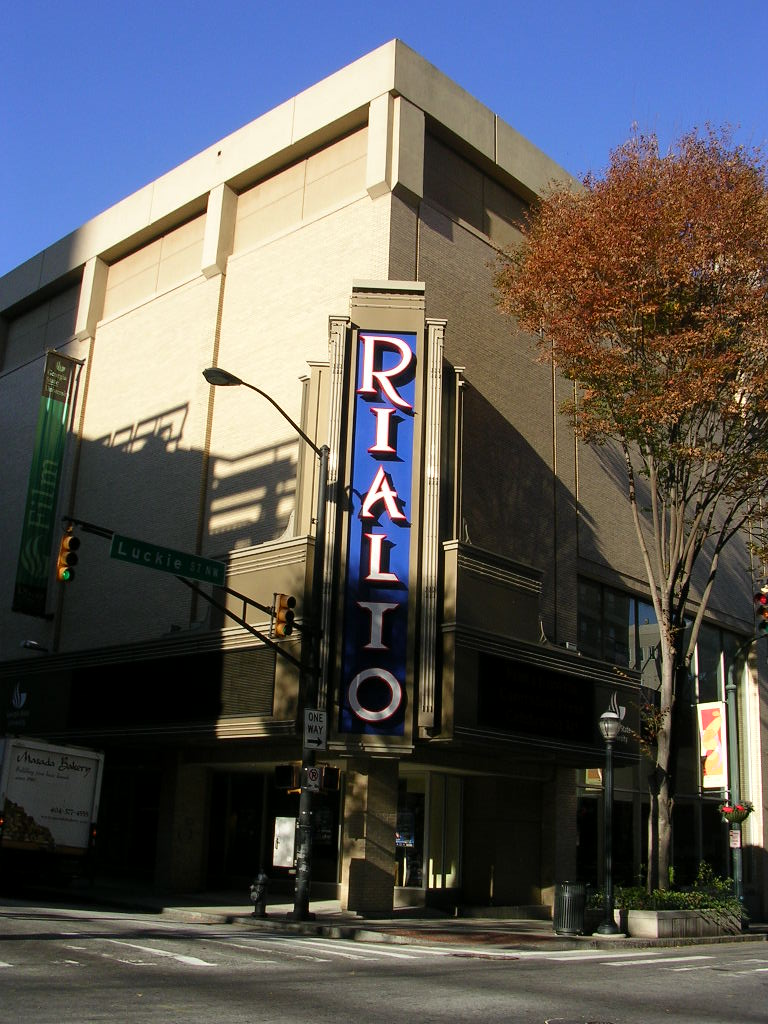
Rialto Center

Georgia State University makes notable contributions to the cultural vitality of the downtown Atlanta community. A prominent cultural stage is the Rialto Center for the Arts, an 833-seat performing arts venue located in the heart of the Fairlie-Poplar district in downtown Atlanta. The venue is home to the Rialto Series, presenting the best of national and international jazz, world music, and dance; School of Music performances; the Atlanta Film Festival, and many others. The School of Music holds concerts featuring faculty, students, and guest performers in the Kopleff Recital Hall throughout the year. In addition, the Art Galleries, based in the Ernest G. Welch School of Art and Design, feature special exhibitions, student and faculty works, and visiting artist collections.

=== DAEL ===
The Digital Arts and Entertainment Laboratory (DAEL), housed in the Department of Communication, offers equipment and facilities for digital media research and production. The DAEL also holds a media festival featuring different productions and media produced by students.

=== Digital Aquarium ===
Georgia State hosts a multimedia lab allowing students access to multimedia-editing workstations, professional software, technology training workshops, and equipment that can be checked out. The facility also hosts a pro-level recording studio featuring full soundproofing, a dual-screened Mac Pro, a keyboard, and two microphones, although the area is set up to allow for students to bring their own equipment.

== Athletics and traditions ==
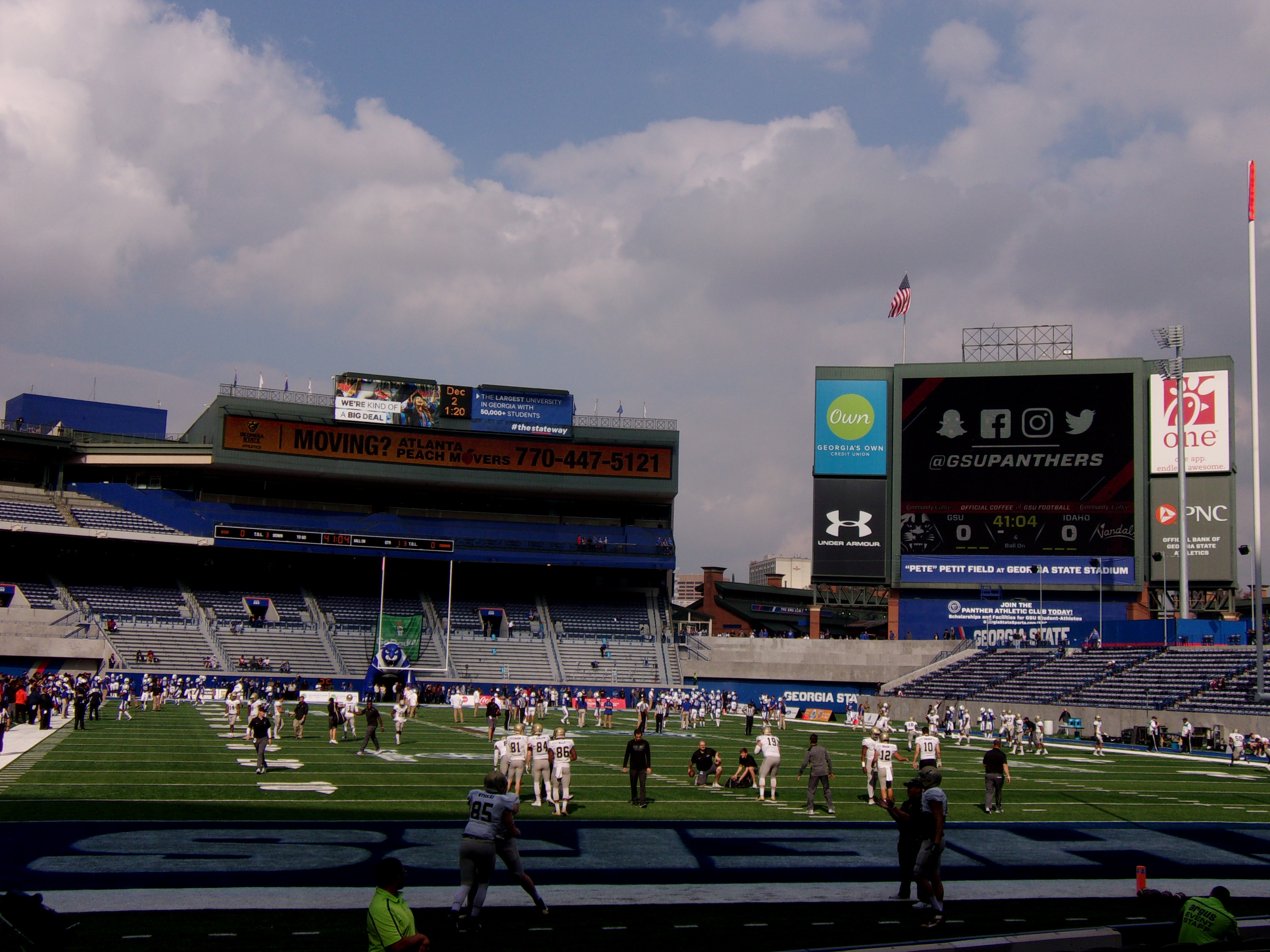
Center Parc Stadium

=== Sports ===
The 16 Georgia State varsity athletic teams compete in the NCAA's Division I, with their football program being in FBS. They are founding members of the Sun Belt Conference. Georgia State's beach volleyball team, competes in Conference USA. The university has won conference championships in basketball (men's and women's), baseball, golf (men's and women's), softball, soccer (men's and women's), women's tennis, and beach volleyball. The beach volleyball team has been ranked among the top ten programs in the country every year since its inception in 2013.

Georgia State began competition in all sports in the Sun Belt Conference in 2013, although it had already played all individual sports in the Sun Belt during the 2012–13 season. This marked a return to the conference that Georgia State had helped found in 1976. Before returning to the Sun Belt Conference, GSU played in the CAA from 2005 to 2013, participating for only one season (2012) as a football school. Before joining the CAA, the Panthers competed in the (then Trans America Athletic Conference, or TAAC) Atlantic Sun Conference, joining in 1983 and leaving for the CAA in 2005.

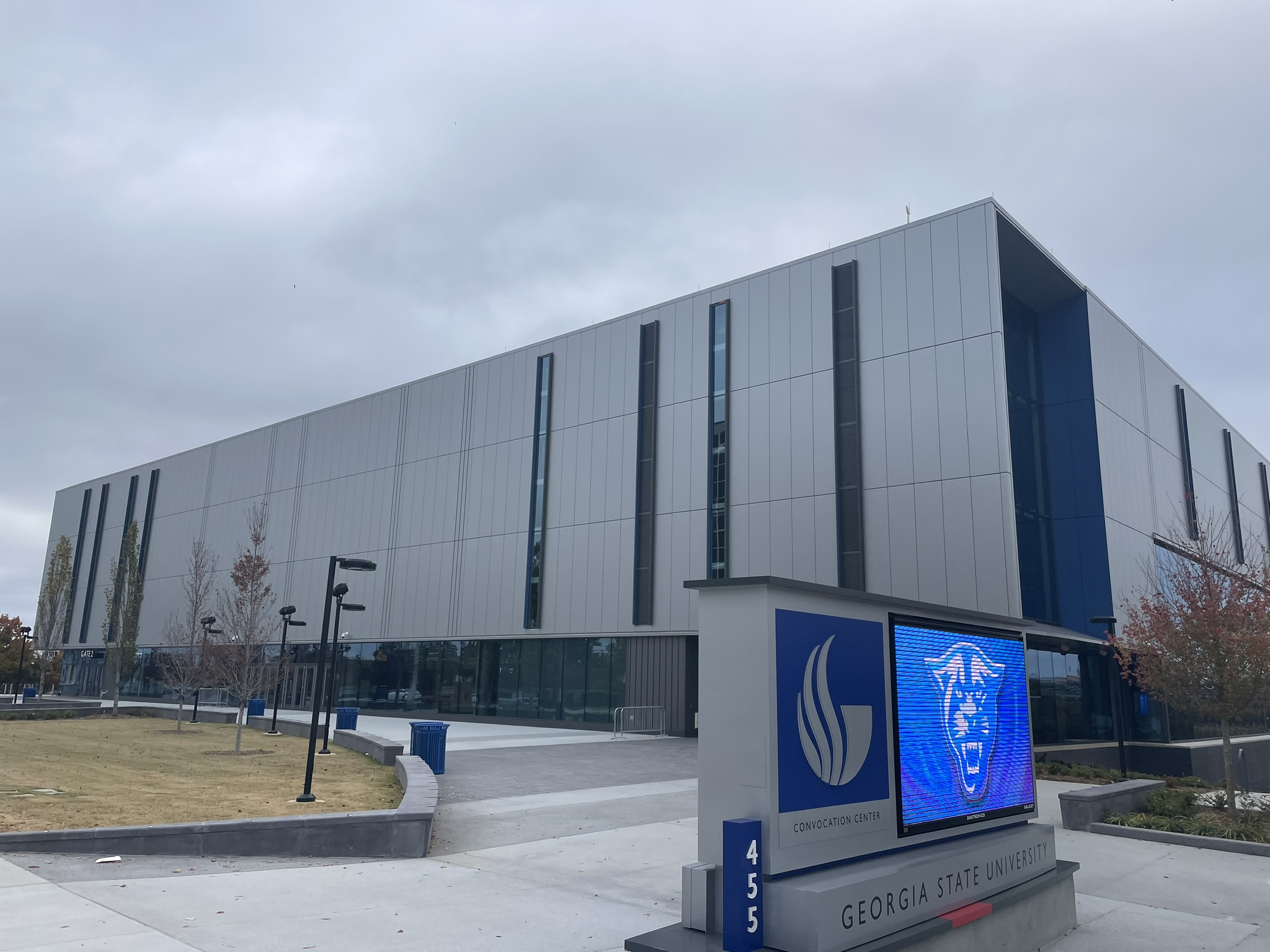
Georgia State Convocation Center, a multi-purpose venue opened in 2022 and home of GSU basketball

Georgia State University charges a fee to each student who enrolls at the school. This fee is used for athletic scholarships and other costs associated with competitive athletics. The athletic fee allows students to use their Panther Card (student identification card) for free access to athletic events.

The Panthers' most historic rivalry is with the Georgia Southern Eagles with basketball being played between the two since 1972. However, rivalries have grown since, including with South Alabama with the two programs starting football within a year of one another and playing each other and having played one another every season since Georgia States football's inception except one.

Georgia State University's first-ever national championship win was in esports in 2019. The university's SMITE: Battleground of the Gods team played against Arizona State University at Dreamhack Atlanta and won with a final score of 2 - 0. The team has since won two additional championships, and participated in a third, becoming the winningest sport in the school's history.

The university also boasts several nonvarsity sports, including badminton, rowing, rugby, and wrestling

=== 1996 Summer Olympic Games ===
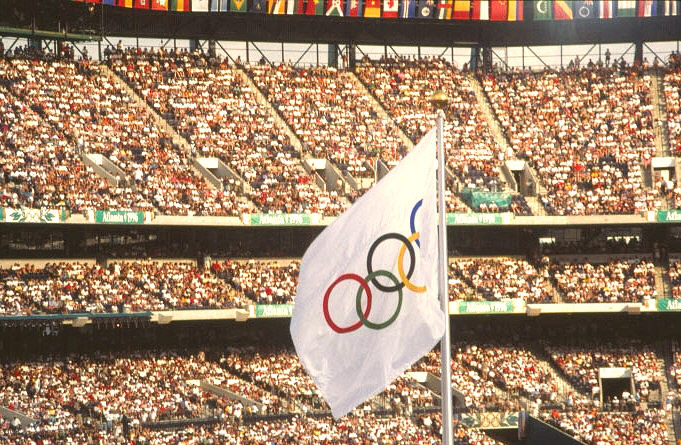
The Olympic flag waves at the 1996 games

Georgia State University was used during the 1996 Summer Olympic Games, with the GSU Sports Arena hosting the badminton matches. Georgia State's prominent position in downtown Atlanta allowed the city to build some of its venues with adaptive reuse in mind to be used by the university. The first on-campus dormitories at the university, the Village, was constructed as part of the Olympic Village to house athletes. This began the metamorphosis of GSU from a commuter college to a massive urban research institute, as well as one of the largest universities in the United States. Centennial Olympic Stadium, host of the opening and closing ceremonies of the Olympics, was after the games converted to Turner Field, home of MLB's Atlanta Braves. After the Braves moved to SunTrust Park in suburban Cobb County, Turner Field and the surrounding grounds were purchased by Georgia State in January 2017. The university converted the stadium to a football field for the school's football team, now called Center Parc Stadium (named Georgia State Stadium until 2020), and is building a new campus baseball stadium on the site of the former Atlanta–Fulton County Stadium, and new classrooms and housing on the lot.

=== Marching band ===
In 2010, Georgia State University established its first-ever marching band, with 150 students successfully auditioning for its inaugural season. In its first year, the band performed at all home football games, a high school marching band exhibition, and (most notably) during the Georgia State vs. Alabama football game on November 18, 2010, in Tuscaloosa. The band is a drum corps-style unit that focuses on precision musicality and movement. Like most ensembles, the band features a colorguard section, but in a departure from typical marching bands, the traditional auxiliary front sideline percussion section, or pit, has been replaced by a four-piece rock band consisting of a lead guitar, bass guitar, drum set, and keyboard synthesizer.

The Georgia State marching band has received many honors, which includes performing in 2013 for the Second inauguration of Barack Obama, the 2014 Macy's Thanksgiving Day Parade, the 2019 Super Bowl LIII halftime show, and the 2022 Tournament of Roses Parade in Pasadena, California.

=== Coat of arms ===
The school's coat of arms is registered in the College of Arms in the City of London. The Latin motto means, "Truth is strong and will conquer" (or alternatively, "Truth is valuable and shall overcome"). The panther holds the symbol of education, with the quill in red to symbolize the fire in Atlanta's city emblem. The gold coin indicates the university's beginnings as a business school. The crown august is a representation of the Stone Mountain granite. The center flame is an eternal flame in honor of the first president, George Sparks, and represents flames of scholarship and the burning of Atlanta.

== Alumni and faculty ==
Since its opening, Georgia State has graduated more than 227,000 alumni. Currently, an estimated 100,000 alumni live in the metro Atlanta area.

== See also ==
- Cambridge University Press v. Patton, a copyright infringement case in which GSU was a defendant
- NOC at Georgia State University
- List of colleges and universities in metropolitan Atlanta
