= Hard Labor Creek Observatory =

Astronomical observatory in Georgia, US

- Organization: Georgia State University
- Location: Rutledge, Georgia
- Coordinates: 33°40′16″N 83°35′38″W
- Altitude: 219 m (719 ft)
- Website: www.astro.gsu.edu/HLCO/

Telescopes
- Plane Wave Instruments Telescope: 0.7 m CDK700
- Plane Wave Instruments Telescope: 0.61 m CDK24
- RC Optical Systems Telescope: 0.51 m RCOS20

Hard Labor Creek Observatory is an astronomical observatory owned and operated by Georgia State University in the United States. It is located within Hard Labor Creek State Park, 50 miles east of the Atlanta, Georgia campus.

== Visiting the Observatory ==
The observatory is open to the public one evening per month during the spring, summer, fall, and winter months. These events are free and are staffed by astronomers from the Department of Physics and Astronomy at Georgia State University. Potential visitors are advised that open houses are subject to cancellation due to inclement weather, and parking is limited so carpooling is highly encouraged. The current open house schedule can be found at GSU Astronomy Open House Schedule.

== See also ==
- List of observatories
