= NOC at Georgia State University =

The Network Operations Center (or NOC) at Georgia State University, renamed the Technology Operations Center (TOC) in 2007, is a 5,500 sq ft (510 m^{2}) showcase facility in downtown Atlanta, Georgia. It is staffed and managed 24x7x365 by the university's Information Systems & Technology (IS&T) department and is part of IS&T's Technology Infrastructure division. A staff of 16 technicians provide monitoring and troubleshooting of network services and environmental control systems such as HVAC and power. The TOC technicians are also in charge of racking all devices, providing power and network connectivity to hosts, and after-hours Help Center support for the university.

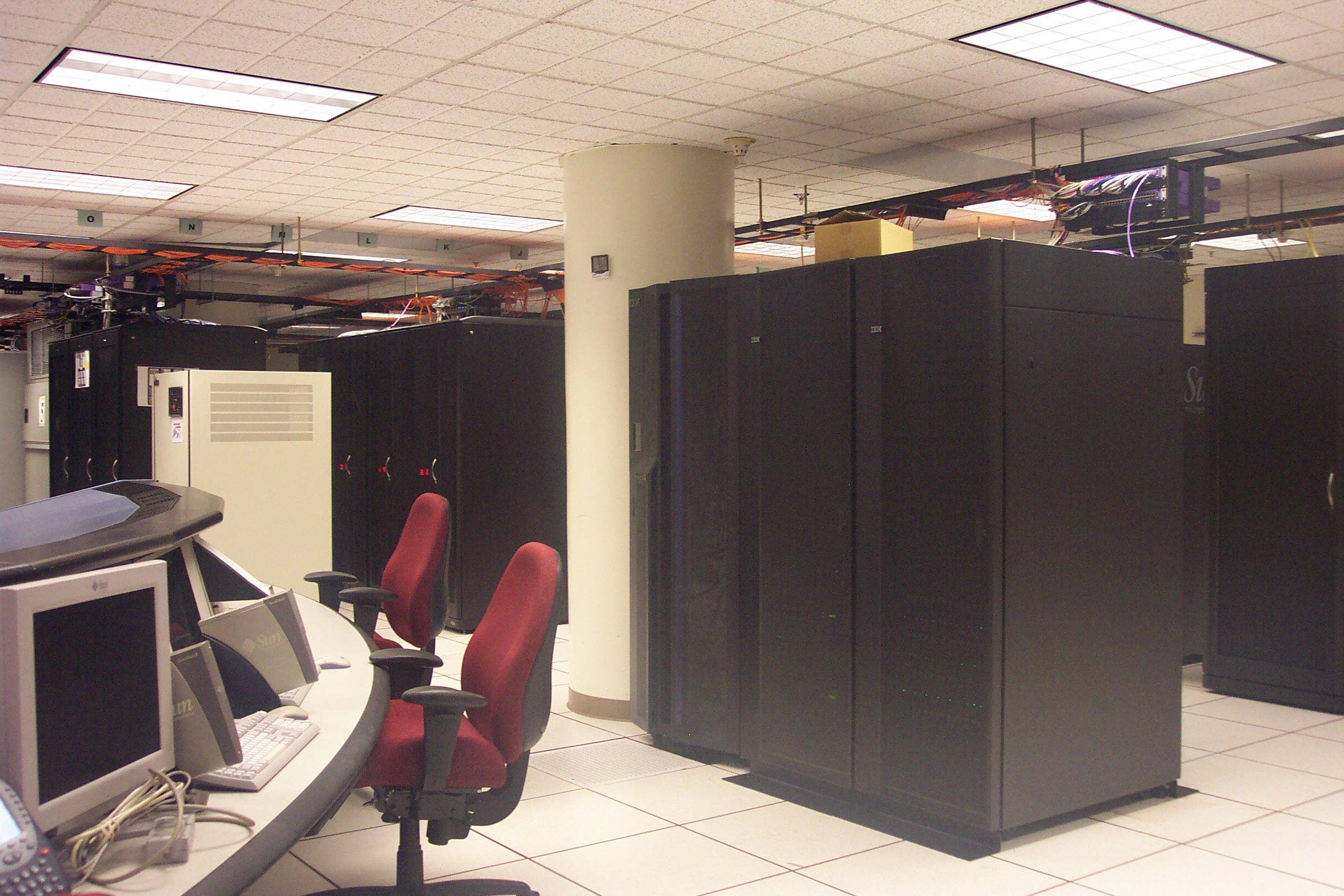
GSU's first IBM P575 Supercomputer

The GSU TOC has been an environmentally "green" facility since 2003. There are no batteries used anywhere in the delivery of protected power to the approximately 500 hosts and servers housed in the NOC. Protected power is provided by a 300 kVA (250 KW) CAT-branded Active Power flywheel/generator system and three ActivePower CoolAir DC UPS units (2 are 100 kVA (80 KW) and 1 is 80 kVA (40 KW)).

During the Fall of 2006, the Georgia State University underwent a US$4,000,000 network renovation where all of the networking equipment across the campus was upgraded and replaced without any detectable downtime to the delivery of campus network services of the TOC facility. This network upgrade has been done in preparation of a new AVAYA IP Telephony (IPT or VoIP) system that replaced the university's analog POTS telecommunications system in the summer of 2007.

GSU's TOC is home to the GALILEO Interconnected Libraries, the New Georgia Encyclopedia, the online presence of the Jimmy Carter Library, and three SURAGrid-networked IBM P575 Supercomputers.

The facility has been the subject of presentations at several national AFCOM conferences as well as three virtual tours hosted by AFCOM.
