= Georgia State University Library =

Academic research library

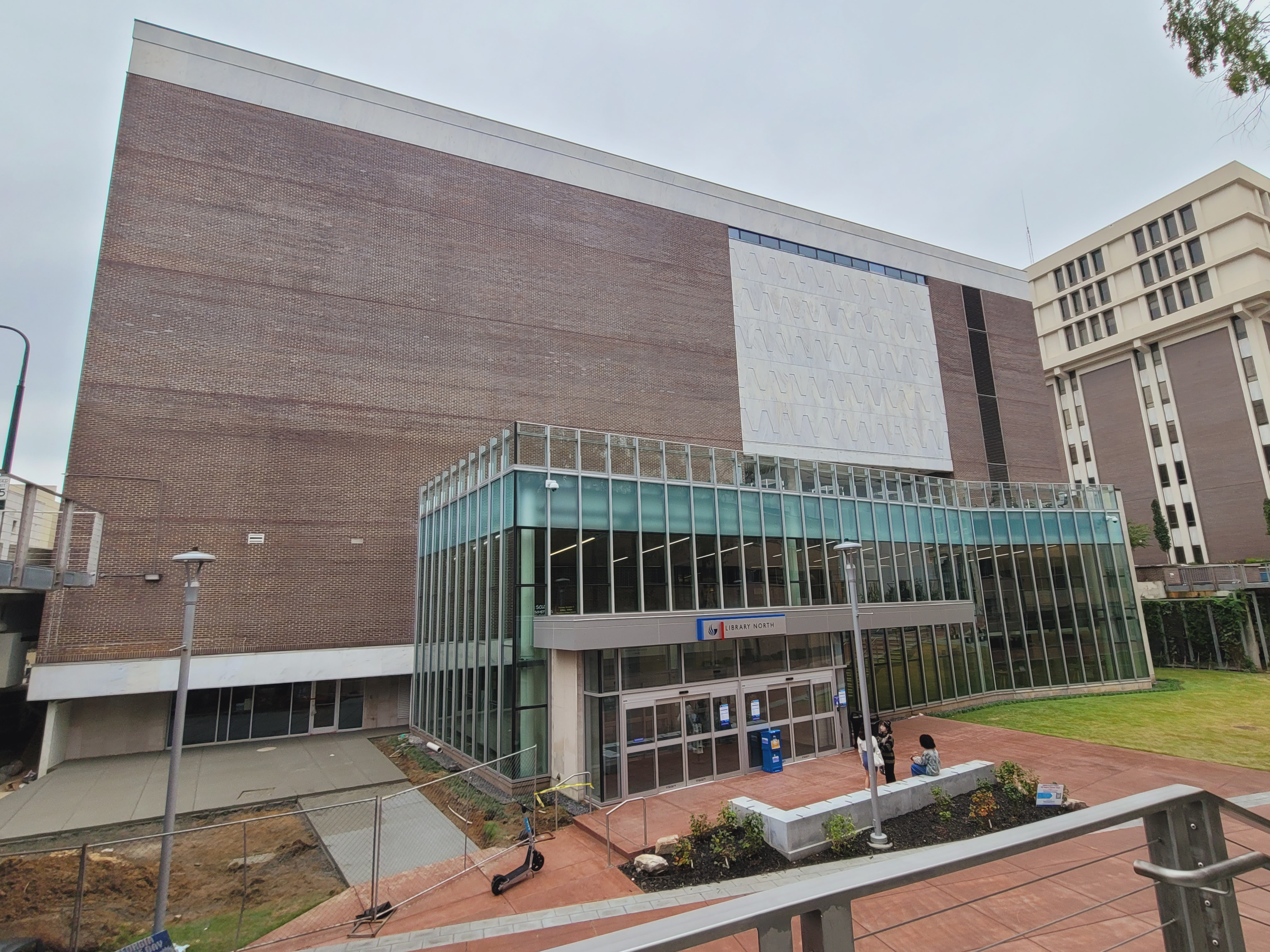
In front of GSU Library North

The Georgia State University Library is an academic research library affiliated with Georgia State University. It has two primary locations, Library North and Library South. The University Library is in the middle of Georgia State's main campus near Gilmer St. and Courtland St.

== Collections ==
The library has over 1.5 million volumes which consist of 28,000 electronic journals, 2,800 periodicals over 820,000 government documents along with general texts

== History ==
The Georgia State University Library was established in 1948 as a branch of the University of Georgia Library. In 1951, the library purchased over 2,000 volumes from James Walter Mason. The original library staff only had three trained employees. After seven years of expansion, the library found a home on the second floor of Sparks Hall in 1955. The Sparks Hall facility contained a reading area and over 150,000 books. In comparison, the modern facility has its own building and is made up of multiple floors and has more than ten times as much media as the Sparks Hall location had.

The present Assembly Hall (registration) area on the second floor of Sparks Hall became the library's home in 1955. The library traces its origins to a number of books that Dr. George Sparks donated from his personal collection to the Georgia Tech Evening School of Commerce in downtown Atlanta. Additional donations followed and included the commerce library of Professor Wayne S. Kell, and a collection of city reports owned by former mayor James S. Key. The library soon required a building of its own to house its burgeoning collections. The first phase of construction resulted in a two-story building, which was completed in 1966. Three additional floors were added to the new library building during the second phase of construction in 1968. The building was completed in 1969, and the surrounding plaza was eventually landscaped.
