= Hard Labour, U.S. Virgin Islands =

Coordinates: 17°44′28″N 64°49′36″W

Hard Labour, United States Virgin Islands
- Village
- Interactive map of Hard Labour, United States Virgin Islands
- Country: United States Virgin Islands
- Island: Saint Croix
- Time zone: UTC-4 (AST)

Hard Labour is a settlement on the island of Saint Croix in the United States Virgin Islands.
