= Hard Labor Creek (Georgia) =

Stream in Georgia, United States

Location
- Country: United States

Physical characteristics
- Source
  - location: Georgia
- Mouth
  - coordinates: 33°37′33″N 83°21′36″W

Hard Labor Creek is a stream in the U.S. state of Georgia. It is a right-bank tributary of the Apalachee River.

According to tradition, the creek's name comes from the difficult task of the slaves who once tilled summer fields near its course.

== See also ==
- Hard Labor Creek State Park
- List of rivers of Georgia
