= Rutledge, Georgia =

- City
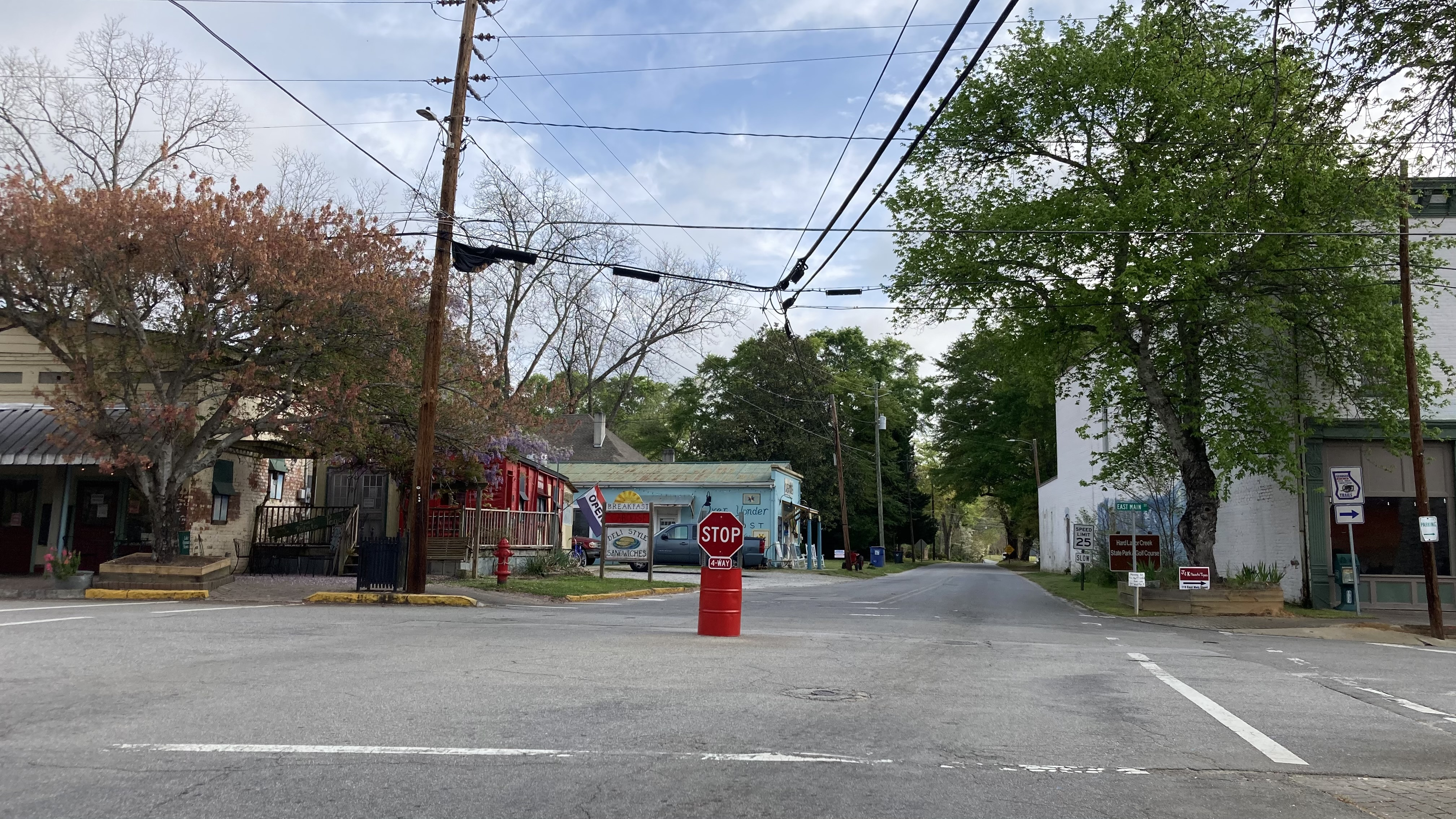
- Rutledge downtown

- Location in Morgan County and the state of Georgia
- Coordinates: 33°37′33″N 83°36′39″W
- Country: United States
- State: Georgia
- County: Morgan

Area
  - Total: 3.32 sq mi (8.60 km^{2})
  - Land: 3.29 sq mi (8.51 km^{2})
  - Water: 0.035 sq mi (0.09 km^{2})
- Elevation: 712 ft (217 m)

Population (2020)
  - Total: 871
  - Density: 265.1/sq mi (102.37/km^{2})
- Time zone: UTC-5 (Eastern (EST))
  - Summer (DST): UTC-4 (EDT)
- ZIP code: 30663
- Area code: 706
- FIPS code: 13-67760
- GNIS feature ID: 0322022
- Website: www.rutledgega.us

Rutledge is a city in Morgan County, Georgia, United States. Founded in 1871, the city had a population of 871 at the 2020 census, up from 781 in 2010.

== History ==
Rutledge had its start in the 1840s when the railroad was extended to that point. The Georgia General Assembly incorporated Rutledge as a town in 1871.

== Geography ==
Rutledge is located in western Morgan County at 33°37′33″N 83°36′39″W (33.625723, -83.610899). U.S. Route 278 passes through the south side of the city, leading east 9 miles (14 km) to Madison, the county seat, and west 15 miles (24 km) to Covington. Interstate 20 passes 2 miles (3 km) south of Rutledge, with access from Exit 105 (Newborn Road).

According to the United States Census Bureau, the city has a total area of 3.3 square miles (8.5 km^{2}), of which 0.04 square miles (0.10 km^{2}), or 1.05%, are water. The south side of the city is drained by Rice Creek, a tributary of Big Indian Creek, which flows southeast to the Little River. The north side of the city drains to Hard Labor Creek, which flows east to the Apalachee River. The entire city is part of the Oconee River watershed. Rutledge is the nearest town to Hard Labor Creek State Park, 2 miles (3 km) north of the city center.

== Demographics ==
Historical population
Census	Pop.	Note	%±
1870	235		—
1880	273		16.2%
1890	588		115.4%
1900	469		−20.2%
1910	696		48.4%
1920	643		−7.6%
1930	523		−18.7%
1940	550		5.2%
1950	482		−12.4%
1960	478		−0.8%
1970	628		31.4%
1980	694		10.5%
1990	659		−5.0%
2000	707		7.3%
2010	781		10.5%
2020	871		11.5%
U.S. Decennial Census

As of the census of 2000, there were 707 people, 260 households, and 197 families residing in the city. In 2020, its population was 871.

== Economy ==
Rutledge is a part of the Covington movie industry.
