= Mostly Ghostly (disambiguation) =

Mostly Ghostly is a series of children's books.

Mostly Ghostly can also mean:

- Mostly Ghostly: Who Let the Ghosts Out?, a 2008 film based on one of the books
- Mostly Ghostly: Have You Met My Ghoulfriend?, a 2014 film and sequel to the 2008 film
- Mostly Ghostly: One Night in Doom House, a 2016 film and sequel to the 2014 film
