= 1996 Kids' Choice Awards =

Children's television awards show program broadcast in 1996

- Date: May 11, 1996
- Location: Universal Studios Hollywood
- Hosted by: Whitney Houston; Rosie O'Donnell

Television/radio coverage
- Network: Nickelodeon
- Viewership: 2.14 million (households)
- Produced by: Mark Offitzer
- Directed by: Glenn Weiss

The 9th Annual Nickelodeon Kids' Choice Awards was held on May 11, 1996, at Universal Studios Hollywood. Whitney Houston hosted the ceremony with Rosie O'Donnell co-hosting via satellite from a New York Harbor cruise, and Mark Curry served as a guest announcer. Houston became the first celebrity to host more than one Kids' Choice Awards.

== Performers ==
Artist(s)	Song(s)
Whitney Houston	"I'm Every Woman"
All-4-One	"These Arms"
Monica	"Before You Walk Out of My Life"
BoDeans	"Closer to Free"

== Winners and nominees ==
Winners are listed first, in bold. Other nominees are in alphabetical order.

=== Movies ===
Favorite Movie	Favorite Movie Actor
**Ace Ventura: When Nature Calls**; Batman Forever; Casper; Toy Story	**Jim Carrey** – Batman Forever as Edward Nygma / The Riddler & Ace Ventura: When Nature Calls as Ace Ventura; Tom Hanks – Apollo 13 as Jim Lovell; Jonathan Taylor Thomas – Tom and Huck as Tom Sawyer; Robin Williams – Jumanji as Alan Parrish
Favorite Movie Actress
**Mary-Kate & Ashley Olsen** – It Takes Two as Amanda Lemmon & Alyssa Callaway; Kirstie Alley – It Takes Two as Diane Burrows; Nicole Kidman – Batman Forever as Dr. Chase Meridian; Alicia Silverstone – Clueless as Cher Horowitz

=== Television ===
Favorite TV Show	Favorite TV Actor
**Home Improvement**; Family Matters; The Fresh Prince of Bel-Air; Sister, Sister	**Tim Allen** – Home Improvement as Tim Taylor; Martin Lawrence – Martin as Martin Payne; Will Smith – The Fresh Prince of Bel-Air as Will Smith; Jaleel White – Family Matters as Steve Urkel
Favorite TV Actress	Favorite Cartoon
**Tia & Tamera Mowry** – Sister, Sister as Tia Landry & Tamera Campbell; Tatyana Ali – The Fresh Prince of Bel-Air as Ashley Banks; Roseanne Barr – Roseanne as Roseanne Conner; Queen Latifah – Living Single as Khadijah James	**Rugrats**; Animaniacs; Doug; The Simpsons

=== Music ===
Favorite Singer	Favorite Group
**Brandy**; Coolio; Janet Jackson; Michael Jackson	**TLC**; All-4-One; Boyz II Men; Green Day
Favorite Song
**"Gangsta's Paradise"** – Coolio; "Baby" – Brandy; "One Sweet Day" – Mariah Carey and Boyz II Men; "Waterfalls" – TLC

=== Sports ===
Favorite Male Athlete	Favorite Female Athlete
**Michael Jordan** (Chicago Bulls); Troy Aikman (Dallas Cowboys); Shaquille O'Neal (Orlando Magic); Emmitt Smith (Dallas Cowboys)	**Kristi Yamaguchi** (Figure skating); Nicole Bobek (Figure skating); Nancy Kerrigan (Figure skating); Shannon Miller (Gymnastics)
Favorite Sports Team
**Orlando Magic**; Atlanta Braves; Dallas Cowboys; San Francisco 49ers

=== Miscellaneous ===
Favorite Video Game	Favorite Animal Star
**Donkey Kong Country**; Ms. Pac-Man; Tiny Toon Adventures: Buster Busts Loose!; X-Men	**Willy – Free Willy 2: The Adventure Home**; Amy – Congo; Babe – Babe; Marcel – Friends
Favorite Book
**Tales to Give You Goosebumps Special Edition #1** by R. L. Stine; The Babysitter IV by R. L. Stine; The Indian in the Cupboard by Lynne Reid Banks; Pocahontas Illustrated Classic adapted by Gina Ingoglia

== Special Recognition ==
=== Hall of Fame ===
- Tim Allen
  - Whoopi Goldberg
  - Whitney Houston
  - Janet Jackson
