= Rotten School =

Book series by R. L. Stine

- Author: R. L. Stine
- Illustrator: Trip Park
- Country: United States
- Language: English
- Publisher: Parachute Publishing
- Published: 2005-2008
- Media type: Print (hardcover, paperback)

Rotten School is a children's book series by R. L. Stine concerning the adventures of children at a boarding school. Each book is written from the perspective of Bernie Bridges, a fourth-grader who lives in his dormitory at Rotten School with his pals Belzer, Feenman and Crench, Beast, Chipmunk, Nosebleed, Billy The Brain and others. Their rivals are Sherman Oaks, a rich spoiled brat, and his buddies Wes Updood and Joe Sweety, from the Nyce House dormitory. Bernie has a crush on a girl by the name of April–May June. Bernie tries to earn money by any means, by selling stuff, stealing from his friends and making bets. Rotten School, much like R. L. Stine's pre-Fear Street works, is a light-hearted comedy instead of horror.

== Books ==
1. The Big Blueberry Barf-Off! (June 2005, ISBN 0-06-078586-1)
2. The Great Smelling Bee (June 2005, ISBN 0-06-078589-6)
3. The Good, the Bad and the Very Slimy (September 2005, ISBN 0-06-078592-6)
4. Lose, Team, Lose! (December 2005, ISBN 0-06-078808-9)
5. Shake, Rattle and Hurl! (February 2006, ISBN 0-06-078811-9)
6. The Heinie Prize (April 2006, ISBN 0-06-078814-3)
7. Dudes, the School is Haunted! (June 2006, ISBN 0-06-078817-8)
8. The Teacher from Heck(August 2006, ISBN 0-06-078821-6)
9. Party Poopers (November 2006, ISBN 0-06-078824-0)
10. The Rottenest Angel (January 2007, ISBN 0-06-078827-5)
11. Punk'd and Skunked (March 2007, ISBN 0-06-078830-5)
12. Battle of the Dum Diddys (April 2007, ISBN 0-06-078833-X)
13. Got Cake? (June 2007, ISBN 0-06-123269-6)
14. Night of the Creepy Things (August 2007, ISBN 0-06-123272-6)
15. Calling All Birdbrains (October 2007, ISBN 0-06-123275-0)
16. Dumb Clucks (January 2008, ISBN 0-06-123278-5)

== Animated adaptation ==
In 2019 Lookout Entertainment signed a deal with Splash Entertainment to produce an animated series based on Rotten School. Lookout's Dan Bernard and Yvonne Bernard were attached as executive producers. It is planned to have 52 episodes of 11 minutes length.
