= Red Rain =

Red rain is precipitation that resembles blood.

It may also refer to:

== Books and film ==
- Batman & Dracula: Red Rain, a comic book from DC Comics
- Red Rain (novel), a 2012 horror novel by R. L. Stine
- Red Rain (1950 film), a Mexican war adventure film
- Red Rain (2013 film), an Indian Malayalam-language science fiction thriller
- Red Rain (2025 film), a Vietnamese war drama film

== Music ==
- Red Rain (album), an album by Dice
- "Red Rain" (song), a song by Peter Gabriel
- "Red Rain", a song by Primal Fear on their album Nuclear Fire
- "Red Rain", a song by Redemption on their album I Am the Storm
- "Red Rain," a song by The White Stripes on their album Get Behind Me Satan

== See also ==
- Red rainstorm warning signal in Hong Kong, colloquially called “red rain” in Cantonese(Chinese: 紅雨; Jyutping: hung4 jyu5)
- Blood rain (disambiguation)
