= Mostly Ghostly: Have You Met My Ghoulfriend? =

- DVD cover
- Directed by: Peter Hewitt
- Screenplay by: Rich Correll
- Based on: Mostly Ghostly: Have You Met My Ghoulfriend? by R. L. Stine
- Produced by: Yvonne Bernard; Steve Stabler; Arthur I. Cohen
- Starring: Bella Thorne; Ryan Ochoa; Roshon Fegan; Madison Pettis; Calum Worthy; Wyatt Bernard; Charlie Hewson; Joan Rivers
- Cinematography: Randy Hart
- Edited by: Sandy Solowitz
- Music by: Patrick Kirst
- Production companies: Lookout Entertainment; Commotion Pictures; Parachute Entertainment
- Distributed by: Universal 1440 Entertainment
- Release date: September 2, 2014
- Running time: 90 minutes
- Country: United States
- Language: English

Mostly Ghostly: Have You Met My Ghoulfriend? is a 2014 American comedy horror fantasy film directed by Peter Hewitt. The film is a sequel to the 2008 film Mostly Ghostly: Who Let the Ghosts Out?. The film is based on the novel Have You Met My Girlfriend? by R. L. Stine, the second book in the Mostly Ghostly series. The film adaptation is the second film in the Mostly Ghostly film series. The film was released on DVD on September 2, 2014, and was broadcast on Disney Channel on October 11.

== Plot ==
Max Doyle has eyes only for Cammie Cahill, a smart and popular red head girl in school. When Max finally scores a date with Cammie on Halloween, Phears, an evil ghost with plans taking over the world, unleashes his ghouls and things go haywire. With the help of his friends - Tara and Nicky - who have turned into ghosts, he tries to destroy Phears before he takes over the world. The next morning, Max tells the truth to Cammie about having two ghost-friends. Cammie believes him and they kiss, implying that they are now dating. A collection of bloopers and outtakes plays during the end credits.

== Cast ==
- Bella Thorne as Cammie Cahill
- Ryan Ochoa as Max Doyle; Ochoa replaces Sterling Beaumon from the first film.
- Roshon Fegan as Nicky Roland; Fegan replaces Luke Benward from the first film.
- Madison Pettis as Tara Roland
- Calum Worthy as Colin Doyle; Worthy replaces Adam Hicks from the first film.
- Charlie Hewson as Phears; Hewson replaces Brian Stepanek from the first film.
- Wyatt Bernard as Bernie
- Eric Allan Kramer as John Doyle; Kramer replaces David DeLuise from the first film.
- Gigi Rice as Harriet Doyle; Rice replaces Kim Rhodes from the first film.
- Joan Rivers^{*} as Grandma Doyle
- Caroline Lagerfelt as Emma
  - Anastasia Baranova as Young Emma
- Chelsea Vale as Chelsea
- Isabella Revel as the Clown Girl
- Abbey Blake as Trick or Treater

^{*} This was Joan Rivers' final film role; she died two days after the film's release

== Reception ==
Common Sense Media criticized the film as "too silly" to be scary, noting that it does not fully deliver on what was promised in the book. DVD Verdict also gave a negative review and criticized its screenplay and pacing.

Felix Vasquez Jr. was slightly more positive and considered the film to be a decent fantasy adventure.

== Sequel ==
The film was followed by a sequel, Mostly Ghostly: One Night in Doom House, with an entirely new cast, which was released on DVD and Digital HD on September 6, 2016.

== See also ==
- List of films set around Halloween
