= The Nightmare Room =

Children's horror anthology television series

- Genre: Anthology; Horror; Black comedy Fantasy; Adventure; Science fiction Supernatural
- Based on: The Nightmare Room by R. L. Stine
- Narrated by: James Avery
- Composers: Kristopher Carter; Josh Kramon
- Country of origin: United States
- Original language: English
- No. of seasons: 1
- No. of episodes: 13

Production
- Executive producers: Paul Bernbaum; Brian Robbins; R. L. Stine; Jane Stine; Michael Tollin
- Producers: Chris Castallo; Billy Crawford; Joe Davola; Dan Kaplow; Shelley Zimmerman
- Cinematography: Michael B. Negrin
- Running time: 20 minutes
- Production companies: Parachute Entertainment; Tollin/Robbins Productions; Warner Bros. Television

Original release
- Network: Kids' WB
- Release: August 31, 2001 – March 16, 2002

The Nightmare Room is an American children's horror anthology television series that aired on Kids' WB. The series was based on the 2000–01 book series of the same name by R. L. Stine. The Nightmare Room originally aired in the United States from August 31, 2001, to March 16, 2002.

== Premise ==
The Nightmare Room is based on fears that children have, such as ghosts and monsters, which normally ended with comments by the narrator whose final words always ended with the words "the nightmare room", then a door with The Nightmare Room logo appeared, closing. In many instances, the series resembled the television series The Twilight Zone with teens taking the role as the main characters, many of whom portrayed the characters were popular child and teen actors at the time, including Amanda Bynes, Frankie Muniz, Justin Berfield, Drake Bell, Brenda Song, Lindsay Felton, Shia LaBeouf, Kaley Cuoco, Dylan and Cole Sprouse. In addition, David Naughton, Robert Englund, Betsy Randle, Tippi Hedren, David Carradine, and Angus Scrimm also worked on some episodes.

The Nightmare Room is one of the only two live-action shows (the other being Brats of the Lost Nebula) that ever aired on Kids' WB. The show was produced by Parachute Entertainment, Tollin/Robbins Productions, and Warner Bros. Television.

== Book titles and summaries ==
1. Don't Forget Me: Danielle Warner and her brother Peter move into a house where the basement is haunted by the ghosts of children who have been forgotten by their friends and families. The ghosts lure living children in by making their friends and families forget about them.
2. Locker 13: Superstitious Luke Green gets assigned Locker #13 on his first day of school and tries to quell the bad luck that goes along with it by finding a good-luck charm. The good-luck charm has a twisted secret of its own.
3. My Name is Evil: A carnival fortune teller accuses Maggie of being evil. Maggie brushes it off as a joke until accidents occur in school and all signs point to Maggie as a suspect.
4. Liar, Liar: Years of lying suddenly catch up with Ross when he finds himself in a parallel world where an evil twin tells him that he will die in two days.
5. Dear Diary, I'm Dead: Alex Smith discovers a diary in a desk that predicts the future, leading to disastrous consequences.
6. They Call Me Creature: Laura must find out why the animals she cares for are attacking her and discovers a horrible creature living in her father's shed.
7. The Howler: Self-proclaimed electronics geek Spencer Turner buys a machine called "The Howler" that lets humans communicate with the dead and summons three ghosts that want to possess Spencer and his friends.
8. Shadow Girl: A bored girl named Selena discovers that she is really a superheroine named Shadow Girl, and, like all superheroes, has an arch-enemy who wants her dead.
9. Camp Nowhere: At summer camp, Russell rows over Forbidden Falls and finds himself in a summer camp haunted by the ghost of an evil Native spirit.
10. Full Moon Halloween: It is a frightful Halloween night as a teacher gets four of his students and tries to discover that one of them may be a werewolf.
11. Scare School: Sam is haunted by an imp at his new school that preys on new students.
12. Visitors: UFO enthusiast Ben Shipley discovers that aliens are covertly invading Earth.

=== The Nightmare Room trilogy ===
- Fear Games: Twelve kids with special abilities have been selected to take part in a reality show called Life Games, set on an island haunted by a psychotic witch.
- What Scares You the Most?: April (one of the contestants) is stranded on the island and must fight her biggest fears in order to escape.
- No Survivors: After her escape in What Scares You the Most?, April must return to the haunted island in order to rid it of the witch's spirits.

== Opening narration ==
At the beginning of each episode, R. L. Stine gives an opening monologue of sorts – in a manner similar to Rod Serling's iconic opening narration for The Twilight Zone – that acts somewhat like a theme song for the series.

When the lights fade and the moon rises, anything can happen. The world becomes a carnival of shocks and chills. A whirling merry-go-round that never stops, spinning faster and faster, taking you on a frightening ride. I'm R. L. Stine, don't fall asleep... or you might find yourself in The Nightmare Room.

— R. L. Stine

Despite the claim of being R. L. Stine, the narration was provided by James Avery of The Fresh Prince of Bel-Air fame. Avery also did the closing narration for each episode.

== Episodes ==
No.	Title	Directed by	Written by	Original release date	Prod. code
1	"Don't Forget Me"	David Jackson	Teleplay by : Paul Bernbaum	August 31, 2001	003
Danielle Warner, (Amanda Bynes) along with her brother Peter (Daniel Hansen) and the rest of her family (Jim Meskimen and Romy Windsor), have just moved into a new house where the basement is haunted by the ghosts of children who have been forgotten by their friends and families. The ghosts lure living children in by making their friends and families forget about them.
2	"Scareful What You Wish For"	Anson Williams	Naomi Janzen	August 31, 2001	008
While packing away all of the toys from his childhood days before his 14th birthday, Dylan Pierce (Shia LaBeouf) is haunted by a strange little boy (played alternately by Dylan and Cole Sprouse) who turns out to be Dylan's favorite childhood doll that came to life thanks to a seemingly fake spell from a birthday magician (Brian Jacobs), but the boy is not willing to let his human friend go. Also starring Tania Raymonde, Marcus T. Paulk, and Betsy Randle.
3	"The Howler"	Steve Dubin	Teleplay by : Scott Murphy	September 29, 2001	006
Three kids Vanessa (Cara DeLizia), Spencer (Jeremy Ray Valdez) and Charlie (Jermaine Williams) find a strange machine called "The Howler" that lets them communicate with ghosts, but the ghosts that come out need three human bodies to possess. Also starring Robert Englund.
4	"Tangled Web"	Ron Oliver	Paul Bernbaum	October 6, 2001	005
An incorrigible liar named Josh Ryan (Justin Berfield) suddenly finds that all his tall tales are coming true after his substitute teacher (David Carradine) tells him that he believes everything he says. Also starring David Naughton, Steve "Sting" Borden, Conni Marie Brazelton, Erik Audé, and Briana Cuoco.
5	"Fear Games"	Ron Oliver	Story by : Paul Bernbaum; Teleplay by : Richard Rossner	October 13, 2001	009
Five teenagers (Lindsay Felton, Hunter Ritter, Eric "Ty" Hodges II, Lena Cardwell, and Lauren Petty) on a Survivor-esque reality game show called "Life Games" hosted by Don Marks (Roger Lodge) must compete in island challenges on Tranquility Island and fight a psychotic witch (Tippi Hedren) who haunts the island. Note: Based on the first book of The Nightmare Room trilogy called "Fear Games".
6	"School Spirit"	Rich Correll	Scott Murphy	October 20, 2001	011
A group of students (Keiko Agena, Michael Galeota, George O. Gore II, Jeffrey Licon, and Madeline Zima) serving detention must help the ghost of a teacher (James Karen) whose contributions are being buried and forgotten. Also starring Jenny Gago.
7	"Full Moon Halloween"	Rich Correll	Teleplay by : Naomi Janzen	October 27, 2001	010
In a connection with "School Spirit", Janet, Todd, Freddy, Dex and Alexis grow suspicious of one another when a werewolf is heard to be on the loose in their town on Halloween.
8	"Four Eyes"	Brian Robbins & Michael B. Negrin	Scott Murphy	December 1, 2001	001
In this homage to the cult horror satire They Live, Jeremy Clark (Josh Zuckerman) receives glasses from his eye doctor (John C. McGinley) while in the company of his friend Cindy (Lynsey Bartilson). He discovers that his new glasses gives him the power to see aliens secretly living among humans and ready to take over the world.
9	"Locker 13"	Ron Oliver	Teleplay by : Richard Rossner	December 8, 2001	007
Luke Greene (Brandon Gilberstadt) is a superstitious boy who is terrified of the consequences when his school assigns him Locker #13, a locker rumored to give the owner eternal bad luck. When he finds a good luck charm in the locker, good things happen to him until he has an encounter with a being named the Fatemaster (Angus Scrimm) who says that he must repay the luck with his own life. Also starring E.J. De La Pena, Boris Cabrera, Mary Stein, and Ken Foree.
10	"Dear Diary, I'm Dead"	Steve Dubin	Teleplay by : Paul Bernbaum	February 2, 2002	004
Alex Sanders (Drake Bell) discovers a diary in his new desk that predicts the future, including his death. Also starring A. J. Trauth, Brenda Song, Percy Daggs III, Kerrie Keane, and Sam Lloyd.
11	"My Name is Evil"	Anson Williams	Teleplay by : Lee Goldberg & Bill Rabkin	February 23, 2002	002
On his birthday, the good-natured Morgan Gray (Marco Gould) is made a fool by Kristin (Kaley Cuoco) and has an encounter with a carnival fortune teller (Pamela Gordon) who claims that he is evil. This leads to a chain of disasters that may or may not be turning him evil. Also starring Audrey Wasilewski and Beth Broderick.
12	"Camp Nowhere" (Part 1)"	James Marshall	Teleplay by : Paul Bernbaum	March 9, 2002	012
Russell (Sam Jones III), Charlotte (Allison Mack), Dave (Kyle Gibson), and Erin (Kathy Wagner) are at summer camp and find themselves in another camp that has been suspended in time thanks to a Native American spirit. Also starring Brandon Quinn and Danielle Fishel.
13	"Camp Nowhere" (Part 2)"	James Marshall	Teleplay by : Paul Bernbaum	March 16, 2002	013
Russell, Charlotte, Dave and Erin must contend with Native American spirits that have captured the kids of Camp Hawkwood. Also starring Dan Byrd, Kevin Meaney, and Frankie Muniz.

== Production ==
The Nightmare Room marked the first new series from author R. L. Stine with Avon serving as publisher for the books following Scholastic discontinuation of Stine's previous series Goosebumps. Stine's publisher, Parachute Publishing, who had worked on packaging other Stine works like Goosebumps and Fear Street described the series as a modern update on The Twilight Zone and was in the process of negotiating promotional partners as well as a television series to promote the brand. In 2001, The WB acquired The Nightmare Room for their Kids' WB programming block's 2001-02 television season marking the network's first ever live-action series.

== Releases ==
In August 2002, eight episodes were released on two DVD volumes. Five episodes remain unreleased.

Name	Release date	Episodes	Region	Additional information
Camp Nowhere	August 20, 2002	4	1	Episodes include: "Camp Nowhere, Parts 1 & 2", "Don't Forget Me", "Full Moon Halloween"; Bonus features include: The Nightmare Is Yours: Shrink or Swim, Do You Dare?, The Nightmare Files, Trailers.
Scareful What You Wish For	August 20, 2002	4	1	Episodes include: "My Name Is Evil", "Scareful What You Wish For", "Tangled Web", "Fear Games".; Bonus features include: The Nightmare Is Yours: Haunted Cave, Do You Dare?, The Nightmare Files, Trailers.

== Awards and nominations ==
Year	Award	Result	Category	Recipient
2002	Emmy Awards	Nominated	Outstanding Achievement in Sound Editing	Michael C. Gutierrez, James L. Pearson, Tony Torretto, Susan Welsh, and Debby Ruby-Winsberg
