= Mostly Ghostly: Who Let the Ghosts Out? =

Mostly Ghostly
- DVD cover
- Directed by: Rich Correll
- Screenplay by: Pat Proft; Rich Correll
- Story by: Jana Godshall
- Based on: Mostly Ghostly: Who Let the Ghosts Out? by R. L. Stine
- Produced by: Yvonne Bernard; Steve Stabler; Arthur I. Cohen; P. Jayakumar
- Starring: Sterling Beaumon; Madison Pettis; Luke Benward; Brian Stepanek; David DeLuise; Kim Rhodes; Adam Hicks; Ali Lohan; Sabrina Bryan
- Cinematography: Barry Wilson
- Edited by: Ryan Correll
- Music by: Peter Neff
- Production companies: Toonz Entertainment, Ltd. Lookout Entertainment; Commotion Pictures
- Distributed by: Universal Studios Family Productions
- Release date: September 30, 2008
- Running time: 98 minutes
- Country: United States
- Language: English
- Budget: US$3.6 million

Mostly Ghostly (also known as Mostly Ghostly: Who Let the Ghosts Out?) is a 2008 American comedy horror fantasy film directed by Rich Correll. The film is based on the novel Who Let the Ghosts Out? by R. L. Stine, the first book in the Mostly Ghostly series. The film adaptation is the first film in the Mostly Ghostly film series. It was released on DVD on September 30, 2008, and was broadcast on Disney Channel on October 31.

== Plot ==
Max Doyle is an 11-year-old whose love of performing magic disappoints his father and draws ridicule from his 15-year-old older brother, Colin. While doing laundry in the basement, Max hears voices. While investigating the source of the sound, he sees a hand come out of the wall. A hidden tunnel behind the wall happens to harbor the evil Phears and his cadre of ghosts. Phears is intent on freeing himself and his minions from the world of ghosts to inhabit the physical world but will be able to do so only on Halloween.

Later, Max finds the ghosts of two children, 11-year-old Nicky and 9-year-old Tara Roland, have suddenly come to occupy his room. They explain that they need his help in learning who they are, how they came to be ghosts, and what has happened to their parents. Although they cannot be seen by anyone but Max, they are able to interact with objects in the physical world. This allows them to frighten a boy who has been bullying Max at school. Shortly thereafter, Tara and Nicky learn it was Phears who killed their parents and now holds the ghosts of their parents captive. During rehearsal of Max's magic show, Tara is captured by Phears.

Max tells Nicky about it and suggests Nicky throw him into the basement tunnel to find her. The same way (most) people do not see ghosts, ghosts cannot see Max. He retrieves a box from Tara that contains a ring to defeat the evil ghosts, but Phears prevents her from escaping with him. Traci, a girl Max has been crushing on, becomes his assistant for his magic show. They perform with the help of Nicky moving objects around, making it appear as if it was Max moving them with his magic. On Halloween, Phears finally breaks the tunnel wall and crashes the show.

There, Max chants the spell (From the light of earth the dark descends, should they return that all depends, when hands point up to moonlit skies, on 10–31 the darkness dies) and Phears' minions are sent back to the depths of the earth. Max receives applause from the audience who believed that everything was part of the show, while Phears himself escapes in the form of a roach without anyone seeing him.

== Cast ==
- Sterling Beaumon as Max Doyle: An eleven-year-old boy who is forced to keep Nicky and Tara away from their enemy, Phears, because only he can see them.
- Madison Pettis as Tara Roland: A nine-year-old ghost of a young girl who likes Max more than her brother, Nicky. She is the youngest. She lived in the house before the Doyles moved in.
- Luke Benward as Nicholas "Nicky" Roland: Tara's 11-year-old older brother who sometimes dislikes Max.
- Brian Stepanek as Phears: An evil ghost who is after Nicky and Tara after taking their parents.
- David DeLuise as John Doyle: Max and Colin's father
- Kim Rhodes as Harriet Doyle: Max and Colin's mother
- Adam Hicks as Colin Doyle: Max's 15-year-old older brother
- Ali Lohan as Traci Walker: A popular girl that Max has a crush on.
- Sabrina Bryan as Mrs. Murray: Max's elementary teacher

== Sequel ==
A sequel, Mostly Ghostly: Have You Met My Ghoulfriend?, was released on DVD on September 2, 2014. Madison Pettis reprised her role as Tara, with new additions Bella Thorne, Calum Worthy, Ryan Ochoa, Eric Allan Kramer and Roshon Fegan signed onto the film. Charlie Hewson replaced Brian Stepanek as the character of Phears.

== See also ==
- List of ghost films
- List of films set around Halloween
