= Dangerous Girls =

Novel by R. L. Stine

- First edition
- Author: R. L. Stine
- Language: English
- Series: Dangerous Girls
- Genre: Horror fiction, young adult literature
- Published: HarperCollins (2003)
- Publication place: United States
- Media type: Print
- Pages: 247 (first edition)
- ISBN: 0-06-053080-4
- OCLC: 51969348
- LC Class: PZ7.S86037 Dan 2003
- Followed by: The Taste of Night

Dangerous Girls is the first novel in the Dangerous Girls duology by R. L. Stine. First published in 2003, the novel was followed by a sequel, The Taste of Night, in 2004. Dangerous Girls has won awards, including the ALA Quick Pick for Reluctant Young Adult Readers and the New York Public Library Book for the Teen Age.

In the novel, Renz, a vampire, bites Destiny Weller at Camp Blue Moon. Afterwards, she and her twin sister Livvy return home in Dark Springs with a craving for blood. Destiny's father cures Destiny, but is unable to cure Livvy, who, together with Ross, changes into a blackbird and flies off into the sky.

== Plot ==
During summer break, at Camp Blue Moon, the vampire Lorenzo "Renz" Angelini sinks his fangs into the throat of sixteen-year-old Destiny Weller. Afterwards, she and her twin sister Livvy return home in Dark Springs with a craving for blood; they feed on a rabbit's blood and Destiny sucks blood from a package of liver. While at the house of a family friend, Coach Bauer, the sisters meet Marjory Bauer, another vampire. Marjory says she is undead and the Restorer can restore their life.

At Dark Springs High School, in Renz's office, Destiny talks with him and decides he is the Restorer. She asks him if he will help her and her twin. He says that he will come and take care of her at the senior overnight. Back at her house, Destiny greets her friend Nakeisha Johnson, who tells her Renz was left out of the camp yearbook and there are no photos of him. From this, Destiny determines that Renz is actually a vampire and not the Restorer.

During the senior overnight, Destiny meets Renz, shoves a wooden tent pole through his body and kills him. Her father appears, and tells her that he is the Restorer. He cures her, and they go and find Livvy and her friend Ross Starr at the edge of a grassy clearing. Livvy tells Destiny and her father that she has been immortal since camp, and that she and Ross exchanged blood. Livvy and Ross change into blackbirds, and fly off into the black sky.

== Background ==
At the time of publication, R. L. Stine was 59 years old and had already authored over 330 books for children and young adults, including the Fear Street and Goosebumps series of books. Published in the 1990s, both his Fear Street series, which was oriented towards young adults, and his Goosebumps series, oriented towards children, were successful, with the Goosebumps series selling more than 300 million books. Stine had both series on hiatus while writing other novels.

Living in New York City, Stine recalls walking a dog in a park, when the title for the novel flashed into his mind. He says he started thinking of what the 'Dangerous Girls' would be, thought of vampires, and "sort of went from there". Stine was excited about the book as it gave him the chance to write for teenagers again. Stine did research to follow existing vampire lore but admitted to adding "good vampires" who would restore victims.

Dangerous Girls was first published in 2003 by HarperCollins in hardcover. In 2010, it was published together with its sequel in the book Bitten.

== Reception and sequel ==
In 2004, Dangerous Girls was selected as a New York Public Library Book for the Teen Age and listed as an American Library Association (ALA) Quick Pick for Reluctant Young Adult Readers. The paperback edition was published in 2004 (ISBN 0-06-053082-0) and listed as a 2005 ALA Popular Paperback for Young Adults.

Rachel Manija Brown of Green Man Review stated that there is nothing new or original, poignant, or interesting about the novel and that it is "just lifeless, cranked-out pages by a writer on autopilot". Kimberly L. Paone from the School Library Journal wrote that the novel had little character development and predictable story lines and that there "are a few surprises, but nothing particularly innovative".

Publishers Weekly described it as a "fast and breezy vampire tale punctuated with a few nasty shocks" and stated that "Stine sends his characters through the details of a plot that is basically all chase". Pittsburgh Post-Gazette's Karen MacPherson stated that Dangerous Girls "moves along at a fast clip, powered by short chapters with cliffhanger endings and weirdly interesting characters". Sarah Sawtelle from Teenreads.com commented that it was a bit slow at times, but it was one of Stine's best books.

A sequel of the novel, The Taste of Night, was first published in August 2004 by HarperCollins as the second novel in the Dangerous Girls series. When asked if there will be a third Dangerous Girls book, Stine stated that the series ended with the second one.
