= Haunted Lighthouse =

- Directed by: Joe Dante
- Written by: Sam Hamm
- Story by: R. L. Stine
- Produced by: Michael Finnell; Jini Dayaneni; Yvonne Bernard; Neal Allen
- Starring: Christopher Lloyd; Lea Thompson; Michael McKean; Bobby Edner; Matt Weinberg; Sara Paxton; Daveigh Chase
- Cinematography: Sean MacLeod Phillips
- Edited by: Marshall Harvey
- Music by: Chris Stone
- Production company: Busch Entertainment Corporation
- Distributed by: Simex-Iwerks
- Release date: March 7, 2003
- Running time: 22 minutes
- Country: United States
- Language: English

R.L. Stine's Haunted Lighthouse is a 2003 short 4-D film. It debuted in several United States theme parks, including SeaWorld San Diego and SeaWorld San Antonio. The film was created by Busch Entertainment Corporation and Lookout Entertainment. It is the first 3-D film featured at Busch Gardens Tampa Bay.

The film was shot in 3D using a 5 perforation/70mm format. The effects in the show include water/air jets and seats wired with special effects (buzzers), remote speakers, and other tactile elements. The ending features water cannons mounted under the screen which soak many people in the theater.

== Plot ==
The film tells the story of the ghosts of two children who are cursed to remain forever on a Cape Cod beach and in a 19th-century era lighthouse. After 100 years, they meet two children visiting the beach and take them to the lighthouse, hoping to turn them into ghosts like them.

== Cast ==
- Christopher Lloyd as Cap'n Jack
- Lea Thompson as Peg Van Legge
- Michael McKean as Captain Van Legge
- Bobby Edner as Edgar
- Matt Weinberg as Mike
- Sara Paxton as Ashley
- Daveigh Chase as Annabel
- Rachel Hunter as Rich Widow Feeney
- "Weird Al" Yankovic (cameo) as Waiter

== Later appearances ==
The film had begun shows at the UK theme park Flamingo Land Resort until 2016 when the ride was removed from the park to make way for the hub, an entertainment complex and Go cart track.

Shows formerly located at Busch Gardens Tampa Bay and Busch Gardens Williamsburg were replaced by Pirates 4-D in early 2006.

== See also ==
- List of ghost films
