= Yvonne Bernard =

American film and television producer

Yvonne M. Bernard
- Born: Yvonne Mercedes Bernard; March 6, 1959 (age 67); Tarrytown, New York, United States
- Other name: Yvonne M. Bernard
- Occupations: Film producer, television producer, commercial producer
- Years active: 1998-present

Yvonne Mercedes Bernard (born March 6, 1959) is an American film, television, and commercial producer.

== Life and career ==
Yvonne M. Bernard was born in Tarrytown, New York to Bob and Prudy Bernard. She is the sister of Dan Bernard, who is the SVP of Development and Production at Lookout Entertainment and frequently collaborates with her as a producer on several features and commercial projects. Yvonne has four siblings, Bob Bernard, Daphne Broudy, and the Lynne Bernard. She attended the University of Iowa and graduated with a degree in Journalism and Theater Arts.

Yvonne represents and produces all content for her friend, author R. L. Stine for film and television. She became one of the first women to 100 per cent own a production company in the United States.

After working on a Stine film in Morocco in the early 1990s, Bernard started an import/export business in California. At the time, she was the only American importing Moroccan goods into the United States.

In 1996, Bernard founded Lookout Entertainment Inc., a film, TV, digital media and commercial production company located in Hermosa Beach, California. Bernard/Lookout has gone on to produce commercials, feature films, and television shows. In addition, she has also produced a number of short films that have been used on rides in prominent theme parks including SeaWorld, San Diego and Busch Gardens.

Bernard has served as a producer for films including "Mostly Ghostly: Who Let the Ghosts Out?(2008)", Mostly Ghostly: Have You Met My Ghoulfriend?(2014), "Mostly Ghostly: One Night in Doom House". and Mostly Ghostly: Have You Met My Ghoulfriend? (2016). Throughout her career, she has also been credited an executive producer for the short film Haunted Lighthouse (2003), MTV series Eye Candy (TV series) (2015), and numerous commercials for Ross Stores, Wendy's, Carl's Jr., Mercury Insurance, Smart and Final, Anna's Linens and Shoe PavilionShe is currently working with Warner Bros., Fox, Disney and Lions Gate.

Bernard currently resides in Hermosa Beach, where she lives with her partner Henry, her two children and their two golden retrievers, Gracie and Porter.

== Filmography ==
- 2003: Haunted Lighthouse (executive producer)
- 2008: Mostly Ghostly: Who Let the Ghosts Out?
- 2014: Mostly Ghostly: Have You Met My Ghoulfriend? (executive producer)
- 2015: Eye Candy (TV series) (11 episodes, executive producer)
- 2016 Mostly Ghostly: One Night in Doom House (executive producer)
