= It's the First Day of School...Forever! =

2011 novel by R. L. Stine

First edition (publ. Feiwel and Friends)

It's the First Day of School...Forever! is a children's horror novel by R. L. Stine. The novel is about a middle school boy who relives a terrifying first day of school over and over again. A film adaptation of the book was reported to be in works since 2011. An audio book of the novel was released.

There was a similar time loop theme in the second of the Help! I'm Trapped... series by Todd Strasser, Help! I'm Trapped in the First Day of School.
