= Madison Pettis =

American actress (born 1998)

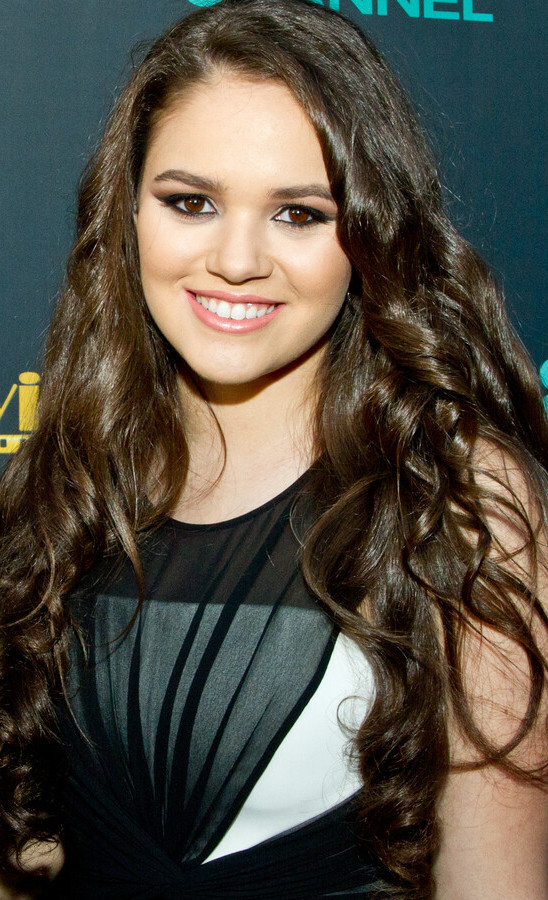
- Pettis in 2015
- Born: Madison Michelle Pettis; July 22, 1998 (age 28); Arlington, Texas
- Occupation: Actress
- Years active: 2005–present

Madison Michelle Pettis (born July 22, 1998) is an American actress. She is known for her roles as Sophie Martinez on the Disney Channel series Cory in the House (2007-2008), Peyton Kelly in the film The Game Plan (2007), Allie Brooks in the YTV/TeenNick series Life with Boys (2011-2013) and Janelle in the Disney XD series Lab Rats (2012-2015).

== Early life ==
Madison Michelle Pettis was born on July 22, 1998, in Arlington, Texas. Her father Steven Pettis is African-American and her mother Michelle Dallava is of Italian, Irish, and French ancestry. She has an older brother named Steven Jr.

== Career ==
Pettis was first noticed when her mother entered into an annual cover search held by FortWorthChild, a local parenting magazine. Early in her career Pettis appeared on Barney & Friends as Bridget, in 2005 and 2006, in which she sang, danced and acted.

Pettis won her first major role in 2006 when she was cast as Peyton Kelly, the long-lost daughter of Dwayne Johnson's quarterback character, in the 2007 Disney film The Game Plan. In 2007 Pettis was cast as Bailey Bryant, the sister of Corbin Bleu's character, in the 2008 film Free Style. In 2008, she had a small role in Dr. Seuss' Horton Hears a Who!, and had a role in A Muppets Christmas: Letters to Santa. She also had a small role as Lorena in the 2008 Will Smith film Seven Pounds. Pettis starred in the 2008 direct-to-video film Mostly Ghostly: Who Let the Ghosts Out?, and its 2014 sequel Mostly Ghostly: Have You Met My Ghoulfriend?, playing the role of ghost Tara Roland.

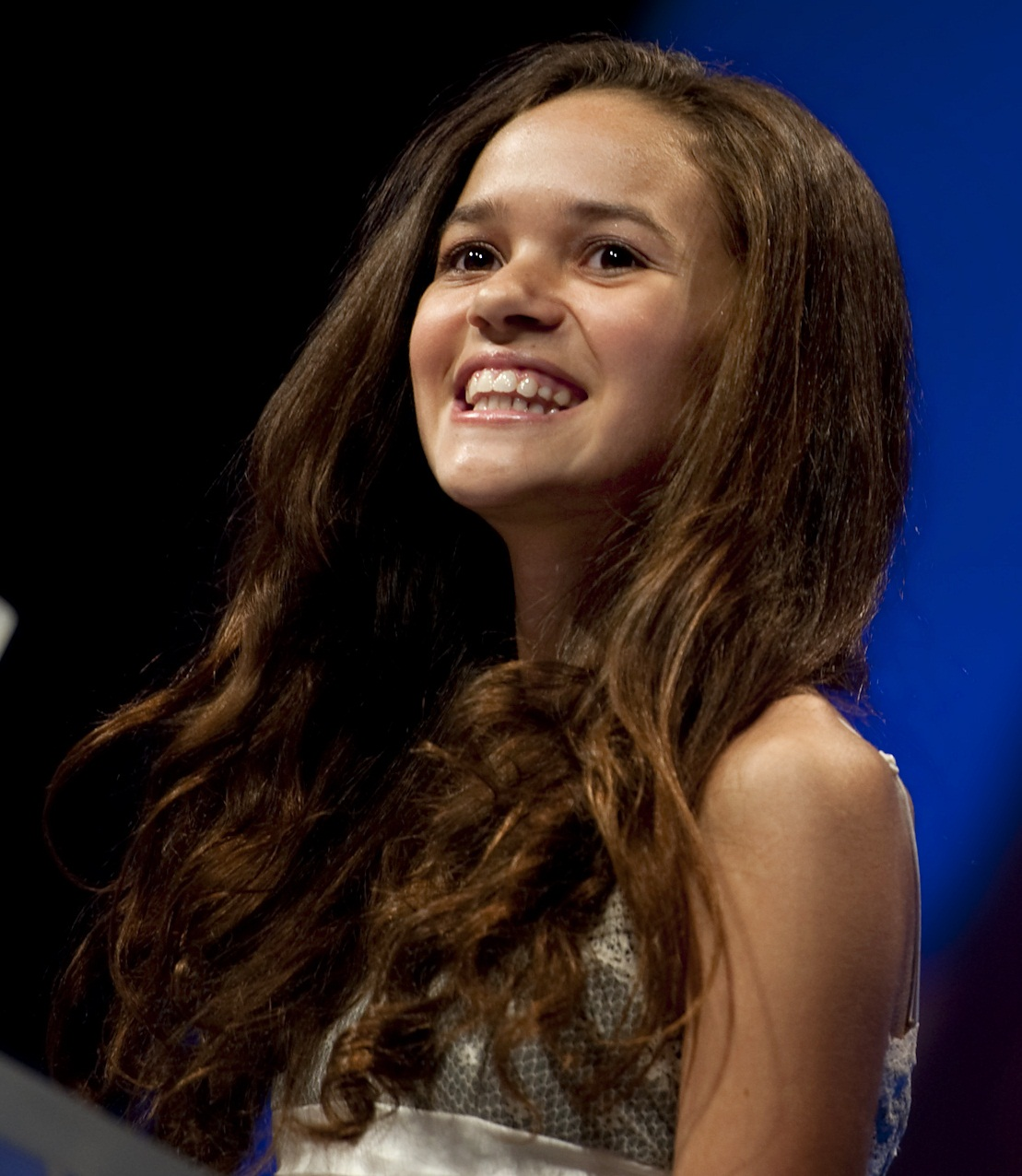
Pettis in Washington, D.C. in 2010.

Pettis starred in Cory in the House as Sophie, the president's daughter and appeared in one episode of Hannah Montana playing the same role. She portrayed Isabelle Tyler in an episode of The 4400. She was the 2007 Disney Channel Games commentator and had a voice role in the Disney Channel animated series Special Agent Oso. In 2009, Pettis appeared as herself on the syndicated version of the game show Are You Smarter than a 5th Grader?

In 2011, Pettis landed two main roles: the voice role of Izzy on the animated series Jake and the Never Land Pirates; and Allie Brooks on the Canadian television series Life with Boys. In 2012, she began a recurring role on the Disney XD series Lab Rats. On October 19, 2014, Pettis confirmed via Facebook that she would be guest starring in The Fosters. In 2015, she was cast in a voice role in the Disney Channel animated series The Lion Guard and its television movie precursor The Lion Guard: Return of the Roar.

== Personal life ==
Pettis is a staunch supporter of military families; her older brother, Steven Pettis Jr., has served in the United States Army. She was "discovered" at age five when her mother entered her into a cover search for a local parenting magazine, FortWorthChild, in her hometown of Arlington, Texas. In addition to her brother Steven, she has a sister, Antoinette Mia Pettis, who is also a model and actress.

She was the youngest entertainer ever invited to tour with the USO, traveling globally to support U.S. troops and their families. She has a known allergy to dairy products. Pettis often describes her style as evolving, ranging from "boho-inspired" with floral prints to "edgier" looks featuring leather jackets and boots. She has served as a brand ambassador and model for several fashion lines, including NFL Apparel and Love Pastry. Before her acting career took off, she was heavily involved in dance, at one point taking 10 different dance classes per week.

Her most notable public relationship was with NBA player Michael Porter Jr.; the two dated from late 2016 through mid-2017. While she has been linked by various media outlets to other young stars like Jaden Smith or Cameron Boyce, she has generally remained private about her dating status since 2017.

== Filmography ==
=== Film ===
Year	Title	Role	Notes
2005	Barney: Can You Sing That Song?	Bridget	
2006	Barney: Let's Make Music	Bridget	
2007	The Game Plan	Peyton Kelly	
2008	Mostly Ghostly	Tara Roland	Direct-to-video film
2008	Seven Pounds	Connie's Daughter	
2008	Free Style	Bailey Bryant	
2010	The Search for Santa Paws	Willamina "Will" Hucklebuckle	Direct-to-video film
2011	Beverly Hills Chihuahua 2	Lala Cortez (voice)	Direct-to-video film
2012	Beverly Hills Chihuahua 3: Viva la Fiesta!	Lala Cortez (voice)	Direct-to-video film
2014	Mostly Ghostly: Have You Met My Ghoulfriend?	Tara Roland	Direct-to-video film
2015	Do You Believe?	Maggie	
2020	American Pie Presents: Girls' Rules	Annie Watson	Direct-to-video film
2021	He's All That	Alden Pierce	
2022	Margaux	Hannah	
2023	Deltopia	Ellery	
2025	The Wrong Paris	Alexis "Lexi" Miller	

=== Television ===
Year	Title	Role	Notes
2006	Jericho	Stacy Clemons	Episode: Pilot
2006	Barney & Friends	Bridget	Episodes: "Pets/Vets", "Playing Games/Fun with Reading"
2007–2008	Cory in the House	Sophie Martinez	Main role
2007	Hannah Montana	Sophie Martinez	Episode: "Take This Job and Love It"
2007	The 4400	Young Isabelle Tyler	Episode: "Daddy's Little Girl"
2008	A Muppets Christmas: Letters to Santa	Claire	Television film
2009	Special Agent Oso	Katie / Tara	2 episodes
2009–2015, 2025	Phineas and Ferb	Adyson Sweetwater (voice)	Recurring role
2009	Are You Smarter than a 5th Grader?	Herself	Recurring contestant
2011–2015	Jake and the Never Land Pirates	Izzy (voice)	Main role (season 1–early season 3)
2011	R.L. Stine's The Haunting Hour	Julie	Episode: "The Black Mask"
2011–2013	Life with Boys	Allie Brooks	Main role
2012–2015	Lab Rats	Janelle	Recurring role,
2015–2016	The Fosters	Daria	Recurring role (season 2–4)
2015	Parenthood	Lynne	Episode: "May God Bless and Keep You Always"
2015	The Lion Guard: Return of the Roar	Zuri (voice)	Television film
2016–2019	The Lion Guard	Zuri (voice)	Recurring role
2016	Late Bloomer	Frankie	Television film
2016	The Real O'Neals	Chloe Perrente	Episode: "The Real Match"
2017	Law & Order: Special Victims Unit	Stacey Vanhoven	Episode: "No Good Reason"
2018–2019	Five Points	Tosh Bennett	Web series; main role
2018	Sofia the First	Princess Cassandra	Episode: "The Lost Pyramid"
2018–2021	Fancy Nancy	Bridgette (voice)	3 episodes
2019–2021	Mickey and the Roadster Racers	Princess Olivia	Voice role; 2 episodes
