= The Killing season 4 =

The Killing
- Season 4
- Season 4 promotional poster
- No. of episodes: 6

Release
- Original network: Netflix
- Original release: August 1, 2014

Season chronology
- ← Previous; Season 3

The fourth and final season of the American crime drama television series The Killing consists of six episodes and was released on Netflix on August 1, 2014. Netflix picked up the series after it was canceled by AMC in 2013.

== Plot ==
The season features detectives Sarah Linden and Stephen Holder handling the fallout of their actions from the previous season while investigating the murder of a family whose only survivor is a member of an all-boys military academy.

== Cast ==
=== Main cast ===
- Mireille Enos as Sarah Linden
- Joel Kinnaman as Stephen Holder
- Gregg Henry as Carl Reddick
- Tyler Ross as Kyle Stansbury, a member of the all-boys military academy and survivor of a family massacre
- Sterling Beaumon as Lincoln Knopf
- Levi Meaden as AJ Fielding
- Liam James as Jack Linden, Sarah's son
- Amy Seimetz as Danette Leeds
- Billy Campbell as Darren Richmond

=== Special guest star ===
- Joan Allen as Colonel Margaret Rayne, headmaster of the all-boys military academy

=== Guest stars ===
- Jewel Staite as Caroline Swift, Holder's girlfriend and a District Attorney
- Katherine Evans as Bethany Skinner, James Skinner's daughter
- Frances Fisher as Gena Geddes, Sarah's mother
- Annie Corley as Regi Darnell, Sarah's social worker and mother figure
- Marin Ireland as Liz Holder, Stephen's sister
- Patti Smith as Dr. Ann Morrison, neurosurgeon / doctor at North Central Hospital
- Eve Harlow as Katrina Nelson, a friend of Kyle Stansbury

== Episodes ==
No. overall	No. in season	Title	Directed by	Written by	Original release date	Prod. code
39	1	"Blood in the Water"	Nicole Kassell	Veena Sud	August 1, 2014	BDH401
Sarah Linden and Stephen Holder deal with the aftermath of her killing James Skinner, the serial killer who was also their boss and her lover. Holder plans a cover-up – he lies to Carl Reddick about their whereabouts at the time; she tells Adrian Seward that Joe Mills killed his mother. While Reddick must officially close the serial killer case, Holder and Linden investigate the murders of the Stansbury family and a survivor, Kyle, the son suspected of the murders whose apparent attempt to also kill himself failed. Holder and Linden question Colonel Margaret Rayne, the superintendent of Kyle's military academy, who believes Kyle is incapable of violence. Holder's girlfriend, District Attorney Caroline Swift, discloses that she is pregnant.
40	2	"Unraveling"	Lodge Kerrigan	Dan Nowak	August 1, 2014	BDH402
Linden becomes further unnerved when she learns that Kyle was shot in the same position as was Skinner when she shot Skinner. At the academy, Kyle is bullied by Lincoln Knopf and others. When the detectives question Kyle about his sister, Phoebe, he says she was an exhibitionist, and he had told his parents. Phoebe had punished Kyle for this by cutting his piano wires. Linden, knowing about family dysfunction, believes Kyle; Holder holds him accountable for the murders. Holder and Linden learn about fingerprints in the Stansbury house belonging to Katrina Nelson, who had assaulted the father. They seek to question Kyle about her but are stopped by Col. Rayne, who threatens Linden with a formal complaint. Later, Katrina tells Kyle that his family "got what they deserved". When Reddick questions Linden about Skinner, she admits they had an affair but suggests he ask Skinner about anything more. She then stakes out the Skinner house, watching his daughter, Bethany, who still unknowingly has a ring from one of the victims.
41	3	"The Good Soldier"	Ed Bianchi	Nicole Yorkin & Dawn Prestwich	August 1, 2014	BDH403
Linden's slipping sanity forces her to suggest to Holder that they turn themselves in. He mentions Caroline's pregnancy as something he will never lose and suggests Linden move on. When Knopf tells Rayne about Katrina's visit to Kyle, Rayne tries to get Linden involved. Linden then questions Katrina, who gives more insight on the Stansburys and admits to staying in the family beach house the night of the murders. Linden then takes Kyle back to the family home to jog his memory of what happened. He admits to hating his father enough to kill him but doesn't confess to anything. The detectives discover that Kyle's mother, Linda, had been fired from her teaching job for having an affair with Knopf. Holder becomes unnerved when Reddick learns he asked Skinner's wife about the lake house. Reddick even calls him and Linden in when Bethany receives a text from her father. Holder knows Linden still has Skinner's phone. He nearly confesses to the group at his Narcotics Anonymous meeting, where Reddick has an informant. Linden goes to the lake and dumps the phone, as Skinner's wife watches nearby.
42	4	"Dream Baby Dream"	Gregory Middleton	Sean Whitesell	August 1, 2014	BDH404
The detectives question Knopf, who admits to having a gun at his parents' house. However, Holder gets so rude with the mother that she threatens to file a report. Linden asks Holder if he is abusing drugs. At the academy, Kyle must bear a form of initiation from Knopf and his superior, AJ Fielding. At home, Linden finds that her social worker and mother figure, Regi Darnell, has already cooked dinner, although Linden had made previous plans with her son, Jack. Feeling out of control, Linden argues with Regi. Holder later apologizes to Linden. They question Kyle about an injury his mother once received. He replies he broke her wrist when she wanted to become sexual with him. Rayne breaks up the questioning, and the detectives spot a car matching one that had frequented the Stansbury home and was up the road from it on the night of the murders; the car belongs to Rayne. Kyle keeps finding a map of his home with Xs drawn on it and gun. A note is attached, telling him to "Finish what [he] started." Reddick gathers all the clues that lead him to the lake. Holder calls Linden to also get her there. Red bags containing bodies, and Skinner's car, are being pulled from the lake.
43	5	"Truth Asunder"	Coky Giedroyc	Dan Nowak	August 1, 2014	BDH405
As Skinner's body is being looked over, Linden, believing Reddick only has circumstantial evidence, coaches Holder to stay strong and on the same page as her. Holder then sees Kallie Leeds' body in the morgue. Reddick offers his theory to Linden, to which she says he hasn't arrested her yet. He mentions that he dredged the lake because Holder confessed at the NA meeting. At the academy, Knopf tells Kyle to search Fielding's room. There, he finds a map similar to those being left for him. Rayne gives her alibi for the night of the murders, and Linden talks with her about the deaths of a man and his son that led to Rayne's military discharge. Linden visits her mother to ask if she will take care of Jack should something happen to her. They reminisce about Linden's childhood before she was placed in foster care and achieve a form of reconciliation. Linden then sends Jack on an airplane to live with his father. Reddick offers Holder a deal, by saying Linden was spotted at the lake, which led to the dredging. At the academy, Kyle notices similarities for Family Day preparations with the night of the murders. He mentions this to Knopf, who, in turn, tells Fielding at Rayne's house. The three plot to learn all that Kyle remembers. The cadets begin a hazing ritual but Kyle flees, seeking help from Rayne. Realising that she could be a part of it, he flees again, while being shot at by the cadets.
44	6	"Eden"	Jonathan Demme	Veena Sud	August 1, 2014	BDH406
Holder tells Caroline that he must make a choice – "between me or her." She knows he means Linden and says only their unborn daughter matters now. Linden gets called and finds Kyle, who's been shot by the cadet search party. He identifies Fielding, Knopf, and Rayne as the murderers. Meanwhile, Knopf suggests killing Rayne, but she mentions cleaning up after them when they stole her car the night of the murders. As the detectives arrive, Knopf and Fielding are shot. Rayne confesses to murdering the Stansbury family, insisting that Kyle be left alone leading Linden to infer that Kyle is in fact Rayne's son who she gave away 17 years previously. Linden wants to use Rayne's confession and arrest her for all the murders, but Holder wants Kyle for the Stansburys'. Frantic, Linden points her gun at Holder, thinking he has worked against her, even with Reddick's investigation. She takes Kyle to his family home, where he becomes aware of committing the murders. Fielding and Knopf were there that night, but left, and Kyle killed his family. At the station, Linden confesses having killed Skinner to Reddick and absolves Holder. Mayor Darren Richmond arrives to squelch the confession. Skinner's death was ruled a suicide, and no killer cop shall tarnish another cop's or Richmond's image. Five years later: Holder and Caroline are divorced, with joint custody of their daughter, Kalia. Linden has been traveling, now that Jack is in college. She apologizes to Holder for not believing in him, as he was her one true friend. She calls Seattle a "city of the dead", intent on leaving it. He hugs her to try to get her to stay with him, but she drives away. However, she later returns to him.

== Development and production ==
AMC, the network which broadcast the first three seasons, canceled the series after its second season, and revived it for a third, ultimately cancelling it again after the third season in September 2013. However, in November 2013, Netflix, partnering with Fox Television Studios (the production company for The Killing), announced it had picked up the series for a fourth and final season consisting of six episodes. Series developer and executive producer Veena Sud returned as showrunner, with Dawn Prestwich and Nicole Yorkin returning as writers and executive producers. Because they are airing on Netflix, episodes in the fourth season have a longer running time of approximately 55–59 minutes compared to 43 minutes when the series aired on AMC with commercials, and characters are able to use stronger profanity.

=== Casting ===
Cast members Mireille Enos and Joel Kinnaman return as detectives Sarah Linden and Stephen Holder, respectively. New series regulars for the fourth season include Joan Allen as Margaret Rayne, the head of an all-boys military academy. In February 2014, Sterling Beaumon, Levi Meaden, and Tyler Ross were cast as Lincoln Knopf, AJ Fielding, and Cameron Stanton (later changed to Kyle Stansbury), respectively; playing teens connected to the military academy. Gregg Henry, who had a recurring role in the third season as Detective Carl Reddick, was promoted to series regular for the fourth season. The season also introduces Sarah Linden's mother, played by Frances Fisher, who abandoned her daughter when Sarah was young. Having written to Veena Sud at the end of season three praising her for a well-written and superbly acted show, artist Patti Smith was invited to come and watch the filming for the beginning of season four, and when she arrived was offered a cameo role as neurologist Ann Morrison in the first episode.

=== Promotional video ===
In July 2014, an official 90-second trailer was released showing detectives Linden and Holder attempting to cover up Linden's killing Skinner at the end of the previous season as well as glimpses of a new case at the military academy.

== Critical reception ==
The fourth season scored 53 out of 100 on Metacritic based on 14 critics, indicating "mixed or average" reviews. The review aggregator website Rotten Tomatoes reported a 44% critics rating with an average rating of 6.5/10 based on 18 reviews. The website consensus reads: "While its characters still intrigue and its atmosphere remains absorbingly dark, The Killing succumbs to silliness in its fourth season, straying into distractingly overwrought territory".

== Home media releases ==
The fourth season of The Killing was released on DVD on August 4, 2015, exclusively through Amazon's CreateSpace manufacture-on-demand program.
