= Arthur Newman (film) =

2012 film by Dante Ariola

- Theatrical release poster
- Directed by: Dante Ariola
- Written by: Becky Johnston
- Produced by: Mac Cappuccino; Becky Johnston; Brian Oliver; Alisa Tager
- Starring: Colin Firth; Emily Blunt; Anne Heche
- Cinematography: Eduard Grau
- Edited by: Olivier Bugge Coutté
- Music by: Nick Urata
- Production companies: Vertebra Films; Cross Creek Pictures
- Distributed by: Cinedigm Entertainment (United States); Focus Features International (international)
- Release dates: September 10, 2012 (TIFF); April 26, 2013 (United States)
- Running time: 93 minutes
- Country: United States
- Language: English
- Box office: $207,853

Arthur Newman (known as Arthur & Mike in the United Kingdom) is a 2012 American comedy-drama film directed by Dante Ariola and starring Colin Firth and Emily Blunt. Written by Becky Johnston, the film is about a former professional golfer who fakes his own death and assumes a new identity in order to escape his life of failure. On his way to a new job in the Midwest, he is joined by a troubled young woman who is also trying to escape from her past. The film was released theatrically in the United States on April 26, 2013.

== Plot ==
Former pro golfer Wallace Avery is struggling with depression and a life from which he longs to escape. Trapped in an unfulfilling FedEx floor manager job in Florida, he finds little comfort in his failed first marriage or his current relationship with his girlfriend Mina. He is estranged from his teenage son Kevin, who has come to resent him. Wallace decides that he needs a new life.

Faking his own death by drowning, he acquires a forged passport and a new identity—that of a golf pro named "Arthur Newman". "Arthur" heads out for Terre Haute, Indiana to start a new job as a resident golf pro at a club. Along the way, he meets Charlotte Fitzgerald, a troubled young thief slumped beside his motel swimming pool from a near-lethal dose of morphine-infused cough syrup. Charlotte is also traveling under a false identity – that of her twin sister who has paranoid schizophrenia, Michaela, nicknamed "Mike" – and has fled her home in North Carolina.

Arthur and Mike become traveling companions and eventual lovers on their way to Indiana. Mike thinks up a game in which they spot interesting-looking couples, break into their homes, dress up in their clothes and pretend to be them. Unbeknownst to Arthur, Mike collects a souvenir from each house.

Kevin initiates an unlikely friendship with Mina. Together they struggle to understand the man who skipped out of their lives.

While Arthur has fallen in love with Mike, they have only had sex when in the identities they have undertaken during each game. As Mike and Arthur, they sleep in separate beds, but they have highly personal conversations as their true selves – Charlotte and Wallace.

Before they reach Terre Haute, Arthur asks Mike to stay there with him as they live their new lives together. Mike is distressed over Arthur's proposal, later revealing that she is afraid of ending up like her sister and mother, who both have paranoid-schizophrenia. Arthur then comforts her.

Mike and Arthur dress up as they reach Terre Haute Country Club to meet owner Chuck Willoughby. Chuck begins praising Arthur's golf skills, but looking for details online, he realizes there is no golf pro named "Arthur Newman". Chuck threatens to call the cops, but then laughs it off and walks away.

The next morning, Arthur awakes to find that Mike, and all his money, are gone. He decides not to vacate the room because he has nothing to look forward to. Police soon arrive, inviting him to the police station because Mike was caught. The police informs Arthur that Mike had confessed to stealing his money and ask Arthur whether he would like to press charges. Arthur lies and tells the police that he gave the money to Mike and that he has deep feelings for her. The policeman informs him that she's a kleptomaniac and shows him the various stolen items. Including “Beauregard Tully’s” wallet. Arthur recognizes the photo as of the man he tried to resuscitate while Mike held his hand as he died. Arthur bails Mike out but secretly keeps Beauregard's wallet. The police release Mike to Arthur's care.

Outside the police station, the two reminisce about the John Doe who convulsed and died at the bus station where Arthur first tried to send Mike away. The wallet that Arthur has taken from the police is of Beauregard Tully, a truck driver who lives in Newport News, Virginia, with his wife, Rosita, and their two sons. Arthur says to Mike that he had followed her into people's houses, wore their clothes, slept in their beds but never tried to cancel someone's life, as she had done by stealing the dead man's wallet, thus disabling his identification upon death.

Arthur and Mike drive to Virginia to inform Rosita and to return Beauregard's belongings.

The role-playing games lose their appeal, revealing that Arthur and Mike are two hearts that have been hurt by life's challenges. They take a deeper look at themselves and the lives they've left behind. Arthur decides to return home to reconnect with his son, and helps Mike realize that she should return to her sister.

The morning after, Wallace drives Charlotte to her hometown, so she can look after her twin sister. Wallace assures Charlotte that he knows where he can find her, then drives off to return to his hometown to reconnect with his son.

The film ends with Charlotte meeting her sister, the real Michaela, and Wallace appearing at his son's house.

== Cast ==
- Colin Firth as Wallace Avery
- Emily Blunt as Mike
- Anne Heche as Mina Crawley
- M. Emmet Walsh as Zazek
- David Andrews as Chuck Willoughby
- Kristen Lehman as Mary Alice Wells
- Lucas Hedges as Kevin Avery
- Sterling Beaumon as Grant Wells

== Production ==
Filming took place in 2011 in North Carolina, including Raleigh, Durham, Graham, Wilmington, and Fairmont.

== Reception ==
The film received mixed reviews. On the review aggregator website Rotten Tomatoes, the film holds an approval rating of 18% based on 49 reviews, with an average rating of 4.8/10. The website's critics consensus reads, "Despite the natural charisma of its leads, Arthur Newman does little with its intriguing setup, and the result is bland and unconvincing." Metacritic, which uses a weighted average, assigned the film a score of 42 out of 100, based on 23 critics, indicating "mixed or average" reviews.
