= Blood rain (disambiguation) =

Blood rain is a phenomenon where blood is perceived to fall from the sky in the form of rain.

Blood Rain may also refer to:

- Blood Rain (film), a 2005 thriller film
- Blood Rain (novel), a 1999 crime novel
- Stellar Blade: Blood Rain, a video game

== See also ==
- BloodRayne, a 2002 video game and subsequent series
- "Raining Blood", a song from the 1986 Slayer album Reign in Blood
- Blood Reign: Curse of the Yoma, a Japanese manga by Kei Kusunoki
- Red Rain (disambiguation)
