= Eye Candy (TV series) =

2015 American thriller drama television series

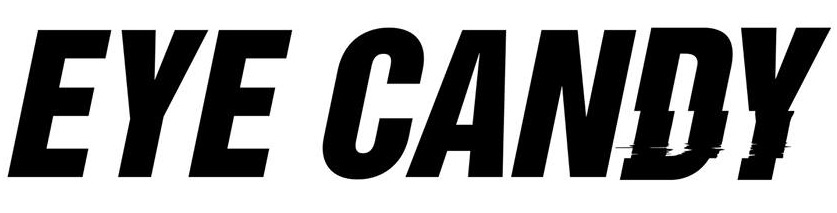
- Genre: Crime; Drama; Thriller
- Based on: Eye Candy by R. L. Stine
- Developed by: Christian Taylor
- Starring: Victoria Justice; Casey Deidrick; Harvey Guillén; Kiersey Clemons; John Garet Stoker
- Country of origin: United States
- Original language: English
- No. of seasons: 1
- No. of episodes: 10

Production
- Executive producers: Jason Blum; Yvonne Bernard; Christian Taylor; Beth Elise Hawk
- Running time: 39–42 minutes
- Production companies: Blumhouse Television; Jax Media; MTV Production Development

Original release
- Network: MTV
- Release: January 12 – March 16, 2015

Eye Candy is an American thriller television series that premiered on MTV on January 12, 2015. The series was developed by Christian Taylor, and is based on the 2004 novel of the same name by R. L. Stine. Eye Candy stars Victoria Justice as Lindy Sampson, a tech genius who goes on the hunt for a serial killer in New York while searching for her lost sister Sara. On February 11, 2014, Eye Candy was picked up for a 10-episode first season. Justice revealed on April 18, 2015, that the series had been cancelled.

== Premise ==
Eye Candy centers on tech genius Lindy (Victoria Justice), a 21-year-old woman who is persuaded by her roommate, Sophia (Kiersey Clemons), to begin online dating. Unfortunately, she begins to suspect that one of her suitors might be a deadly cyber stalker. She teams up with her friends, a band of hackers, to solve the murders he committed, while unleashing her own style of justice on the streets of New York City in an attempt to find her sister, Sara (Jordyn DiNatale), who was kidnapped three years earlier by an unknown suspect.

== Cast and characters ==
=== Main ===
- Victoria Justice as Lindy Sampson, a 21-year-old hacker, who dropped out of MIT after her sister was kidnapped, and is set on finding the Flirtual killer
- Casey Deidrick as Tommy Calligan, an officer at the NYPD
- Harvey Guillén as George Reyes, Lindy's coworker, close friend, and confidant
- Kiersey Clemons as Sophia, Lindy's roommate and best friend
- John Garet Stoker as Connor, Sophia's best friend and Lindy's frenemy

=== Recurring ===
- Ryan Cooper as Jake Bolin, one of Lindy's love interests
- Melanie Nicholls-King as Sgt. Catherine Shaw, the head of the Cyber Crimes Unit of the NYPD
- Eric Sheffer Stevens as Hamish Stone
- Marcus Callender as Detective Yeager, Detective Calligan's partner
- Rachel Kenney as Detective Pascal
- Theodora Miranne as Tessa
- Nils Lawton as Reiss

=== Guest stars ===
- Daniel Lissing as Ben, Tommy's former partner in the Cyber Crimes Unit, who fell in love with Lindy. He was murdered by the Flirtual killer.
- Jordyn DiNatale as Sara Sampson, Lindy's sister, who was allegedly abducted
- David Carranza as Peter, one of the guys Lindy found on Flirtual, who was murdered by the Flirtual killer
- Peter Mark Kendall as Bubonic, a hacker
- Taylor Rose as Amy Bryant
- Daniel Flaherty as Max Jenner
- Ariane Rinehart as Jessica
- Erica Sweany as Julia Becker
- Ted Sutherland as Jeremy
- Erin Wilhelmi as Erika Williams
- Ebonée Noel as Mary Robertson, Catherine's niece

== Episodes ==
| No. | Title | Directed by | Written by | Original release date | U.S. viewers (millions) |
|---|---|---|---|---|---|
| 1 | "K3U" | Russell Mulcahy | Teleplay by : Christian Taylor and Emmy Grinwis | January 12, 2015 | 0.59 |
Newly paroled Lindy celebrates her new-found freedom with her best friends, who also happen to be a group of Internet hackers just like her. Lindy is set up with an account on an app called Flirtual, with the pseudonym 'Eye Candy', when her friends want her to embrace the start of her new life with someone special, but Lindy later realizes somebody is following her, and discovers a stalker has taken an interest in her online profile. Lindy tries to use her hacking skills to her advantage, but this anonymous person proves stronger and more twisted than she first thought. This stalker is also a serial killer. Lindy and her friends decide to band together to stop the serial killer from striking again, while also searching for Lindy's long-missing sister Sara on the streets of New York City.
| 2 | "BRB" | Russell Mulcahy | Teleplay by : Christian Taylor | January 19, 2015 | 0.63 |
Reeling from a tragic murder, Lindy is determined to find the killer by going on dates with two suspects, but as she begins to let new people into her life, she puts her friends and herself on a dangerous killer's radar.
| 3 | "HBTU" | Scott Speer | Teleplay by : Meredith Glynn | January 26, 2015 | 0.52 |
After a fresh abduction, Lindy's obsession with finding the killer grows. Her worlds collide when Sophia throws a party while Jake starts to develop a crush on Lindy, though he has emerged as the lead suspect in the case.
| 4 | "YOLO" | Scott Speer | Teleplay by : Deanna Kizis | February 2, 2015 | 0.60 |
Lindy investigates the disappearance of five teens using her gift for deciphering clues hidden in social media. Lindy and Tommy are led to an unexpected place, and to her new relationship with the Cyber Crimes Unit.
| 5 | "IRL" | Nathan Hope | Teleplay by : Robert Port | February 9, 2015 | 0.62 |
The Cyber Crimes Unit officers and Lindy Sampson must put an end to the killer, while a party in Sophia's club may blow up, resulting in loss of the lives of innocent people.
| 6 | "ICU" | Nathan Hope | Emmy Grinwis | February 16, 2015 | 0.71 |
Lindy helps Tommy to stop a hacker who is messing with a hospital, off the books, but to do so, she needs to become a patient.
| 7 | "SOS" | David Platt | Adam Lash & Cori Uchida | February 23, 2015 | 0.60 |
A couple is attacked in an apartment they rented online, and Jake asks Lindy to help him.
| 8 | "AMA" | David Platt | Meredith Glynn | March 2, 2015 | 0.58 |
Lindy is taken back in a series of flashbacks involving Ben, Tommy, and Catherine that reveals shocking secrets.
| 9 | "FYEO" | Martha Mitchell | Emmy Grinwis | March 9, 2015 | 0.53 |
While Jake and Lindy are on their way to find out what happened to her sister, Tommy is on his way to discover the Flirtual killer.
| 10 | "A4U" | Martha Mitchell | Christian Taylor | March 16, 2015 | 0.54 |
Lindy's search for her sister leads her to Hart Island, the burial site for New York's unidentified and unclaimed dead, and to a showdown with the killer that will force her to choose who and what is most important to her. Later in the episode, she finds out her current boyfriend Jake Bolin is the Flirtual killer, and she is kidnapped and held somewhere. Tommy Calligan shows up and attempts to shoot Jake, but Jake says that Lindy is leaving with him and orders him to drop his gun; Lindy does the same. Later, Jake and Lindy are in a bus station, getting ready to go to Lindy's old hometown. When she exposes Jake as the Flirtual killer, he pulls out a gun and tells people to back off. As Jake attempts to run away, Tommy and a few cops show up. Tommy is able to run up to him and tackle him, where they fight; without much of a struggle, Tommy is able to knee him in the face and knock him out, and apprehending him, thus ending the series. Lindy takes the tickets and travels to her hometown, after she texts Tommy to know, to continue her search with a new lead.

== Production and development ==
A pilot episode of Eye Candy was ordered on September 13, 2013, by MTV. The first and unaired pilot of Eye Candy, which starred Victoria Justice, Harvey Guillen, Justin Martin, Lilan Bowden, Nico Tortorella, and Olesya Rulin, was written by Emmy Grinwis and directed by Catherine Hardwicke.

On February 11, 2014, the series was announced as picked up for a 10-episode first season, with the first episode being reshot and all the roles being recast except for those of Justice and Guillen. On September 16, 2014, the cast was extended with Casey Deidrick, Kiersey Clemons, and John Garet Stoker all becoming series regulars.

Production began on September 15, 2014, and ended on December 20, 2014, in Brooklyn, New York City.

== Reception ==
It received mixed reviews. Tim Stack of Entertainment Weekly stated, "While Justice is a winning actress, she's miscast here and not helped by a story line that feels like one of those old USA TV movies that would have starred Shannen Doherty and Rob Estes." Robert Lloyd of the Los Angeles Times said, "The prologue is well-handled, suspenseful and alarming, but much of what follows seems at least a little bit silly or confused." More positively, Adam Smith of the Boston Herald said, "With the suspenseful Eye Candy, we have a pretty good show, especially for teens who get a thrill out of being creeped out." The series' pilot episode holds a score of 54/100 on review aggregating website Metacritic.
