= Red Rain (novel) =

2012 horror novel by R. L. Stine

- First edition cover
- Author: R. L. Stine
- Language: English
- Genre: Horror fiction
- Published: October 9, 2012 (Touchstone Books)
- Publication place: United States
- Media type: Print (hardcover)
- Pages: 384 (first edition)
- ISBN: 1-451-63612-1
- OCLC: 761383824

Red Rain is a 2012 horror novel by R. L. Stine. Published on October 9, 2012, the book is Stine's second adult hardcover horror novel. Stine, who was inspired by the films Village of the Damned, Island of the Damned and Children of the Damned, decided to write the novel for his old audience from the 1990s. Although one reviewer felt that the book was a treat for those who grew up reading books by Stine, others stated it had a predictable conclusion, offered no attempt at characterization, and was too bogged down in detail.

== Plot ==
Intending to write about the small beach town's local flavor and unusual death rituals, Lea Sutter travels to Cape Le Chat Noir for her travel blog. Her plans are shattered when a terrible hurricane decimates the town, killing off most of its inhabitants. The experience shakes Lea, spurring her to take Daniel and Samuel, two twelve-year-old twin orphans, home with her. Lea's decision does not sit well with her husband Mark, who has been experiencing stress over the backlash for his recent child psychology book. He finds Daniel and Samuel to be strange, especially after they demand that his sister Roz move out of the guest house so they can live there. Their strangeness also stands out to Lea and Mark's children Elena and Ira, who find it hard to trust Daniel and Samuel. Lea insists that their behaviors are due to PTSD and enrolls them at the local school. Meanwhile, Daniel and Samuel have begun stealing various objects from people around them as well as using their unusual supernatural powers to intimidate and control the people around them.

Knowing that Mark does not trust them, the twins frame him for multiple murders in the hopes that it will get rid of Mark. The plan initially works, but eventually backfires when Daniel and Samuel take control of many of the local children. With the help of a woman named Martha Swann from Cape Le Chat Noir, Lea realizes that the twins are actually the product of a failed ritual to reanimate the dead in the 1930s. Lea also realizes that she herself was a product of a similar, separate ritual, having died during the hurricane during her visit to Cape Le Chat Noir. Lea manages to stop the twins and save her family, but at the cost of her own existence. The book ends with Mark and his sister Roz looking on in horror as they watch her son Axl use similar powers as Daniel and Samuel, claiming that they taught him a trick.

== Development ==
Stine began writing Red Rain after his adult readers, having grown up reading his Goosebumps and Fear Street books, began asking him to write a book for them. An outline for the novel was approved by Stacy Creamer, the vice president and publisher for Touchstone, and the book took him four months to write. Stine commented that he normally did not have to do research for his children's books, whereas he did for Red Rain and that he found the writing process more challenging than his other books. He also found that he did not come up with the title until he had completed writing, where he usually comes up with the titles first for his children's books. He read content such as Sir James George Frazer's book The Golden Bough and he was inspired by Frazer's assertion that some tribes believed that twins controlled the weather. He was fascinated by the additional knowledge that blood rain was a real phenomenon, often seen as a bad omen by many cultures. Stine also had to perform research on the book's setting, as he had never been to that location. While writing Red Rain, Stine watched Village of the Damned, Island of the Damned and Children of the Damned as inspiration for his book.

== Reception ==
Critical reception for Red Rain was mixed. Several reviewers such as Booklist, Associated Press, Library Journal, and MysteryNet.com largely praised the novel for its story and its "creepy" tone.

Others, however, gave negative reviews, such as io9 and The A.V. Club, the latter calling it "mediocre". Trade reviews for the book were ambivalent, with the Library Journal remarking that "the whole thing is slapdash". Slate's Katy Waldman commented that Red Rain was too controlled and bogged down in detail, and that the novel's dominant tone was "elegiac rather than exciting". The Piece of S**t Book Club gave it 0 out of 10, calling it "an embarrassment" with poor dialogue, thinly drawn characters and long stretches of word repetition.

In contrast, The Huffington Post named Red Rain one of their best books for fall 2012.
