= The Babysitter (novel series) =

Novel series by R. L. Stine

- First edition cover of The Babysitter
- 1. The Babysitter; 2. The Babysitter II; 3. The Babysitter III; 4. The Babysitter IV
- Author: R. L. Stine
- Country: United States
- Language: English
- Genre: Horror novel, young adult novel
- Publisher: Scholastic
- Published: July 1989 – June 1995 (initial publication)
- Media type: Print (paperback and hardcover)
- No. of books: 4

The Babysitter is a novel series by R. L. Stine. The first novel in the series was published in 1989, and it led to establishing Stine as a prominent author in the children's horror genre. The first novel follows a simple premise of a babysitter who finds she is the next in a series of babysitting victims to a crazed killer. Three sequels were published: The Babysitter II in July 1991, The Babysitter III in October 1993 and The Babysitter IV in June 1995.

== The Babysitter ==
=== Plot summary ===
Jenny Jeffers, a sixteen-year-old girl, takes a babysitting job for a child named Donny. While babysitting, she gets menacing phone calls from someone and finds a threatening note in her backpack. She soon figures out that Donny's father, Mr. Hagen, was the one making those calls after finding a stash of newspaper clippings in his closet. Apparently, Donny had a sister when he was younger, but she died in an accident when a previous babysitter wasn't paying attention to her.

After Chuck, Jenny's love interest, comes over while she is babysitting, Mr. Hagen catches them kissing and becomes angry, having told Jenny never to invite over friends while she was babysitting, explaining how his daughter had died due to neglect of the babysitter. Mr. Hagen then offers Jenny a ride home, but she soon finds out that he is actually taking her out to a rock quarry that has been deserted for years. When they get out of the car, Mr. Hagen forces her to move to the edge of the quarry, right beside a deep pit. He tries to push her, but he misses and falls to his inevitable death.

=== Reception ===
It was listed as the 37th most enjoyable book for boys and girls in a 1997 survey on literacy. In their positive review of the novel, Publishers Weekly felt that Stine effectively built suspense and created an intriguing cast of characters.

== The Babysitter II ==
=== Plot summary ===
Jenny Jeffers is going through a period of distress and fear, as she has narrowly survived a murder attempt by Mr. Hagen, the crazed father of a babysitting charge, who tried to push her into an abandoned rock quarry. She begins seeing a psychiatrist, Dr. Schindler, because of continuing nightmares. In Jenny's nightmares, Mr. Hagen rises from the quarry as a zombie to take revenge on Jenny. A different family has contacted her for her babysitting services, but Jenny is worried about going back to babysitting after her frightening experience, and she isn't sure if she should take the job or not. After discussing it with Dr. Schindler, she decides that she should go ahead and take the offer. As she leaves, Dr. Schindler's receptionist, Miss Gurney, compliments Jenny on her shirt.

When Jenny arrives at the residence, Michael and Rena Wexner issue a strange warning about their ten-year-old son, Eli. It seems that he is an egotistical brat with genius intelligence. Jenny is instructed to just try to stay on his good side. After Eli's parents leave, Jenny goes upstairs to Eli's room, where he boasts that he is a genius. He built a computer from a kit, and he even fabricated his own telephone that he's kept secret from his parents. It's hard for Jenny to tell if he's just a boastful brat, or if he's trying to push his limits and see how far he can pester Jenny. Eli enjoys trying to scare Jenny and tricks her into putting her hand into a shoebox with a tarantula inside. Later on, a dead tarantula appears in Jenny's purse, and she blames Eli.

The next morning, Jenny is again babysitting Eli. Before his mother leaves for the day, Jenny explains what happened, and they both go to confront Eli. He denies making any practical joke and seems very insulted and mad. He proves this by showing his tarantula cage. All three tarantulas are present. Jenny is still unsure, so Eli then throws a crying tantrum. Downstairs a few minutes later, Jenny hears a crashing noise from upstairs. She runs up to Eli's room and finds it in complete disarray. Eli, who is near death, is lying on the carpet motionless, staring up blankly, with a puddle of blood under his head. As it turns out, that was a practical joke, too.

The culprit is revealed to be Miss Gurney, Dr. Schlindler's receptionist, who had earlier complimented her on her shirt. Miss Gurney had put the dead tarantula in Jenny's bag. She takes Jenny to the rock quarry where she had nearly been killed. Miss Gurney and Jenny fall to the bottom of the quarry, which is filled with water, and Miss Gurney tries to drown Jenny. Jenny resists but can't escape. Jenny knows she's going to drown, and she begins to faint. Dr. Schindler arrives just in time with the police and her boyfriend, Cal, and Cal saves her. Dr. Schlindler explains that the tapes from Jenny's interview sessions were disappearing, and when he noticed Miss Gurney was gone, he called the police. Miss Gurney was earlier a patient of Schindler's, because of violent jealous outbursts and attacks. Dr. Schlindler coaxes Gurney out of the quarry, and she is apprehended by police on the side of the quarry. Alone, Cal makes a joke about seeing a movie now that everything is over. Jenny says she does not know what is out, and Cal says that a zombie movie is coming out. Jenny says he has a sick sense of humor before kissing him.

== The Babysitter III ==
=== Plot summary ===
Debra Jeffers, the cousin of Jenny Jeffers, now has a babysitting job and invites Jenny to spend the summer with her. Jenny is shaken because this reminds her of the exact problem she was trying to escape. She dismisses it, determined to recover. Later, Debra begins to experience haunting phone calls just like Jenny used to get, and she begins to fear she has brought the terror with her. Debra finds herself being attacked and tries to find out who is after her. Later, it is revealed that Jenny attacked Debra, as Mr. Hagen had taken over her mind completely. Jenny is then taken away to be put in a mental institution.

== The Babysitter IV ==
=== Plot summary ===
After being released from a mental institution, Jenny Jeffers moves to another town and reluctantly accepts a new baby-sitting job next door in an attempt to finally put her dark past behind her by overcoming her fear. When unexplainable events start to happen, she begins to fear her dark past has come back to haunt her. However, it is revealed the entity terrorizing her is one of the twin boys she was sitting and his previous babysitter from ten years prior. Both died mysterious deaths caused by each other and Jenny witnesses their final battle of rage as they disappear into the afterlife.
