= Sterling Beaumon =

American actor

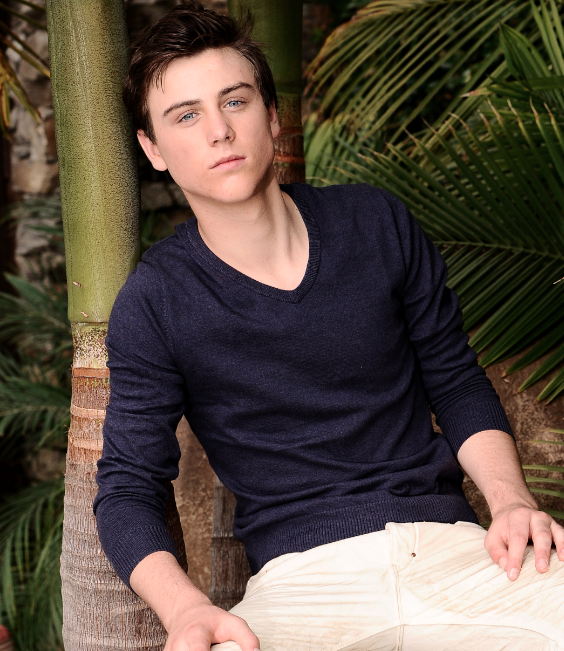
- Beaumon in 2012
- Born: June 2, 1995 (age 31)
- Occupation: Actor
- Years active: 2005–present

Sterling Beaumon is an American actor and producer. He is known for his roles as Max Doyle in the 2008 film, Mostly Ghostly, and as young Benjamin Linus in the ABC television series, Lost. Beaumon has had guest roles in Law & Order: Special Victims Unit, Criminal Minds, CSI: Crime Scene Investigation. He has starred in series such as The Killing and as "Seamus" on the television show Clue, on The Hub channel.

== Career ==
Beaumon guest-starred on an episode of the NBC series, ER, as well as episodes of Bones, Scrubs, Gary Unmarried, Cold Case, and Crossing Jordan. He portrayed the young Benjamin Linus on the hit ABC series Lost.

He also appeared on the CBS series Criminal Minds in an episode entitled "Safe Haven." He followed that with work on the NBC series Law & Order: Special Victims Unit. His mother was portrayed by actress/producer Rita Wilson. He worked with Colin Firth, Emily Blunt, and Anne Heche in the 2012 film Arthur Newman.

Beaumon's voice-over work includes one of the English voices in the Japanese anime series Gunsword and the CGI created Astro Boy film. He was cast as Gabriel Walraven in the ABC series Red Widow. The series aired between March and May 2013. In 2014, he portrayed Lincoln Knopf on the fourth and final season of the Netflix series, The Killing.

== Filmography ==
Films
Year	Title	Role	Note
2005	Left Behind	Ghost Boy	Short film
2006	Oblivion, Nebraska	Freddy Emille	Short film
2007	The Beast	Young Derrik	Short film
2007	Loaded	Little Boy	
2008	Mostly Ghostly	Max Doyle	Direct to video
2008	Four Christmases	Kid in Jump-Jump	
2009	Astro Boy	Sludge	Voice
2009	Spud	Cody	Short film
2010	Astro Boy vs. The Junkyard Pirates	Sludge	
2010	Sheltered	Young Joey	
2012	Arthur Newman	Grant Wells	
2013	Crawlspace	Shane Gates	
2013	The Pretty One	Hunter	
2014	Senior Project	Spencer Grace	
2018	Spinning Man	Matt	
2019	Then & Now	James	Short film
2019	Things That Fall	Alex	Short film
2022	Play Dead	Deputy Farmer	
2023	Your Lucky Day	Cody	

Television
Year	Title	Role	Note
2005	7th Heaven	Kid with Gun	Episode: "Home Run"
2005	House, M. D.	Boy Magician	Episode: "The Mistake"
2006	Gun X Sword	Carossa	English dub
2006	Hellsing Ultimate	Mark	English dub
2007	Crossing Jordan	Stewart Manning	Episode: "Shattered"
2007	Cold Case	Brat #1	Episode: "The Good-Bye Room"
2007	In Case of Emergency	Gerald	Episode: "The Good, The Bad, and The Mob"
2007	Heroes	Crane Boy	Chapter 20: "Five Years Gone"
2007	Scrubs	Josh	Episode: "My Growing Pains"
2007–2009	Lost	Young Ben	Recurring role
2008	ER	Danny Raskin	Episode: "Haunted"
2008	Bones	Royce King	Episode: "The Bone That Blew"
2009	The Cleaner	Miles	Episode: "The Turtle & The Butterfly"
2009	Gary Unmarried	Bradley	Episode: "Gary Has a Dream"
2010	Criminal Minds	Jeremy Sayer	Episode: "Safe Haven"
2011	Law & Order: Special Victims Unit	Hunter Mazelon	Episode: "Delinquent"
2011	Kickin' It	Arthur	Episode: "Dojo Day Afternoon"
2011	Clue	Seamus	Main cast
2011	CSI: Crime Scene Investigation	Drillbit	Episode: "Zippered"
2013	Red Widow	Gabriel Walraven	Main cast (8 episodes)
2014	The Killing	Lincoln Knopf	Season 4 main cast (6 episodes)
2014	Powers	Young Walker	Episode: "Paint It Black"
2015	Backstrom	Ryan Durst	Episode: "Takes One to Know One"
2015	Stalker	Ian	Episode: "Lost and Found"
2016	Longmire	Andrew Price	Episodes: "One Good Memory", "A Fog That Won't Lift"
2017	Law & Order True Crime	Glenn Stevens	Main cast
2019-2020	S.W.A.T.	J.P. Hicks	2 episodes
2020	Shameless	Mack	Episode: "Frances Francis Franny Frank"
