= Mostly Ghostly =

Book series by R. L. Stine

The Mostly Ghostly logo

Mostly Ghostly is a series of books written by children's horror author R. L. Stine. Its target audience is primarily middle school-aged youths ages 11–14. The book series has led to a film series.

== Books ==
- Who Let the Ghosts Out? (2004)
- Have You Met My Ghoulfriend? (2004)
- One Night in Doom House (2005)
- Little Camp of Horrors (2005)
- Ghouls Gone Wild! (2005)
- Let's Get This Party Haunted! (2005)
- Freaks and Shrieks (2005)
- Don't Close Your Eyes! (2006)

== Plot ==
The plot revolves around Max, an 11-year-old boy who ends up having the power to see ghosts. He meets two kids who turned into ghosts and are trying to find their parents. The ghosts make Max a deal: if he can help them find out how they died and what happened to their parents, they will help make his life better, but they usually end up ruining things. Nevertheless, Max still tries to help them solve the mystery, and the three encounter various villains and somewhat silly adventures.

== Characters ==
- Max Doyle is the main character of the series. He is part psychic, because he is the only person in his town that can see ghosts. Aside from being friends with ghosts, he is what most would refer to as a "normal" kid. In the first few books he is 11 years old, but then turns 12. He is very intelligent, but horrible at sports (much to his father's chagrin), and is very unpopular at his middle school. He is subject to frequent taunting.
- Nicky Roland is a ghost boy that lost his ghost-catching parents when Phears escaped ghost prison and turned his family into ghosts and Tara's brother. He did not seem to trust Max in the beginning, but appears to like him in the later books. He is 11 and a half years old.
- Tara Roland is a ghost girl that lost her ghost-catching parents when Phears escaped ghost prison and turned her family into ghosts and Nicky's sister. Like her brother, she is a friendly ghost. She instantly warmed up to Max, unlike her brother. She tries hard to help Max, but usually ends up making things worse. She is 9 years old.
- Colin Doyle is Max's abusive older brother, who frequently picks on him and embarrasses him. He pranks Max every chance he gets. He is very popular, athletic, and muscular, and all the high school girls think he is attractive. His dad thinks that he is a riot when he embarrasses Max. Unlike Max, he does not see ghosts like his parents.
- Mr. & Mrs. Roland are the parents of Nicky and Tara Roland. After they captured Phears, he escaped and turned the Rolands into ghosts. Due to Phears, they are ghosts like their children. In the fourth book, Little Camp of Horrors, they reunite with their children, but leave for their continuous goal of destroying Phears.
- Phears is an evil ghost that was captured by the ghost catchers Mr. and Mrs. Roland. He was angry when he was captured, so he freed himself and the other evil ghosts that the Rolands incarcerated, and turned the Rolands into ghosts. Once he was freed, his only goal was to destroy the Rolands. His purpose is unknown for now.
- Mr. Doyle is Max and Colin's dad. Mr. Doyle always takes Colin's side in arguments because he is proud of his athletic son. He also picks on Max when Colin is not. Unlike Max, he does not see ghosts.
- Mrs. Doyle is Max and Colin's mom. Mrs. Doyle is very allergic to cats. She always takes Max's side in arguments because she does not think bullying is amusing, like any sane parent, but when Max gets in trouble she takes Colin's side (even though most of the time Colin should be the one in trouble). Unlike Max, she does not see ghosts.
- Traci is the "popular" girl at Max's middle school. She is Max's crush, and with the help of Nicky and Tara, Max actually manages to impress her. She has blonde hair.
- Aaron is Max's 12-year-old best friend. He wears swim goggles instead of glasses and does not do homework. Max's parents do not encourage their friendship. Aaron always has something planned.
- Mrs. Murray is the Principal of Max's school and the announcer of his Magic Act.
- Buster is Max's dog who does not do much but is a loyal companion.

== Other media ==
The Mostly Ghostly series has led to three film adaptations:

- Mostly Ghostly: Who Let the Ghosts Out? (2008)
- Mostly Ghostly: Have You Met My Ghoulfriend? (2014)
- Mostly Ghostly: One Night in Doom House (2016)
