= Parachute Publishing =

Publishing company

Parachute Companies
- Type: Private
- Industry: Publishing, Printing, Media
- Founded: 1983
- Founder: Jane Stine & Joan Waricha
- Headquarters: 156 Fifth Avenue; New York 10010 United States,
- Area served: World
- Key people: Joan Waricha (CEO/Chairman); Jane Stine (Co-Chairman); Susan Knopf (Sr VP Marketing); Susan Lurie (Sr VP/Publisher)
- Products: Books, CDs, DVDs, tv series, specialty films
- Services: creates & produces: original fiction (preschool to young adult), nonfiction & book-plus projects; licensed books based on media properties; titles for education market; series for television, products for theme park attractions, videos & DVDs
- Parent: Parachute Properties
- Divisions: Parachute Publishing; Parachute Entertainment; Parachute Consumer Products
- Subsidiaries: Parachute Press
- Website: www.parachutepublishing.com

Parachute Press is a division of Parachute Publishing, a packager of book series for children and teenagers. The four women that are the company's principals are all themselves authors of children's books and other types of books. Co-chairman Jane Stine is married to R. L. Stine. The press first gained notice with the 1989 publication of R. L. Stine's Fear Street series, followed in 1992 by the release of the first of Stine's Goosebumps series.

Since that time the Parachute "umbrella" has expanded, and Parachute Press (as Parachute Publishing) has become a division of Parachute Properties, an "international company that comprises children’s, teen, and adult publishing, entertainment, and consumer products". Most of Parachute's literary products are produced under license for other publishing houses including HarperCollins.

== Titles ==
Parachute still produces series written by its most successful author, R.L. Stine, including Dangerous Girls, Dangerous Girls 2, Mostly Ghostly and Beware! R.L. Stine Picks His Favorite Scary Stories. In 2003 all rights to his most famous series, Goosebumps, were acquired by Scholastic Corporation.

Some of Parachute's other continuing series:

The New Adventures of Mary-Kate & Ashley
You're Invited to Mary-Kate & Ashley's
Mary-Kate and Ashley: Graduation Summer
Mary-Kate & Ashley Starring-In...
Thomas Kinkade: Cape Light and Home Song
Thomas Kinkade: The Girls of Lighthouse Lane
Full House: Dear Michelle
Two of a Kind
So Little Time
The Nightmare Room
Confessions of a Teen Nanny
The Dating Game
The Party Room
