= R. L. Stine =

American writer and producer (born 1943)

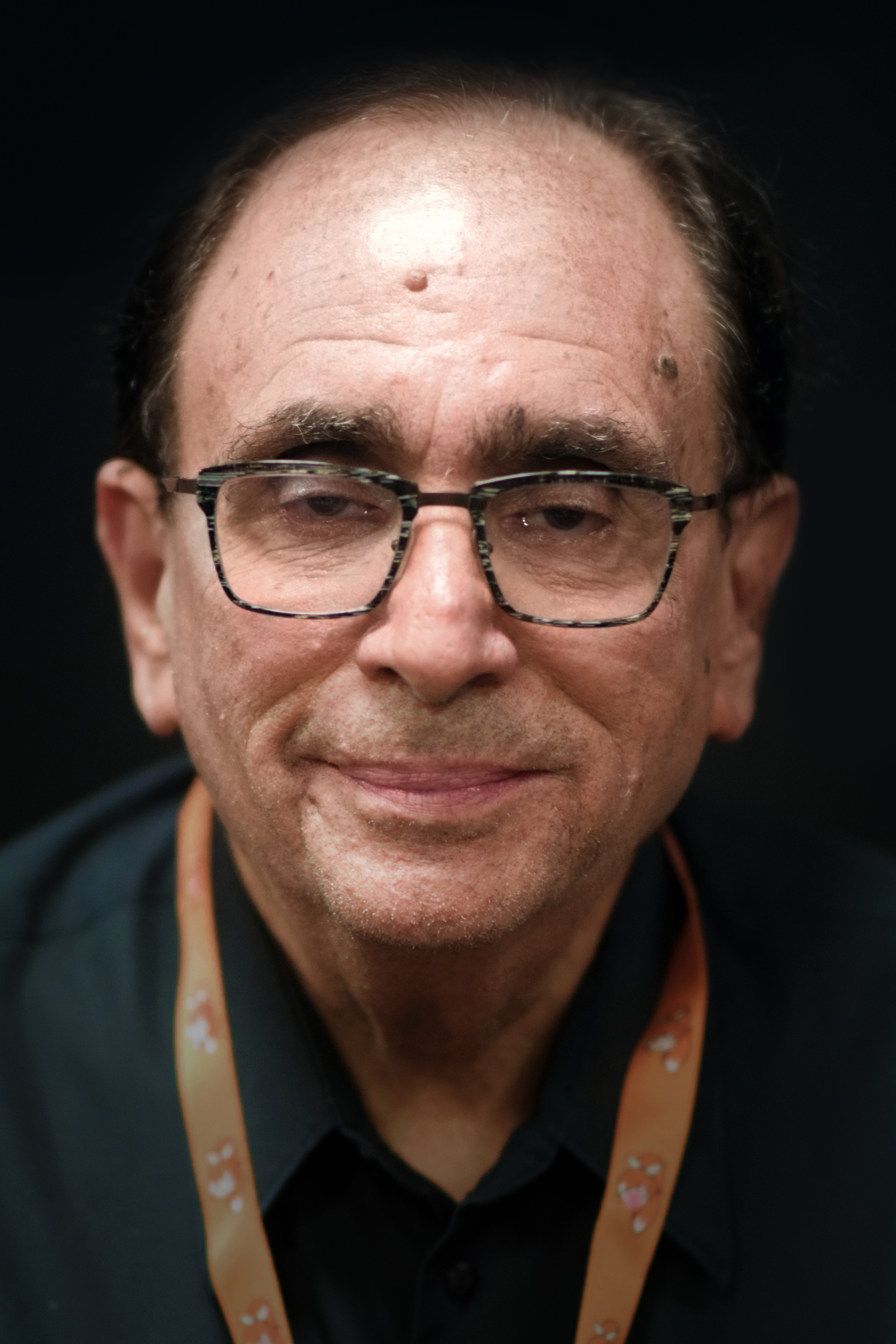
- Stine in October 2022
- Born: Robert Lawrence Stine; October 8, 1943 (age 83); Columbus, Ohio, U.S.
- Education: Ohio State University (BA)
- Occupation: Novelist
- Spouse: Jane Waldhorn (m. 1969)
- Children: 1
- Writing career
- Pen name: Jovial Bob Stine; Eric Affabee
- Genres: Children's literature; horror; science fiction; fantasy; humor; thriller; supernatural fiction
- Website: www.rlstine.com

Robert Lawrence Stine (/staɪn/; born October 8, 1943) is an American novelist. He is the writer of Goosebumps, a horror fiction novel series for children which has sold over 400 million copies globally in 35 languages, becoming the second-best-selling book series in history. The series spawned a media franchise including two television series, a video game series, a comic series, and two feature films. Stine has been referred to as the "Stephen King of children's literature".

Stine wrote the teen horror fiction series Fear Street, which has sold over 80 million copies and has been adapted into a series of films. His work includes Rotten School, Mostly Ghostly, Nightmare Hour, and The Nightmare Room. He has also written humor books for children, under the alias Jovial Bob Stine.

== Early life ==
Stine was born on October 8, 1943 in Columbus, Ohio, into a Jewish family, the son of Lewis Stine, a shipping clerk, and Anne Feinstein. He grew up in Bexley, Ohio.

Stine began writing at age nine, after finding an old typewriter in his family's attic and bringing it to his room to write stories and joke books. After receiving a nicer typewriter as a bar mitzvah gift, he expanded his hobby, spending hours writing and passing around handmade joke magazines at school despite being discouraged by his teachers. Stine said that he remembered reading Ray Bradbury novels and the Tales from the Crypt comic books when he was young and credited them as one of his influences in writing his future works.

Stine graduated from Ohio State University in 1965 with a Bachelor of Arts in English. While at OSU, Stine edited humor magazine The Sundial for three years.

== Career ==
After college in 1967, Stine taught seventh grade at a junior high school in Columbus, Ohio, but quit after just one year, calling it the "worst year of (his) life". Stine then left for New York City, where he attempted to write humor novels for adults, which were often rejected. To support himself, he took freelance writing jobs, including writing for soft drink trade magazines, movie and TV fan magazines, and short stories for a sex and sadism magazine.

In 1968, Stine was hired by Scholastic as an assistant editor of Junior Scholastic Magazine. He went on to write dozens of humor books for children under the name Jovial Bob Stine and created the humor magazine Bananas. Bananas was written for teenagers and published by Scholastic Press for 72 issues between 1975 and 1984, plus various "Yearbooks" and paperback books. Stine was editor and responsible for much of the writing (other contributors included writers Robert Leighton, Suzanne Lord and Jane Samuels and artists Sam Viviano, Samuel B. Whitehead, Bob K. Taylor, Bryan Hendrix, Bill Basso, and Howard Cruse). Recurring features included "Hey – Lighten Up!", "It Never Fails!", "Phone Calls", "Joe" (a comic strip by John Holmstrom), "Phil Fly", "Don't You Wish...", "Doctor Duck", "The Teens of Ferret High", "First Date" (a comic strip by Alyse Newman), and "Ask Doctor Si N. Tific".

In 1986, Stine wrote his first horror novel, called Blind Date. He followed with many other novels, including The Babysitter, Beach House, Hit and Run, and The Girlfriend. He was also the co-creator and head writer for the Nickelodeon children's television series Eureeka's Castle, original episodes of which aired as part of the Nick Jr. programming block during the 1989–1995 seasons.

In 1989, Stine started writing Fear Street books. Before launching the Goosebumps series, Stine authored three humorous science fiction books in the Space Cadets series titled Jerks in Training, Bozos on Patrol, and Losers in Space. In 1992, Stine and Parachute Press went on to launch Goosebumps.

Also produced was a Goosebumps TV series that ran for four seasons from 1995 to 1998 and three video games; Escape from HorrorLand, Attack of the Mutant and Goosebumps HorrorLand. In 1995, Stine's first novel targeted at adults, called Superstitious, was published. He has since published three other adult-oriented novels: The Sitter, Eye Candy, and Red Rain.

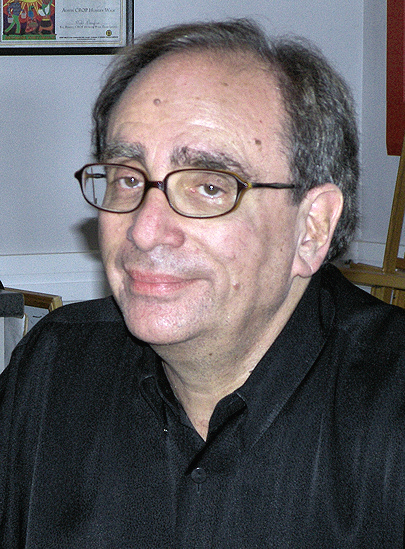
Stine in November 2008

In the first decade of the 21st century, Stine worked on installments of five different book series, Mostly Ghostly, Rotten School, Fear Street, The Nightmare Room, Goosebumps Horrorland and the stand-alone novels Dangerous Girls (2003) and The Taste of Night (2004). Also, a direct-to-DVD movie The Haunting Hour Volume One: Don't Think About It. Starring Emily Osment, the film was released by Universal Home Entertainment on September 4, 2007 and was successful enough to spawn a spin-off, anthology, TV series R. L. Stine's The Haunting Hour.

In 2014, Stine brought the Fear Street books back with his novel Party Games (ISBN 978-1250066220). The release of the Fear Street novel Give Me a K-I-L-L took place in 2017 (ISBN 978-1250058966). Jack Black portrayed a fictionalized version of Stine in the 2015 film Goosebumps, while Stine himself made a cameo appearance in the film, playing a drama teacher named "Mr. Black". In the film's sequel, Goosebumps 2: Haunted Halloween (2018), Stine had another cameo, as Principal Harrison, while Black reprised his role as Stine in several scenes. A Fear Street trilogy of films was released by Netflix in 2021.

In 2019, Stine appeared on an episode of the children's TV series Arthur. In "Fright Night", which aired in the 23rd season of the show, Stine voices Bob Baxter, the uncle of main character Buster Baxter. In the episode, Bob is shown to moonlight as a writer of scary stories, alluding to his real-life career as the author of the Goosebumps series.

On Friday, February 13, 2026, USA Today showcased the first chapter of a new horror novel by Stine, Nightmare on Nightmare Street.

== Awards and recognition ==
According to Forbes List of the 40 best-paid Entertainers of 1996–97, Stine placed 36th with an income of $41 million for the fiscal year. His books have sold over 400 million copies worldwide as of 2008, landing on many bestseller lists. In three consecutive years during the 1990s, USA Today named Stine as America's number one best-selling author.

Among the awards he has received are the 2002 Champion of Reading Award from the Free Public Library of Philadelphia (the award's first year), the Disney Adventures Kids' Choice Award for Best Book-Mystery/Horror (three-time recipient) and the Nickelodeon Kids' Choice Awards (also received three times). In 1995, Stine was listed on People Weekly's "Most Intriguing People" annual list, and in 2003, the Guinness Book of World Records named Stine as the best-selling children's book series author of all time. He won the Thriller Writers of America Silver Bullet Award in 2007, and the Horror Writers Association's Lifetime Achievement Award in 2014. His stories have even inspired R. L. Stine's Haunted Lighthouse, 4D movie-based attractions at SeaWorld (San Antonio and San Diego) and Busch Gardens (Williamsburg and Tampa).

In 2013, Stine won the Bram Stoker Award for Lifetime Achievement. In 2017, Stine was awarded the Inkpot Award.

== Personal life ==
On June 22, 1969, Stine married editor and writer Jane Waldhorn, who co-founded Parachute Press in 1983. Their only child, Matthew (born 1980), works in the music industry. Through Matthew, they have a grandson named Dylan (born 2014).

Stine famously types all of his books using only his left index finger, causing the finger to become curved over the years; he jokingly called it "hideous and totally bent" in 2008. He refuses to learn how to type properly because he believes it would "slow [him] down".

== Works ==
=== Original series ===
==== Goosebumps ====
===== Goosebumps (original series) =====
- Welcome to Dead House (1992)
- Stay Out of the Basement (1992)
- Monster Blood (1992)
- Say Cheese and Die! (1992)
- The Curse of the Mummy's Tomb (1993)
- Let's Get Invisible! (1993)
- Night of the Living Dummy (1993)
- The Girl Who Cried Monster (1993)
- Welcome to Camp Nightmare (1993)
- The Ghost Next Door (1993)
- The Haunted Mask (1993)
- Be Careful What You Wish For (1993)
- Piano Lessons Can Be Murder (1993)
- The Werewolf of Fever Swamp (1993)
- You Can't Scare Me! (1994)
- One Day at HorrorLand (1994)
- Why I'm Afraid of Bees (1994)
- Monster Blood II (1994)
- Deep Trouble (1994)
- The Scarecrow Walks at Midnight (1994)
- Go Eat Worms! (1994)
- Ghost Beach (1994)
- Return of the Mummy (1994)
- Phantom of the Auditorium (1994)
- Attack of the Mutant (1994)
- My Hairiest Adventure (1994)
- A Night in Terror Tower (1995)
- The Cuckoo Clock of Doom (1995)
- Monster Blood III (1995)
- It Came from Beneath the Sink! (1995)
- Night of the Living Dummy II (1995)
- The Barking Ghost (1995)
- The Horror at Camp Jellyjam (1995)
- Revenge of the Lawn Gnomes (1995)
- A Shocker on Shock Street (1995)
- The Haunted Mask II (1995)
- The Headless Ghost (1995)
- The Abominable Snowman of Pasadena (1995)
- How I Got My Shrunken Head (1996)
- Night of the Living Dummy III (1996)
- Bad Hare Day (1996)
- Egg Monsters from Mars (1996)
- The Beast from the East (1996)
- Say Cheese and Die - Again! (1996)
- Ghost Camp (1996)
- How to Kill a Monster (1996)
- Legend of the Lost Legend (1996)
- Attack of the Jack-O'-Lanterns (1996)
- Vampire Breath (1996)
- Calling All Creeps! (1996)
- Beware, the Snowman (1997)
- How I Learned to Fly (1997)
- Chicken, Chicken (1997)
- Don't Go to Sleep! (1997)
- The Blob That Ate Everyone! (1997)
- The Curses of Camp Cold Lake (1997)
- My Best Friend is Invisible (1997)
- Deep Trouble II (1997)
- The Haunted School (1997)
- Werewolf Skin (1997)
- I Live in Your Basement! (1997)
- Monster Blood IV (1997)

===== Tales to Give You Goosebumps Anthologies =====
- Tales to Give You Goosebumps (1994)
- More Tales to Give You Goosebumps (1995)
- Even More Tales to Give You Goosebumps (1996)
- Still More Tales to Give You Goosebumps (1997)
- More and More Tales to Give You Goosebumps (1997)
- More and More and More Tales to Give You Goosebumps (1997)

===== Give Yourself Goosebumps =====
- Escape from the Carnival of Horrors (1995)
- Tick Tock, You're Dead! (1995)
- Trapped in Bat Wing Hall (1995)
- The Deadly Experiments of Dr. Eeek (1996)
- Night in Werewolf Woods (1996)
- Beware of the Purple Peanut Butter (1996)
- Under the Magician's Spell (1996)
- The Curse of the Creeping Coffin (1996)
- The Knight in Screaming Armor (1996)
- Diary of a Mad Mummy (1996)
- Deep in the Jungle of Doom (1996)
- Welcome to the Wicked Wax Museum (1996)
- Scream of the Evil Genie (1997)
- The Creepy Creatures of Professor Shock (1997)
- Please Don't Feed the Vampire! (1997)
- Secret Agent Grandma (1997)
- Little Comic Shop of Horrors (1997)
- Attack of the Beastly Babysitter (1997)
- Escape from Camp Run-For-Your-Life (1997)
- Toy Terror: Batteries Included (1997)
- The Twisted Tale of Tiki Island (1997)
- Return to the Carnival of Horrors (1997)
- Zapped in Space (1997)
- Lost in Stinkeye Swamp (1997)
- Shop Til You Drop...Dead! (1998)
- Alone in Snakebite Canyon (1998)
- Checkout Time at the Dead-End Hotel (1998)
- Night of a Thousand Claws (1998)
- Invaders from the Big Screen (1998)
- You're Plant Food! (1998)
- The Werewolf of Twisted Tree Lodge (1998)
- It's Only a Nightmare (1998)
- It Came from the Internet! (1999)
- Elevator to Nowhere (1999)
- Hocus-Pocus Horror (1999)
- Ship of Ghouls (1999)
- Escape from Horror House (1999)
- Into the Twister of Terror (1999)
- Scary Birthday to You (1999)
- Zombie School (1999)
- Danger Time (2000)
- All-Day Nightmare (2000)

===== Give Yourself Goosebumps: Special Edition =====
- Into the Jaws of Doom (1998)
- Return to Terror Tower (1998)
- Trapped in the Circus of Fear (1998)
- One Night in Payne House (1998)
- The Curse of the Cave Creatures (1999)
- Revenge of the Body Squeezers (1999)
- Trick or...Trapped! (1999)
- Weekend at Poison Lake (1999)

===== Goosebumps Presents =====
- The Girl Who Cried Monster (1996)
- The Cuckoo Clock of Doom (1996)
- Welcome to Camp Nightmare (1996)
- Return of the Mummy (1996)
- Night of the Living Dummy II (1996)
- My Hairiest Adventure (1996)
- The Headless Ghost (1996)
- Be Careful What You Wish For (1997)
- Go Eat Worms! (1997)
- Bad Hare Day (1997)
- Let's Get Invisible! (1997)
- Attack of the Mutant (1997)
- Ghost Beach (1997)
- You Can't Scare Me! (1997)
- Monster Blood (1997)
- Attack of the Jack-o'-Lanterns (1997)
- Calling All Creeps! (1997)
- Revenge of the Lawn Gnomes (1998)
- The Blob That Ate Everyone (1998)

===== Goosebumps Series 2000 =====
- Cry of the Cat (1998)
- Bride of the Living Dummy (1998)
- Creature Teacher (1998)
- Invasion of the Body Squeezers, Part I (1998)
- Invasion of the Body Squeezers, Part II (1998)
- I Am Your Evil Twin (1998)
- Revenge R Us (1998)
- Fright Camp (1998)
- Are You Terrified Yet? (1998)
- Headless Halloween (1998)
- Attack of the Graveyard Ghouls (1998)
- Brain Juice (1998)
- Return to HorrorLand (1999)
- Jekyll and Heidi (1999)
- Scream School (1999)
- The Mummy Walks (1999)
- The Werewolf in the Living Room (1999)
- Horrors of the Black Ring (1999)
- Return to Ghost Camp (1999)
- Be Afraid – Be Very Afraid! (1999)
- The Haunted Car (1999)
- Full Moon Fever (1999)
- Slappy's Nightmare (1999)
- Earth Geeks Must Go! (1999)
- Ghost in the Mirror (2000)

===== Goosebumps HorrorLand =====
- Welcome to HorrorLand: A Survival Guide (2009)
- Revenge of the Living Dummy (2008)
- Creep from the Deep (2008)
- Monster Blood for Breakfast! (2008)
- The Scream of the Haunted Mask (2008)
- Dr. Maniac vs. Robby Schwartz (2008)
- Who's Your Mummy? (2009)
- My Friends Call Me Monster (2009)
- Say Cheese – And Die Screaming! (2009)
- Welcome to Camp Slither (2009)
- Help! We Have Strange Powers! (2009)
- Escape from HorrorLand (2009)
- The Streets of Panic Park (2009)
- When the Ghost Dog Howls (2010)
- Little Shop of Hamsters (2010)
- Heads, You Lose! (2010)
- Weirdo Halloween (2010)
- The Wizard Of Ooze (2010)
- Slappy's New Year! (2010)
- The Horror at Chiller House (2011)

===== Goosebumps HorrorLand: Hall of Horrors =====
- Claws! (2011)
- Night of Giant Everything (2011)
- The Five Masks of Dr. Screem (2011)
- Why I Quit Zombie School (2011)
- Don't Scream! (2011)
- The Birthday Party of No Return (2011)

===== Goosebumps Most Wanted =====
- Planet of the Lawn Gnomes (2012)
- Son of Slappy (2013)
- How I Met My Monster (2013)
- Frankenstein's Dog (2013)
- Dr. Maniac Will See You Now (2013)
- Creature Teacher: The Final Exam (2014)
- A Nightmare on Clown Street (2015)
- Night of the Puppet People (2015)
- Here Comes The Shaggedy (2016)
- Lizard of Oz (2016)

===== Goosebumps Most Wanted: Special Edition =====
- Zombie Halloween (2014)
- The 12 Screams of Christmas (2014)
- Trick or Trap (2015)
- The Haunter (2016)

===== Goosebumps SlappyWorld =====
- Slappy Birthday to You (2017)
- Attack of the Jack! (2017)
- I Am Slappy's Evil Twin (2017)
- Please Do Not Feed The Weirdo (2018)
- Escape From Shudder Mansion (2018)
- The Ghost of Slappy (2018)
- It's Alive! It's Alive! (2019)
- The Dummy Meets The Mummy! (2019)
- Revenge of the Invisible Boy (2019)
- Diary of a Dummy (2020)
- They Call Me the Night Howler (2020)
- My Friend Slappy (2020)
- Monster Blood Is Back (2021)
- Fifth Grade Zombies (2021)
- Judy and the Beast (2021)
- Slappy in Dreamland (2022)
- Haunting with the Stars (2022)
- Slappy Beware! (2022)
- Night of the Squawker (2023)
- Friiight Night (2023)

==== Fear Street ====
1. The New Girl (1989)
2. The Surprise Party (1989)
3. The Overnight (1989)
4. Missing (1990)
5. The Wrong Number (1990)
6. The Sleepwalker (1990)
7. Haunted (1990)
8. Halloween Party (1990)
9. The Stepsister (1990)
10. Ski Weekend (1991)
11. The Fire Game (1991)
12. Lights Out (1991)
13. The Secret Bedroom (1991)
14. The Knife (1991)
15. The Prom Queen (1992)
16. First Date (1992)
17. The Best Friend (1992)
18. The Cheater (1993)
19. Sunburn (1993)
20. The New Boy (1994)
21. The Dare (1994)
22. Bad Dreams (1994)
23. Double Date (1994)
24. The Thrill Club (1994)
25. One Evil Summer (1994)
26. The Mind Reader (1994)
27. Wrong Number 2 (1995)
28. Truth or Dare (1995)
29. Dead End (1995)
30. Final Grade (1995)
31. Switched (1995)
32. College Weekend (1995)
33. The Stepsister 2 (1995)
34. What Holly Heard (1996)
35. The Face (1996)
36. Secret Admirer (1996)
37. The Perfect Date (1996)
38. The Confession (1996)
39. The Boy Next Door (1996)
40. Night Games (1996)
41. Runaway (1997)
42. Killer's Kiss (1997)
43. All-Night Party (1997)
44. The Rich Girl (1997)
45. Cat (1997)
46. Fear Hall: The Beginning (1997)
47. Fear Hall: The Conclusion (1997)
48. Who Killed The Homecoming Queen? (1997)
49. Into The Dark (1997)
50. Best Friend 2 (1997)
51. Trapped (1997)

===== New Fear Street =====
1. The Stepbrother (1998)
2. Camp Out (1998)
3. Scream, Jennifer, Scream! (1998)
4. The Bad Girl (1998)

===== Fear Street Super Chiller =====
1. Party Summer (1991)
2. Silent Night (1991)
3. Goodnight Kiss (1992)
4. Broken Hearts (1993)
5. Silent Night 2 (1993)
6. The Dead Lifeguard (1994)
7. Cheerleaders: The New Evil (1994)
8. Bad Moonlight (1995)
9. The New Year's Party (1995)
10. Goodnight Kiss 2 (1996)
11. Silent Night 3 (1996)
12. High Tide (1997)
13. Cheerleaders: The Evil Lives! (1998)

===== Cheerleaders =====
1. The First Evil (1992)
2. The Second Evil (1992)
3. The Third Evil (1992)
4. The New Evil (1994) *FS: Super Chiller*
5. The Evil Lives! (1998) *FS: Super Chiller*

===== The Fear Street Saga Trilogy =====
1. The Betrayal (1993)
2. The Secret (1993)
3. The Burning (1993)

===== 99 Fear Street: The House of Evil =====
1. The First Horror (1994)
2. The Second Horror (1994)
3. The Third Horror (1994)

===== Cataluna Chronicles =====
1. The Evil Moon (1995)
2. The Dark Secret (1995)
3. The Deadly Fire (1995)

===== Fear Park =====
1. The First Scream (1996)
2. The Loudest Scream (1996)
3. The Last Scream (1996)

===== Fear Street Sagas =====
1. A New Fear (1996)
2. House of Whispers (1996)
3. Forbidden Secrets (1996)
4. The Sign of Fear (1996)
5. The Hidden Evil (1997)
6. Daughters of Silence (1997)
7. Children of Fear (1997)
8. Dance of Death (1997)
9. Heart of the Hunter (1997)
10. The Awakening Evil (1997)
11. Circle of Fire (1998)
12. Chamber of Fear (1998)
13. Faces of Terror (1998)
14. One Last Kiss (1998)
15. Door of Death (1998)
16. The Hand of Power (1999)

===== Fear Street Seniors =====
1. Let's Party (1998)
2. In Too Deep (1998)
3. The Thirst (1998)
4. No Answer (1998)
5. Last Chance (1998)
6. The Gift (1998)
7. Fight Team, Fight (1998)
8. Sweetheart, Evil Heart (1998)
9. Spring Break (1999)
10. Wicked (1999)
11. The Prom Date (1999)
12. Graduation Day (1999)

===== Fear Street Nights =====
1. Moonlight Secrets (2005)
2. Midnight Games (2005)
3. Darkest Dawn (2005)

==== A Fear Street Novel ====
1. Party Games (2014)
2. Don't Stay Up Late (2015)
3. The Lost Girl (2015)
4. Can You Keep a Secret? (2016)
5. The Dead Boyfriend (2016)
6. Give Me a K-I-L-L (2016)

===== Return to Fear Street =====
1. You May Now Kill The Bride (2018)
2. The Wrong Girl (2018)
3. Drop Dead Gorgeous (2018)

===== Ghosts of Fear Street (not written by R.L. Stine) =====
1. Hide and Shriek
2. Who's Been Sleeping in My Grave?
3. The Attack of the Aqua Apes
4. Nightmare in 3-D
5. Stay Away from the Tree House
6. Eye of the Fortuneteller
7. Fright Knight
8. The Ooze
9. Revenge of the Shadow People
10. The Bugman Lives!
11. The Boy Who Ate Fear Street
12. Night of the Werecat
13. How to Be a Vampire
14. Body Switchers from Outer Space
15. Fright Christmas
16. Don't Ever Get Sick at Granny's
17. House of a Thousand Screams
18. Camp Fear Ghouls
19. Three Evil Wishes
20. Spell of the Screaming Jokers
21. The Creature from Club Lagoona
22. Field of Screams
23. Why I'm Not Afraid of Ghosts
24. Monster Dog
25. Halloween Bugs Me!
26. Go to Your Tomb – Right Now!
27. Parents from the 13th Dimension
28. Hide and Shriek II
29. The Tale of the Blue Monkey
30. I Was a Sixth-Grade Zombie
31. Escape of the He-Beast
32. Caution: Aliens at Work
33. Attack of the Vampire Worms
34. Horror Hotel Pt. 1: The Vampire Checks in
35. Horror Hotel Pt. 2: Ghost in the Guest Room
36. The Funhouse of Dr. Freek (Unreleased)

==== Mostly Ghostly ====
- Who Let the Ghosts Out? (2004) (Made into a film in 2008)
- Have You Met My Ghoulfriend? (2004) (Made into a film in 2014)
- One Night in Doom House (2005) (Made into a film in 2016)
- Little Camp of Horrors (2005)
- Ghouls Gone Wild! (2005)
- Let's Get This Party Haunted! (2005)
- Freaks and Shrieks (2005)
- Don't Close Your Eyes! (2006)

==== Rotten School (2005–2008) ====
- The Big Blueberry Barf-Off!
- The Great Smelling Bee
- The Good, the Bad and the Very Slimy
- Lose, Team, Lose!
- Shake, Rattle and Hurl!
- The Heinie Prize
- Dudes, the School is Haunted!
- The Teacher from Heck
- Party Poopers
- The Rottenest Angel
- Punk'd and Skunked
- Battle of the Dum Diddys
- Got Cake?
- Night of the Creepy Things
- Calling All Birdbrains
- Dumb Clucks

==== The Nightmare Room ====
- Don't Forget Me!
- Locker 13
- My Name is Evil
- Liar Liar
- Dear Diary, I'm Dead
- They Call Me Creature
- The Howler
- Shadow Girl
- Camp Nowhere
- Full Moon Halloween
- Scare School
- Visitors

===== The Nightmare Room Thrillogy (2001) =====
- Fear Games
- What Scares You the Most?
- No Survivors

==== Space Cadets ====
- Jerks-in-Training (1991)
- Losers in Space (1991)
- Bozos on Patrol (1992)

==== Hark ====
- The Badlands of Hark (1985)
- The Invaders of Hark (1985)

==== Dangerous Girls ====
- Dangerous Girls (2003)
- The Taste of Night (2003)
- Bitten (2010) (a combination of the prior two books into one)

==== Just Beyond (graphic novel series) ====
- The Scare School (2019)
- The Horror At Happy Landings (2020)
- Welcome To Beast Island (2020)
- Monstrosity (2021)

=== Stand-alone novels ===
- Phone Calls (1990)
- Curtains (1990)
- The Beast (1994)
- The Beast 2 (1995)
- Superstitious (1996) (Stine's first hardcover horror novel)
- It Came From Ohio!: My Life As A Writer (1997)
- Three Faces of Me (2000)
- Zombie Town (2000)
- The Adventures of Shrinkman (2000)
- The 13th Warning (2000)
- My Alien Parents (2000)
- The Sitter (2003)
- Haunted Lighthouse (2003) (based on a 4D movie experience at Sea World)
- Eye Candy (2004) (made into a 2015 TV series on MTV starring Victoria Justice)
- It's the First Day of School...Forever! (2011)
- No Rest For The Dead (2011) (Stine was one of 26 writers in this collaborative mystery novel)
- Red Rain (2013) (Stine's second hardcover horror novel)
- A Midsummer Night's Scream (2014)
- Little Shop Of Monsters (2015) (children's picture book)
- Young Scrooge (2016)
- Mary McScary (2017) (children's picturebook)

=== Anthologies ===
- The Nightmare Hour (2000)
- The Haunting Hour (2002) (made into direct-to-DVD movie in 2007 and a TV series that aired from 2010 to 2014)
- Beware! (2004) (editor)
- Temptation (2012)
- Scream and Scream Again (2018) (editor)
- Stinetinglers (2022)

=== Rainy Night Theater Podcast short stories ===
- "The Head Start" (2016)
- "Welcome To My Nightmare" (2016)
- "Lucky at Cards" (2016)
- "Don't Open The Box" (2016)
- "How To Color A Monster" (2016)
- "The Terror After School" (2017)
- "The Kid Behind the Door" (2017)
- "Curse of the Smiling Mummy" (2017)
- "Can You Keep a Secret?" (2017)
- "Do Some Damage!" (2017)

=== Short stories (from other anthologies) ===
- "The Spell" (1991) from Scary: Stories That Will Make You Scream and 13: Tales of Horror
- "The Surprise Guest" (2002) from Beware!
- "Joe Is Not A Monster" (2002) from Beware!
- "The House Of No Return" (2002) from Scary 2: More Stores That Will Make You Scream
- "Wifey" (2006) from Death Do Us Part
- "My Worst Nightmare" (2009) from Half Minute Horrors
- "The Wrong Room" (2009) from Twilight Zone: 19 Original Stories on the 50th Anniversary
- "Roomful Of Witnesses" (2009) from Thriller 2
- "The Three Eyed Man" (2010) from Bones: Terrifying Tales to Haunt Your Dreams
- "Funny Things" (2011) from What You Wish For: A Book On Darfur
- "High Stakes" (2013) from The Mystery Box
- "Gaslighted" (2015) from Faceoff
- "Disappear!" (2015) from Guys Read: Terrifying Tales
- "The Old Radio" (2016) from Scary Out There
- "The Demon Room" (2019) (comic) from Shock Volume 2
- "The Ghost In Sam's Closet" (2020) from Don't Turn Out The Lights
- "Hope I Don't See A Ghost" (2022) from Hope Wins: A Collection Of Inspiring Stories For Young Readers

=== Books written under the name Jovial Bob Stine ===
- How to Be Funny (1978)
- The Absurdly Silly Encyclopaedia and Fly Swatter (1978)
- Going Out! Going Steady! Going Bananas! (1979)
- Dynamite's Funny Book of the Sad Facts of Life (1980)
- The Sick of Being Sick Book (1980)
- Pigs' Book of World Records (1980)
- Complete Book Of Nerds (1980)
- Gnasty Gnomes (1981)
- Cool Kids' Guide to Summer Camp (1981)
- Don't Stand in the Soup (1982)
- The Great Superman Movie Book (1982)
- Bored Of Being Bored: How To Beat The Boredom Blahs (1982)
- Blips: The First Book of Videogame Funnies (1983)
- Everything You Need To Survive Money Problems (1983)
- Everything You Need To Survive Money Problems (1983)
- Jovial Bob's Computer Joke Book (1985)
- Masters of the Universe: Demons of the Deep (1985)
- The Madballs Handbook (1986)
- 101 Silly Monster Jokes (1986)
- Miami Mice (1986)
- Doggone Dog Joke Book (1987)
- Spaceballs: The Book (1987)
- 101 Wacky Kid Jokes (1988)
- You Know It's Going to Be A Long School Year When... (1988)
- Big Top Pee-wee Movie Storybook (1988)
- Look out! Here Comes The Raisin-Busters (1988)
- Pork and Beans: Play Date (1989)
- My Secret Identity (1989)
- Ghostbusters II Storybook (1989)
- Amazing Adventure of Me, Myself and I (1990)
- The Good News, Bad News Joke Book (1990)
- 101 School Cafeteria Jokes
- 101 Creepy Creatures Jokes
- 101 Vacation Jokes (1990)
- Exploring Humorous Fiction (1992)

=== Books written under the name Zachary Blue ===
- The Protectors #1: The Petrova Twist (1987)
- The Protectors #2: The Jet Fighter Trap (1987)

=== Comic books ===
- Man-Thing (2019)

=== Contributions to other series ===
==== Crosswinds ====
- Crosswinds #21: Broken Date (1988)
- Crosswinds #32: How I Broke Up With Ernie (1990)

==== Twist-a-plot ====
- The Time Raider (1982)
- Golden Sword of Dragonwalk (1983)
- Horrors of the Haunted Museum (1983)
- Instant Millionaire (1984)

==== Find Your Fate ====
- Indiana Jones and the Curse of Horror Island (1984)
- Indiana Jones and the Giants of the Silver Tower (1984)
- Indiana Jones and the Cult of the Mummy's Crypt (1985)
- James Bond in Win, Place or Die (1985)
- Indiana Jones and the Ape Slaves of Howling Island (1986)

==== Find Your Fate Junior: Golden Girl ====
- Golden Girl and the Vanishing Unicorn (1986)

==== Advanced Dungeons And Dragons Storybook ====
- The Forest Of Enchantment

==== Wizards, Warriors and You ====
- The Forest of Twisted Dreams (1984)
- The Siege of the Dragonriders (as Eric Affabee) (1984)
- Challenge of the Wolf Knight (1985)
- The Dragon Queen's Revenge (as Eric Affabee) (1986)
- The Impostor King (1986)
- Cavern of the Phantoms (1986)
- Attack on the King (as Eric Affabee) (1986)

==== G.I. Joe: Find Your Fate ====
- Operation: Star Raider (as Eric Affabee) (1985)
- Operation: Deadly Decoy (1986)
- Operation: Mindbender (1986)
- Serpentor and the Mummy Warrior (1987)

==== G.I. Joe ====
- Siege of Serpentor (1988)
- Jungle Raid (1988)

==== Horror High ====
- Horror High #3: Grave Intentions
- Horror High #4: Fatal Kiss
- Horror High #6: Deadly Rumours

==== Point Horror ====
- Blind Date (1986)
- Twisted (1987)
- The Babysitter (1989)
- Beach Party (1990)
- The Boyfriend (1990)
- The Babysitter II (1991)
- The Girlfriend (1991)
- The Snowman (1991)
- Beach House (1992)
- Hit and Run (1992)
- The Hitchhiker (1992)
- Halloween Night (1993)
- The Babysitter III (1993)
- The Dead Girlfriend (1993)
- Call Waiting (1994)
- Halloween Night II (1994)
- I Saw You That Night! (1994)
- The Babysitter IV (1995)
- Summer Sizzlers (1995) (Point Romance Short Story Anthology)

==== Garbage Pail Kids ====
- Welcome To Smellville (2020)
- Thrills and Chills (2021)
- Camp Daze (2021)

== See also ==
- Dynamite (magazine)
- Weird fiction
