= John Bowne High School =

Public school in New York City

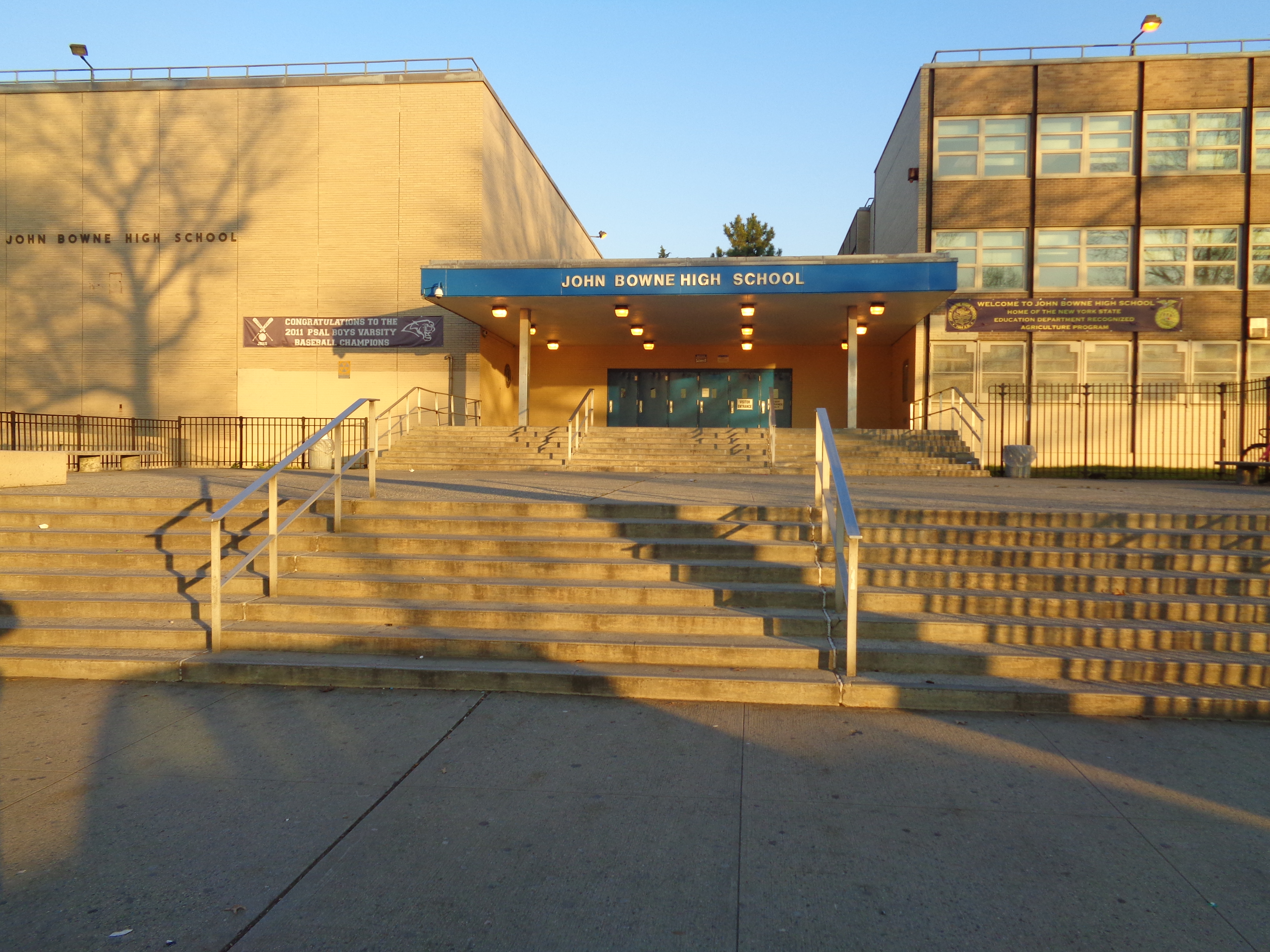

Location
- 63-25 Main St; Flushing, Queens, New York 11367; United States; 40°44′19″N 73°49′26″W

Information
- Type: Public
- Established: 1964
- School district: New York City Department of Education
- NCES School ID: 360012202014
- Principal: Laura Izzo Iannelli
- Teaching staff: 211.66 (on an FTE basis)
- Grades: 9-12
- Enrollment: 3,003 (2022-2023)
- Student to teacher ratio: 14.19
- Campus: City: Large
- Colors: Navy Blue, Gray and White
- Mascot: Wildcats
- Yearbook: Opus
- Website: www.johnbowne.org

John Bowne High School is a public high school located in Flushing, Queens, New York City, next to Queens College, City University of New York. It has an enrollment of nearly four thousand students. The school, which opened in 1964, is named after the Quaker religious freedom fighter John Bowne. John Bowne High School offers multiple programs including a science research program, a law program, a creative arts program, writing program, and an agriculture program.

== Sports ==
John Bowne's male athletic teams consist of: Varsity Baseball and JV Baseball, Varsity Basketball and JV Basketball, Varsity Bowling, Coed Cricket, Cross Country, Coed Golf, Varsity Handball, Indoor Track, Outdoor Track, Varsity Soccer, Varsity Tennis, Varsity Volleyball, and Varsity Wrestling.

John Bowne's female athletic teams consist of: Varsity Basketball, Cross Country, Varsity Handball, Indoor Track, Outdoor Track, Varsity Soccer, Varsity Tennis, Varsity Volleyball, JV Volleyball and Varsity Softball.

In 1994, the John Bowne Men's Varsity Tennis team placed dead last losing all regular season meets. In 1998, the Men's Varsity Tennis team went undefeated during the regular season and went on to win the NYC divisional championship on court at the USTA. Two of the three singles players advanced to the third round at the state level.

In 2011, the Varsity Baseball team won the B City Championship by defeating Van Buren in the finals at MCU Park 2–1.

== Notable students and alumni ==
Notable students and alumni include the following:

- Donna Adelson – convicted murderer
- Jerry Beck – animation historian
- Hamidou Diallo – professional basketball player (transferred to Putnam Science Academy)
- Adele Diamond – Professor of Neuroscience at the University of British Columbia and Tier 1 Canada Research Chair in the field of Developmental Cognitive Neuroscience
- Ehinomen Ehikhamenor – boxer and star on the television show The Contender
- Kevin Kelley – boxer
- Ibram X. Kendi – professor and author of How to Be an Antiracist and Stamped from the Beginning: The Definitive History of Racist Ideas in America
- Founding members of Main Source, a hip hop group
- Robert Marks – vocal coach, music arranger, accompanist, author, and music director
- Steve Ratzer – Major League Baseball player
- Heathcliff Slocumb – Major League Baseball relief pitcher
- Bob Weinstein – film producer and co-founder of Miramax Films and the Weinstein Company
- Harvey Weinstein – film producer and founder of Miramax Films and the Weinstein Company; convicted sex offender in numerous sexual abuse cases
