= Antiracist Baby =

2020 children's book by Ibram X. Kendi

- Author: Ibram X. Kendi
- Illustrator: Ashley Lukashevsky
- Cover artist: Ashley Lukashevsky
- Language: English
- Genre: Children's picture book
- Published: 2020
- Publication place: United States
- Media type: Print (hardback)
- Pages: 24
- ISBN: 978-0-593-11041-6
- OCLC: 1162520080

Antiracist Baby is a 2020 children's book written by Ibram X. Kendi and illustrated by Ashley Lukashevsky. The book, inspired by the author's four-year-old daughter, was conceived as a tool for discussing racism with young children. The book proposes nine steps for discussing racism, with the ultimate goal of teaching children to be antiracist. The book states that "Antiracist Baby is bred not born. Antiracist Baby is raised to make society transform" and that a choice is necessary: "babies are taught to be racist or antiracist—there's no neutrality."

== Background ==
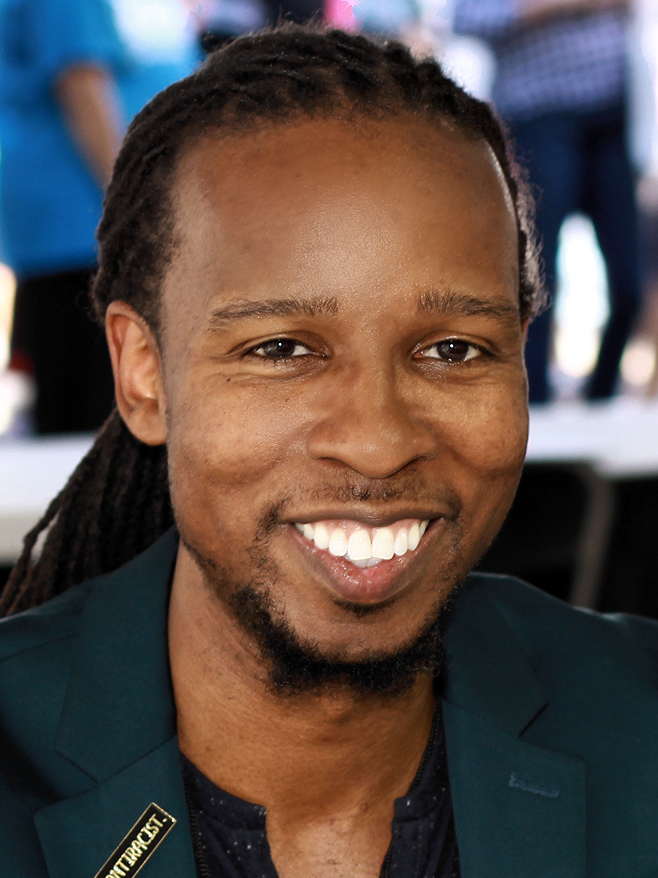
Author Ibram X. Kendi

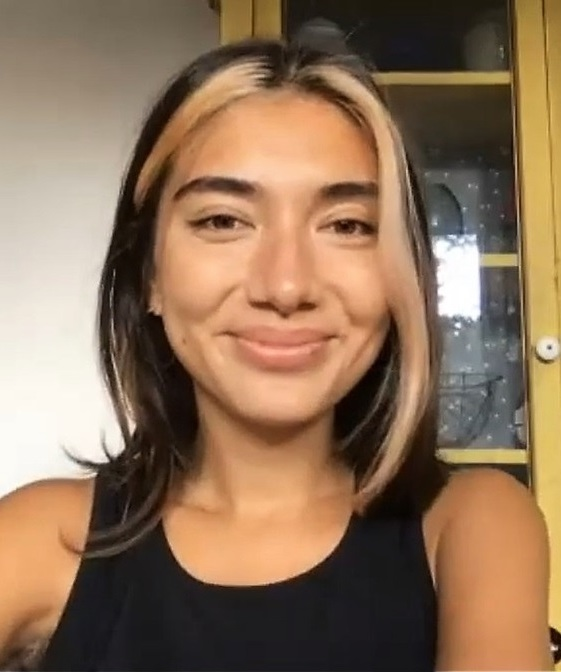
Illustrator Ashley Lukashevsky

Kendi is the founder of the Antiracist Research & Policy Center at American University and was the founding director of the Boston University Center for Antiracist Research until its closure in 2025. Antiracist Baby expands on Kendi's previous books, Stamped from the Beginning and How to Be an Antiracist.

On writing Antiracist Baby, Kendi said that the book would be a useful tool to start a conversation between parents and children on what anti-racism means, and encourage children to ask questions about race.

== Release ==
The book was first released as a board book in June 2020, then as a picture book in July 2020. In 2021 Netflix announced that it would produce a series of "musical animated shorts" based on the book. In May 2022, Netflix announced that the series was scrapped for creative reasons.

== Reception ==
The book was at the top of the New York Times best-seller list and was chosen as one of National Public Radio's 100 favorite books for young readers. It received positive reviews from the School Library Journal and Publishers Weekly. Will Lloyd, writing in The Spectator, rejected its thesis that babies are taught to be either racist or antiracist. In 2021, Safeway grocery stores in Oregon temporarily pulled the book from sale following a customer complaint (the stores later returned the book to sale).

During the 2022 Ketanji Brown Jackson Supreme Court nomination hearing in the Senate, Antiracist Baby was brought up as an issue by Ted Cruz when questioning Ketanji Brown Jackson about her opinions of critical race theory, as she was a board member at Georgetown Day School, a private school in Washington, D.C., that had the book in their curriculum. Jackson replied, "I don't believe that any child should be made to feel as though they are racist or though they are not valued or less than, or victims, oppressors. I don't believe in any of that." This resulted in significant exposure for the book and led to a sudden increase in sales, making it a number one bestseller on Amazon for children's books on prejudice and racism, and among the top-selling children's books across multiple categories.
