= Ibram X. Kendi =

American academic (born 1982)

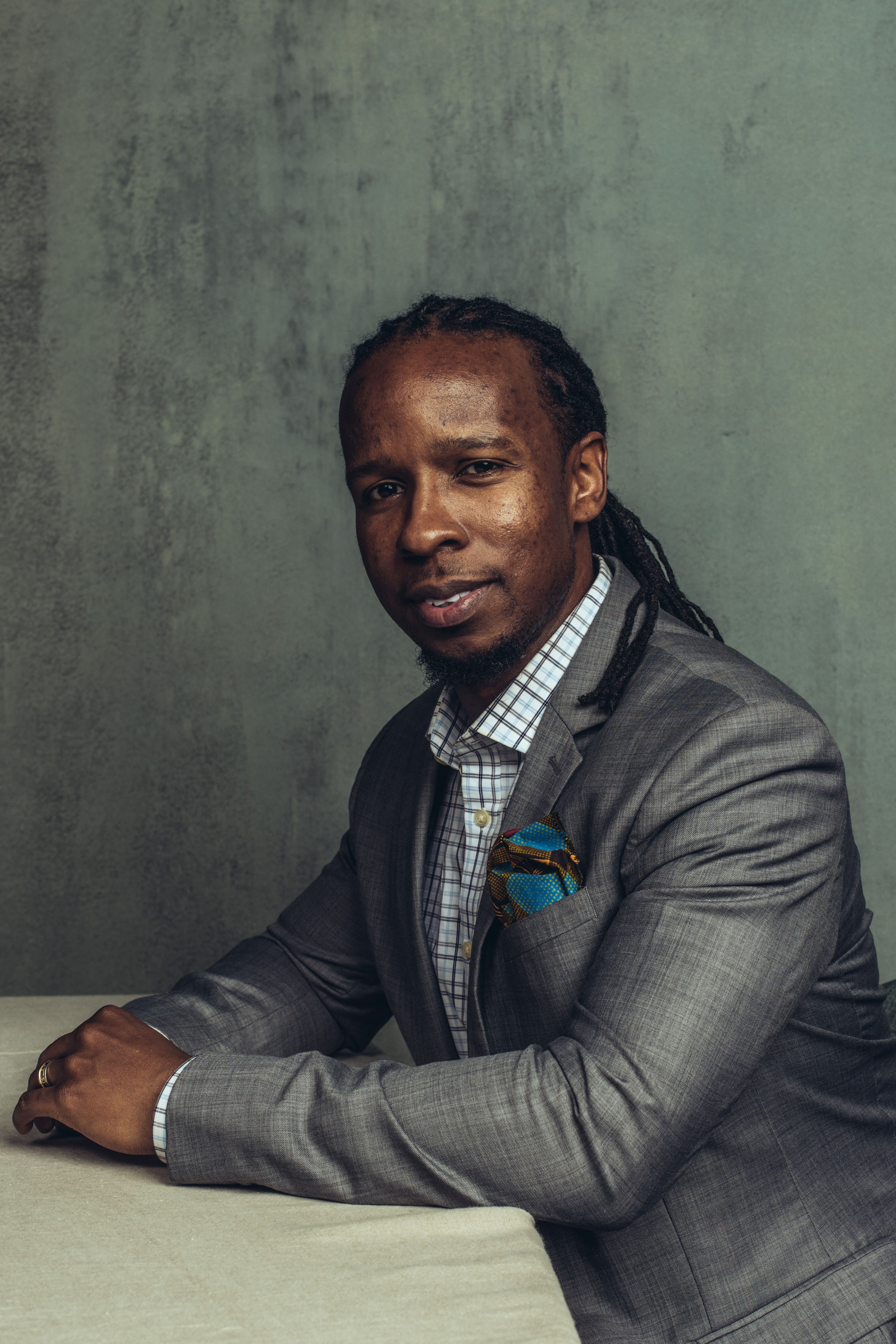
- Kendi in 2021
- Born: Ibram Henry Rogers; August 13, 1982 (age 44); New York City, U.S.
- Spouse: Sadiqa Kendi (m. 2013)

Academic background
- Education: Florida A&M University (BS); Temple University (MA, PhD)
- Thesis: The Black Campus Movement: An Afrocentric Narrative History of the Struggle to Diversify Higher Education, 1965–1972 (2010)
- Doctoral advisor: Ama Mazama

Academic work
- Discipline: African-American studies
- Sub-discipline: African-American history
- Institutions: Howard University; Boston University; American University; University of Florida; University at Albany, SUNY; State University of New York at Oneonta
- Website: Official website

Ibram Xolani Kendi (born Ibram Henry Rogers; August 13, 1982) is an American author, professor, anti-racism activist, and historian of race and discriminatory policy in the U.S. He is author of books including Stamped from the Beginning, How to Be an Antiracist, Antiracist Baby, and Chain of Ideas. He has been interviewed by such figures as Stephen Colbert and Oprah Winfrey, and in 2019, the New York Times referred to him as "one of the country’s most in-demand commentators on racism." Kendi was also included in Time's 100 Most Influential People of 2020.

In July 2020, he founded the Center for Antiracist Research at Boston University where he served as director until 2025. An internal investigation was launched into potential financial mismanagement of the center. Kendi was cleared of financial mismanagement, but the center underwent an audit regarding his leadership and the center's culture. In 2021, Kendi was a recipient of the MacArthur Fellows Program award. In January 2025, Howard University announced that Kendi would join its faculty and lead its newly founded Institute for Advanced Study, created to investigate the African diaspora. In 2026, he was appointed as the inaugural Carter G. Woodson Endowed Chair in History in the College of Arts and Sciences at Howard University.

== Early life and education ==
Kendi was born in the Jamaica neighborhood of the New York City borough of Queens, as Ibram Henry Rogers, to middle-class African-American parents, Carol Rogers, a former business analyst for a health-care organization, and Larry Rogers, a tax accountant and then hospital chaplain. Larry and Carol were both deeply religious and profoundly influenced by black liberation theology. They met as student activists. Both of Kendi's parents are now retired and work as Methodist ministers. He has an older brother, Akil.

From third to eighth grade, Kendi attended private Christian schools in Queens. In 1997, then age 15, Kendi moved with his family to Manassas, Virginia, after having attended John Bowne High School as a freshman. He attended Stonewall Jackson High School, named for Confederate general Thomas J. "Stonewall" Jackson, for his final three years of high school. He graduated in 2000. In 2020, a petition circulated calling for the renaming of the high school. Warren Christian, a direct descendant of Jackson, called for the school to be rechristened in honor of Kendi. The school was instead ultimately renamed for Arthur Reed, a longtime employee.

In 2005, Kendi received dual B.S. degrees in African American studies and magazine production from Florida A&M University. One of his professors, who taught a course on African history, described him as a student who sat at the front of class, participated in lively debate with other students, and was "engaged and attentive." Originally intending to become a sports journalist or news broadcaster, he interned for both The Atlanta Journal-Constitution and The Mobile Register as an undergrad. After these internships, he became more interested in pursuing a career that involved African American studies. He also interned with the Tallahassee Democrat and wrote a weekly column for Florida A&M's student newspaper, The Famuan. His Famuan column was discontinued at the request of the Democrat after he wrote an article claiming European people had invented HIV/AIDS to fight off the "extinction" of their race. According to the Washington Post, Kendi realized in college that "judging white people as a group is as racist as judging black people as a group."

Kendi continued his studies at Temple University where he was advised by Ama Mazama, earning an M.A. in 2007 and a Ph.D. in 2010, both in African American studies. Kendi's dissertation was titled "The Black Campus Movement: An Afrocentric Narrative History of the Struggle to Diversify Higher Education, 1965–1972."

== Career ==
=== Teaching ===
From 2009 to 2012, Kendi was an assistant professor of history in the department of Africana and Latino Studies within the department of history at State University of New York at Oneonta. From 2012 to 2015, Kendi was an assistant professor of Africana Studies in the department of Africana Studies as well as the department of history at University at Albany, SUNY. During this time, from 2013 to 2014, Kendi was a visiting scholar in the department of Africana Studies at Brown University, where he taught courses as a visiting assistant professor in the fall of 2014.

From 2015 to 2017, Kendi was an assistant professor in the history department and African American Studies program at the University of Florida.

In 2017, Kendi became a professor of history and international relations at the College of Arts and Sciences (CAS) and School of International Service (SIS) at American University in Washington, D.C. In September 2017, Kendi founded the Antiracist Research and Policy Center at American University, serving as its executive director. The same night that Kendi publicly introduced the center, someone vandalized American University by posting fliers depicting the Confederate flag with cotton balls stuck to them around campus.

In June 2020, it was announced that Kendi would join Boston University as a professor of history. Upon accepting the position, Kendi agreed to step down from the Antiracist Research and Policy Center at American University and relocate to Boston University, and become the founding director of the Boston University Center for Antiracist Research. When he was hired at Boston University, Kendi was awarded its Andrew W. Mellon Professorship in the Humanities, whose only prior recipient was author, activist, and Holocaust survivor Elie Wiesel.

During the 2020–2021 academic year, Kendi served as the Frances B. Cashin Fellow at the Radcliffe Institute for Advanced Study at Harvard University.

=== Center for Antiracist Research at Boston University ===
In 2020, Kendi founded Boston University's Center for Antiracist Research under a five-year charter. In August 2020, Twitter co-founder Jack Dorsey donated $10 million to the center, and the center continued to receive $43 million in grants and gifts over the next three years.

The center's Racial Data Lab produced the COVID Racial Data Tracker from April 2020 to March 2021, highlighting that Black Americans died at 1.4 times the rate of White Americans during the early months of the COVID-19 pandemic. In 2021, inspired by 19th-century abolitionist newspaper The Emancipator, the center launched a news website called The Emancipator in partnership with Bina Venkataraman of The Boston Globe. In June 2022, the center published essays from 35 Anti-Bigotry Fellows, which provided legal and statistical analysis on various forms of discrimination.

In September 2023, the center reorganized and laid off several of the center's staff, prompting Boston University to open an inquiry "focused on the center's culture and its grant management practices", later expanded "to include the Center's management culture". On September 24, 2023, Stephanie Saul of The New York Times wrote about concerns surrounding the center's management and focus. Saul cited comments made by former staff and faculty members criticizing the center's leadership, productivity, ambitions, and stewardship of grants. During the investigation, Boston University professors attested to the center's issues, with one alleging that the center "was being mismanaged" and another commenting, "I don't know where the money is." Steph Solis of Axios noted that the scandal "cast a shadow" over the center, while Tyler Austin Harper, writing for The Washington Post, characterized Kendi's work at the center as "grift". In November 2023, Boston University announced that its audit had "found no issues with how CAR's finances were handled, showing that its expenditures were appropriately charged to their respective grant and gift accounts." In the same announcement, the university stated that it had hired the management consulting firm Korn Ferry to conduct an audit on the center's workplace culture and Kendi's leadership. Culminating in January 2024, that audit did not lead to punitive action. Rather it led Kendi and Boston University to modify the center's organizational structure.

In January 2025 Kendi was hired by Howard University to serve as director of its new Institute for Advanced Study, focusing on interdisciplinary research of the African diaspora. Following Kendi's departure, Boston University did not renew the charter for the Center for Antiracist Research.

=== Writing ===
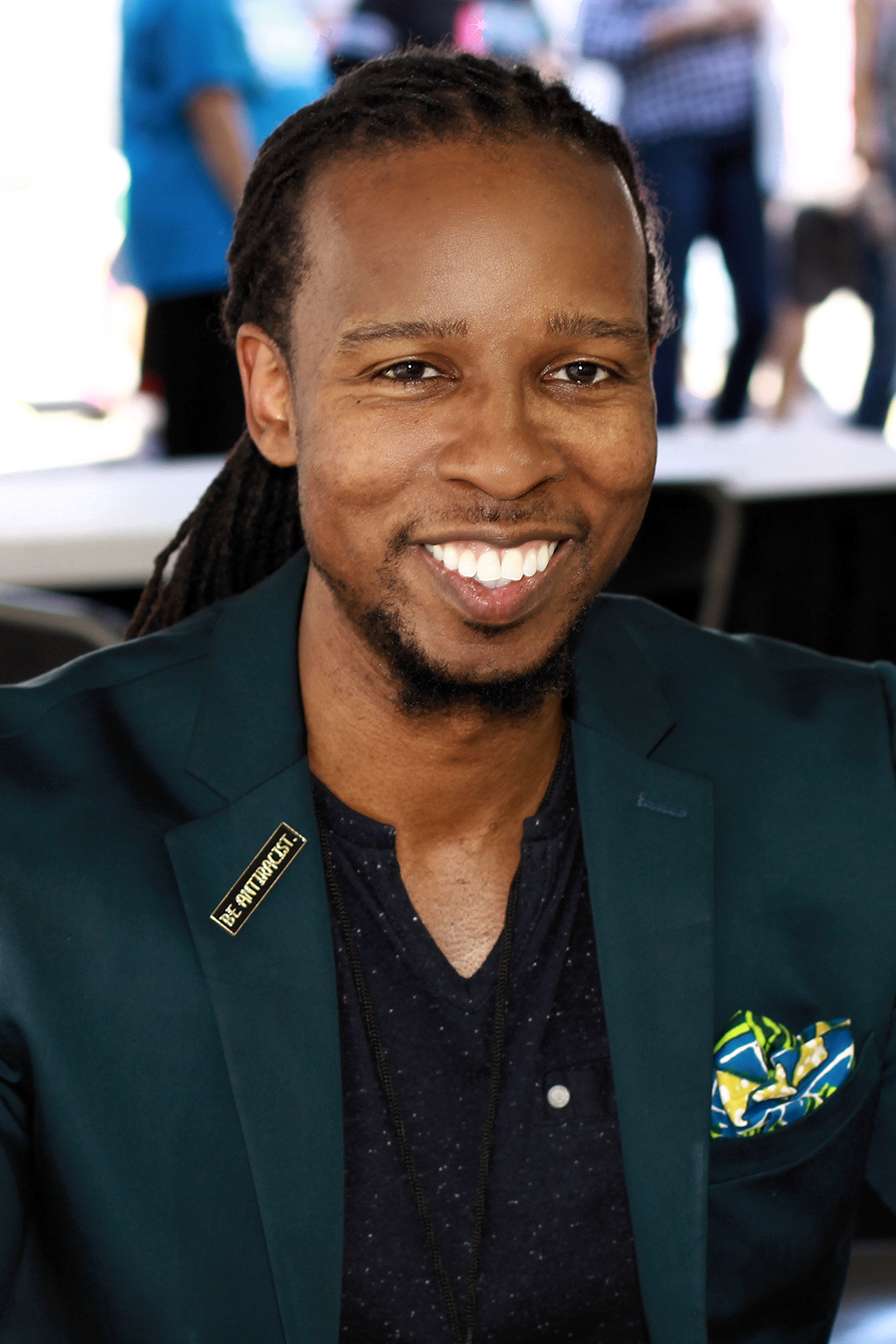
Kendi at the 2019 Texas Book Festival

Kendi has published essays in both books and academic journals, including The Journal of African American History, Journal of Social History, Journal of Black Studies, Journal of African American Studies, and The Sixties: A Journal of History, Politics and Culture. Kendi is also a contributing writer at The Atlantic.

He is the author or co-author of fifteen books, including eight children's books. Some of these are different versions of the same book adapted for younger age groups. Additionally, he contributed to the book Four Hundred Souls: A Community History of African America, 1619–2019, which he also compiled and edited alongside Keisha N. Blain.

Kendi's books include:

- The Black Campus Movement: Black Students and the Racial Reconstitution of Higher Education, 1965–1972
- Stamped from the Beginning: The Definitive History of Racist Ideas in America
- How to Be an Antiracist
- STAMPED: Racism, Antiracism, and You, co-authored with Jason Reynolds
- Stamped (For Kids): Racism, Antiracism, and You, co-authored with Jason Reynolds
- Antiracist Baby, illustrated by Ashley Lukashevsky
- Be Antiracist: A Journal for Awareness, Reflection, and Action
- Goodnight Racism, illustrated by Cbabi Bayoc
- How to Raise an Antiracist
- Magnolia Flower, based on the story by Zora Neale Hurston and illustrated by Loveis Wise
- How To Be a (Young) Anti-Racist, co-authored with Nic Stone
- The (Young) Antiracist’s Workbook, co-authored with Nic Stone
- The Making of Butterflies, based on the story by Zora Neale Hurston, illustrated by Kah Yangni
- Stamped from the Beginning: A Graphic History of Racist Ideas in America, illustrated by Joel Christian Gill
- Barracoon: Adapted for Young Readers, an adaptation of the non-fiction book by Zora Neale Hurston

Kendi has said that his book, Stamped from the Beginning, was initially rejected by more than fifty literary agents. Nevertheless, the book was eventually published in 2016 by Nation Books, and it earned Kendi the National Book Award for Nonfiction that year. He was the youngest author to ever win the prize. Titled after an 1860 speech given by Jefferson Davis at the U.S. Senate, the book builds around the stories of Cotton Mather, Thomas Jefferson, William Lloyd Garrison, W.E.B. Du Bois, and Angela Davis.

==== How to Be an Antiracist ====
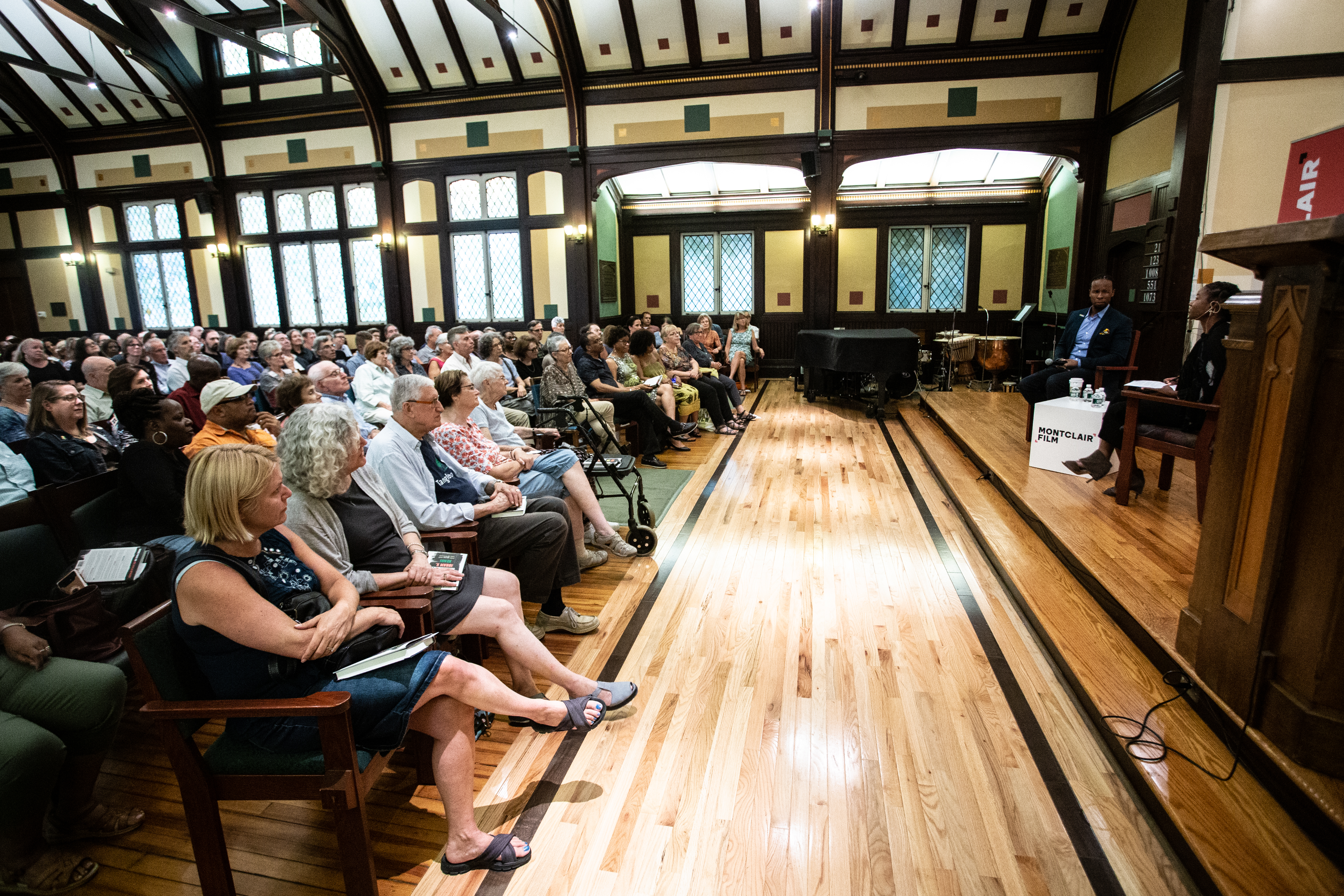
Ibram X. Kendi presenting his book How to Be an Antiracist at Unitarian Universalist Church located in Montclair, New Jersey, on August 14, 2019

A New York Times #1 Best Seller in 2020, How to Be an Antiracist (2019) is Kendi's most popular work to date. The book received starred reviews in Publishers Weekly, Library Journal, and Kirkus Reviews. Publishers Weekly described Kendi's prose as "thoughtful, sincere and polished" and the book's ideas as "boldly articulated" and "historically informed", stating that the book would "spark many conversations". Kirkus Reviews found it to be "not an easy read but an essential one". Library Journal said that "[Kendi's] stories serv[e] as a springboard for potent explorations of race, gender, [and] colorism". A review in Journal of Communication Inquiry said the book "succeeds at fitting into many genres including autobiography, memoir, and even how-to guide" and that it was "commendable" how Kendi presents cultural concepts through stories from his own life. A review in the journal Urban Education described the book as "necessary for all echelons of education". Professor Jeffrey C. Stewart called it the "most courageous book to date on the problem of race in the Western mind". Afua Hirsch praised the book's introspection and wrote that it was relatable in the context of ongoing political events.

In contrast, Andrew Sullivan wrote that the book's arguments were simplistic and criticized Kendi's idea of transferring government oversight to an unelected Department of Antiracism. Kelefa Sanneh noted Kendi's "sacred fervor" in battling racism, but wondered if his definition of racism was so capacious and outcome-dependent as to risk losing its power. John McWhorter criticized the book as being simplistic and challenged Kendi's claim that all racial disparities are necessarily due to racism.

In the book, Kendi develops a theory of racism that draws attention to policy outcomes rather than individual intent. He argues that racial inequity, which is explained as inequalities between racial groups, is the primary indicator of racism, and that policies should be analyzed based on whether they produce equity or inequity. Throughout How to Be an Antiracist, he suggests that racism is a set of structural conditions that are maintained through law, institutional practice, and public policy. This directly combats misinterpretations of racism as simply personal weaknesses and discriminatory ideologies or moral failings.

Kendi’s contributions have been described as foundational for contemporary antiracist discourse, particularly in offering a clear rejection of the category “not racist,” which he critiques on the grounds that passivity sustains unequal systems. He defines for readers a binary analytical framework in which policies and ideas are separated into either racist or antiracist categorizations, which are then measured through outcomes. Within this framework, he contends that discriminatory ideas historically have been used to justify existing inequitable policies, reversing the common assumption that ignorance or hatred precede structural discrimination.

== Honors and awards ==
- 2016: National Book Award for Nonfiction, Stamped from the Beginning: The Definitive History of Racist Ideas in America – National Book Foundation
- 2019: Guggenheim Fellowship, U.S. History – John Simon Guggenheim Memorial Foundation
- 2019: 15th most influential African American between 25 and 45 years old according to The Root 100
- 2020: Frances B. Cashin Fellowship, the Radcliffe Institute for Advanced Study – Harvard University
- 2020: Time 100 list of Most Influential People
- 2021: MacArthur Fellowship
- 2021: Museum of African American History Living Legends award – The Garrison Silver Cup

== Political commentary ==
=== Nature and effects of racism ===
One of Kendi's key ideas is that "racist" is not a term correctly applied to individuals, but rather that it should be used to characterize policies and actions. Further, there is no such thing as "not racist"—only "racist" and "antiracist." He also says that white people suffer due to racism, not only because it leads them to compromise their own morals, but also because it limits pathways to achieving their own freedom in American society. In a 2020 GQ profile, Kendi said, "The elevator pitch to everyday people is that instead of thinking about what you could lose if we were to transform this country—because if you are struggling, you certainly are worried about losing—they should be thinking about what they could gain, especially folks who are low- to moderate-income."

=== Policy changes vs. racism education ===
In his work, Kendi has maintained that "racist policies" against black people such as chattel slavery and redlining do not stem from "racist ideas," but rather the reverse. He contends that, throughout history, people in power institute "racist policies" to protect their own economic self-interests, and then propagate conceptions of racial superiority and inferiority to justify those policies. His framework breaks down racist ideas into two types: segregationist and assimilationist. On the other hand, he also argues that "antiracist ideas" have also been developed to combat racist ideas.

Kendi argues that policy outcomes are central in measuring and effecting racial equity. He has said, "All along we've been trying to change people, when we really need to change policies." When speaking in November 2020 to the Alliance for Early Success, Kendi was asked if that even means abiding racist behavior and attitudes if it leads to winning an antiracist policy. Kendi answered with a definitive yes. "I want things to change for millions of people – millions of children – as opposed to trying to change one individual person."

=== COVID-19 and George Floyd protests ===
On May 27, 2020, Kendi appeared before the United States House Committee on Ways and Means about the disproportionate impact of COVID-19 on African Americans, saying, "This is the racial pandemic within the viral pandemic".

Kendi has criticized police killings. In 2020, speaking to The New York Times after How to Be an Antiracist saw renewed interest during the George Floyd protests, Kendi called the mood in the United States during the protests "a signature, significant distinct moment of people striving to be antiracist".

Before the protests, Kendi published a proposal for a constitutional amendment in the U.S. to establish and fund the Department of Anti-Racism (DOA). This department would be responsible for "preclearing all local, state and federal public policies to ensure they won't yield racial inequity, monitor those policies, investigate and be empowered with disciplinary tools to wield over and against policymakers and public officials who do not voluntarily change their racist policy and ideas".

=== Controversy over remarks about Amy Coney Barrett ===
Amy Coney Barrett, President Donald Trump's third Supreme Court nominee, adopted two children from an orphanage in Haiti. Jenny Beth Martin, the co-founder of the conservative group Tea Party Patriots, tweeted “With 2 adopted children from Haiti, it is going to be interesting to watch Democrats try to smear Amy Coney Barrett as racist.”

In September 2020, Kendi provoked controversy when he tweeted in reply:

Some White colonizers 'adopted' Black children. They 'civilized' these 'savage' children in the 'superior' ways of White people, while using them as props in their lifelong pictures of denial, while cutting the biological parents of these children out of the picture of humanity. And whether this is Barrett or not is not the point. It is a belief too many White people have: if they have or adopt a child of color, then they can't be racist.

His remarks were interpreted as criticizing interracial adoption. A substantial backlash against Kendi ensued. He later said his comments were taken out of context and that he had never said that white parents of black children are inherently racist.

=== Comments on transgender people ===
In a discussion with journalist Don Lemon, Kendi said that he was taught to fear the differences of gay and transgender people until he was "shown another way."

== Personal life ==
In 2013, Kendi married Sadiqa Edmonds, a pediatric emergency medicine physician, in Jamaica. Both sets of parents participated in a symbolic sand ceremony. The wedding ceremony ended with a naming ceremony of their new last name, "Kendi", which means "the loved one" in the language of the Meru people of Kenya. Kendi changed his middle name to Xolani, a Xhosa and Zulu word for "peace". Kendi has said that he decided to drop Henry, the middle name he was given at birth, after learning about the key role that Portuguese explorer Prince Henry the Navigator played in beginning the Atlantic slave trade.

In January 2018, while he was writing How to be an Antiracist, a colonoscopy indicated that Kendi had cancer. A further test revealed that he had stage 4 colon cancer that had spread into his liver. After six months of chemotherapy and surgery that summer, Kendi was declared cancer free.

Kendi has been a vegan since at least 2015.

== Selected works and publications ==
=== Books ===
- 2012. The Black Campus Movement: Black Students and the Racial Reconstitution of Higher Education, 1965-1972. New York: Palgrave Macmillan. ISBN 978-1-137-01650-8. OCLC 795781224.
- 2016. Stamped from the Beginning: The Definitive History of Racist Ideas in America. New York: Nation Books. ISBN 978-1-568-58464-5. OCLC 946615694. Wikidata ()
- 2019. How to Be An Antiracist. New York: One World. ISBN 978-0-525-50929-5. OCLC 1112221532.
- 2020. STAMPED: Racism, Antiracism, and You, with Jason Reynolds. New York: Little, Brown and Company. ISBN 978-0-316-45367-7. OCLC 1140447496.
- 2020. Antiracist Baby, illustrated by Ashley Lukashevsky. New York: Kokila. ISBN 978-0-593-11050-8. OCLC 1143836565.
- 2021. Four Hundred Souls: A Community History of African America, 1619–2019, edited with Keisha N. Blain. New York: One World. ISBN 978-0-593-13404-7. OCLC 1224592485
- 2022. How to Raise an Antiracist. New York: One World. ISBN 978-0-593-24253-7. OCLC 1311591831.
- 2022. Goodnight Racism. New York: Kokila. ISBN 978-0593110515. OCLC 1330205594.
- 2025. Malcolm Lives!, a biography of Malcolm X. New York: Farrar, Straus and Giroux. ISBN 9780374311865. OCLC 1423038816.
- 2026. Chain of Ideas: The Origins of Our Authoritarian Age. New York: One World. ISBN 978-0593978023.

=== Selected academic papers ===
- 2008. "Required Service-Learning Courses: A Disciplinary Necessity to Preserve the Decaying Social Mission of Black Studies" (as Ibram Rogers). Journal of Black Studies 40(6):1119–35. doi:10.1177/0021934708325734. S2CID 144489262.
- 2014. "Nationalizing Resistance: Race and New York in the 20th Century". New York History 95(4):537–42. doi:10.1353/nyh.2014.0000. S2CID 165487830.
- 2018 July 15. "Black Doctoral Studies: The Radically Antiracist Idea of Molefi Kete Asante". Journal of Black Studies 49(6):542–58. doi:10.1177/0021934718786124. S2CID 149677943.

=== Selected publications ===
- 2016 January 22. "Reclaiming MLK's Unspeakable Nightmare: The Progression of Racism in America". Black Perspectives. African American Intellectual History Society (AAIHS).
- 2016 April 8. "An Intellectual History of a Book Title: Stamped from the Beginning". Black Perspectives. AAIHS.
- 2017 July 2. "Analysis: The Civil Rights Act was a victory against racism. But racists also won". The Washington Post.
- 2017 November 13. "Perspective: Trump sounds ignorant of history. But racist ideas often masquerade as ignorance". The Washington Post.
- 2018 January 13. "Opinion: The Heartbeat of Racism Is Denial". The New York Times.
- 2018 December 6. "This is what an antiracist America would look like. How do we get there?". The Guardian.
- 2019 January 10. "What I Learned From Cancer". The Atlantic.
- 2019 June 19. "There Is No Middle Ground on Reparations". The Atlantic.
- 2020 May 4. "We're Still Living and Dying in the Slaveholders' Republic". The Atlantic.
- 2020 June 1. "The American Nightmare". The Atlantic.
- 2021 July 9. "There Is No Debate Over Critical Race Theory". The Atlantic.

=== Video recordings ===
- 2016 December 16. "Commencement Speech: Are you an intellectual?" University of Florida.
- 2018 February 8. "Prof. Ibram X. Kendi: Stamped From the Beginning: The Definitive History of Racist Ideas in America" [1:28:57]. National History Center, American Historical Association. via YouTube.
- 2018 May 18. "MLTalks: Ibram X. Kendi in conversation with Danielle Wood" [1:35:00]. MIT Media Labs. via YouTube.
- 2019 June 26. "How to be an Antiracist" [54:53]. Aspen Ideas Festival. Aspen, Colo.: The Aspen Institute. via YouTube.
- 2019 September 18. "Ibram X. Kendi on How to be an Antiracist, at UC Berkeley | #400Years" [2:04:29]. Othering & Belonging Institute, UC Berkeley. via YouTube.
- 2019 August 13. "Ibram X. Kendi on Antiracism, Anticapitalism and the Eugenicist Origins of IQ and SAT tests" [41:22]. Democracy Now!. via YouTube.
