= The Emancipator =

The Emancipator may refer to:

== Media ==
- The Emancipator (newspaper), American anti-slavery newspaper founded in 1833
- The Emancipator (website), American online newspaper founded in 2021
- Manumission Intelligencier, American anti-slavery newspaper later renamed The Emancipator

== People ==
- Abraham Lincoln, President of the United States
- Daniel O'Connell (1775–1847), Irish nationalist politician who achieved Catholic emancipation in the United Kingdom

== See also ==
- Emancipation
- Emancipator (musician)
