= How to Be an Antiracist =

2019 nonfiction book by Ibram X. Kendi

- Front cover
- Author: Ibram X. Kendi
- Subject: Civil rights, antiracism
- Publisher: One World
- Publication date: August 13, 2019
- Pages: 320
- ISBN: 978-0-5255-0928-8

How to Be an Antiracist is a 2019 nonfiction book by American author and historian Ibram X. Kendi, which combines social commentary and memoir. It was published by One World, an imprint of Random House. The book discusses concepts of racism and Kendi's proposals for anti-racist individual actions and systemic changes.

== Background ==
Kendi is the founder of the Antiracist Research & Policy Center at American University in Washington, D.C. How to Be an Antiracist expands on ideas from Kendi's previous book, Stamped from the Beginning, which won the National Book Award in 2016.

== Synopsis ==
The book is organized into chapters that each examine a different theme through a racial lens. These themes include "dueling consciousness", "power", "biology", "ethnicity", "body", "culture", "behavior", "color", "white", "black", "class", "space", "gender", and "sexuality". Kendi relates his evolving concept of racism through the events of his own life over four decades, touching on observations and experiences as a child, young adult, student, and professor, from classes he has taught, via contemporary events such as the O. J. Simpson robbery case and 2000 United States presidential election, and through historical events such as the scientific proposals of polygenism in Europe in the 1600s and racial segregation in the United States. Kendi further details the manifestations of racism, such as scientific racism, colorism and their intersection with demographics including gender, class and sexuality, arguing that racism is founded in both patriarchy and capitalism.

Kendi argues that the opposite of racist is anti-racist rather than simply non-racist, and that there is no middle ground in the struggle against racism; one is either actively confronting racial inequality or allowing it to exist through action or inaction. He defines racism as any policy that creates inequitable outcomes between people of different skin colors; for instance, affirmative action in college admissions is anti-racist in that is designed to remedy past racial discrimination, while inaction on climate change is racist because of the disproportionately severe impacts of climate change in the predominantly non-white Global South. Kendi defines a racist person as anyone who supports racist policies "through their actions or inaction or expressing a racist idea", while an anti-racist person is someone who supports anti-racist policies "through their actions or expressing an antiracist idea". He draws upon what he describes as his own lifelong racism to argue that anyone, regardless of race, can be racist when they express harmful stereotypes about entire groups. Kendi relates how he once accepted certain stereotypes about black people, such as that black youth devalue education, and how he once wore colored contact lenses in order to not "look black". He calls such internalized racism "the real black on black crime". Kendi disagrees with the prejudice plus power model of racism, which would not allow for Black racism.

Finally, Kendi suggests models for anti-racist individual actions and systemic (i.e. policy) changes. He uses the metaphor of racism as a cancer to argue for society-wide "treatments" such as ending racist policies (as one might remove a tumor), "exercising" anti-racist ideas, consuming "healthy food for thought", and being vigilant toward a recurrence of racism "before it can grow and threaten the body politic". Rather than presenting a how-to guide, Kendi uses his own experience as an example of shifting one's focus from the personal to the systemic regarding racial issues. He argues that "being antiracist requires persistent self-awareness, constant self-criticism, and regular self-examination".

== Sales ==
How to Be an Antiracist was named one of Time's "must-read" books of 2019. In June 2020, following protests in the wake of the murder of George Floyd, sales of the book surged, and it became a best seller on Amazon.com. The book was listed eighth and fifth in Publishers Weekly's hardcover non-fiction list on May 30 and June 6, respectively. It was listed third in USA Today's best-selling books list of June 10. The book reached #1 on The New York Times Best Seller List in Hardcover Nonfiction list for sales in the week ending June 6. By March 24, 2021, it had spent 45 weeks on the list.

== Critical reception ==
The book received starred reviews in Publishers Weekly, Library Journal, and Kirkus Reviews. Publishers Weekly described Kendi's prose as "thoughtful, sincere and polished" and the book's ideas as "boldly articulated" and "historically informed", stating that the book would "spark many conversations". Kirkus Reviews found it to be "not an easy read but an essential one". Library Journal said that "[Kendi's] stories serv[e] as a springboard for potent explorations of race, gender, [and] colorism". A review in Journal of Communication Inquiry said the book "succeeds at fitting into many genres including autobiography, memoir, and even how-to guide" and that it was "commendable" how Kendi presents cultural concepts through stories from his own life. A review in the journal Urban Education described the book as "necessary for all echelons of education".

Black studies scholar Jeffrey C. Stewart called it the "most courageous book to date on the problem of race in the Western mind". Professor of civil rights law Randall Kennedy said the book displays candor, independence, and self-criticality, but that it has major flaws, especially being internally contradictory and poorly reasoned.

Ericka Taylor of NPR described the book as "clear and compelling" and "accessible", saying it "exemplifies a commitment to clarity". A review in The Christian Science Monitor called the book "thought-provoking and insightful" and an "important and necessary contribution" toward understanding racism in the United States. Journalist Afua Hirsch writes that Kendi shows "honesty in linking his personal struggles" to the book's subject, which Hirsch describes as "brilliantly simple" and "dogmatic", but that the book's personal anecdotes seem incomplete and the style resembles that of a textbook too much. It was the Book of the Day in a review for The Observer in which Colin Grant found that the book "encourages self-reflection" and described the writing style as "calm" but "insightful". Commentator Andrew Sullivan wrote that the book has the character of a religious tract with overly simplistic distinctions between good and evil that cannot be falsified, and is sparse on practical suggestions.

Behavior geneticist Kathryn Paige Harden argues that while "race is not a valid biological category", Kendi is nonetheless incorrect for stating in the book that "there are no genetic differences between groups of people who identify as different races". Harden points to this as an example of "moral commitments to racial equality" being "on shaky ground if they depend on exact genetic sameness across human populations". Geneticist Joseph L. Graves Jr. calls this a straw man, writing in The Lancet that Harden misses "a central point: human populations do not differ substantially in the frequencies of genetic variants that determine their complex behaviour, including intelligence and personality."
