= Joel Christian Gill =

American cartoonist, educator, and author (born 1975)

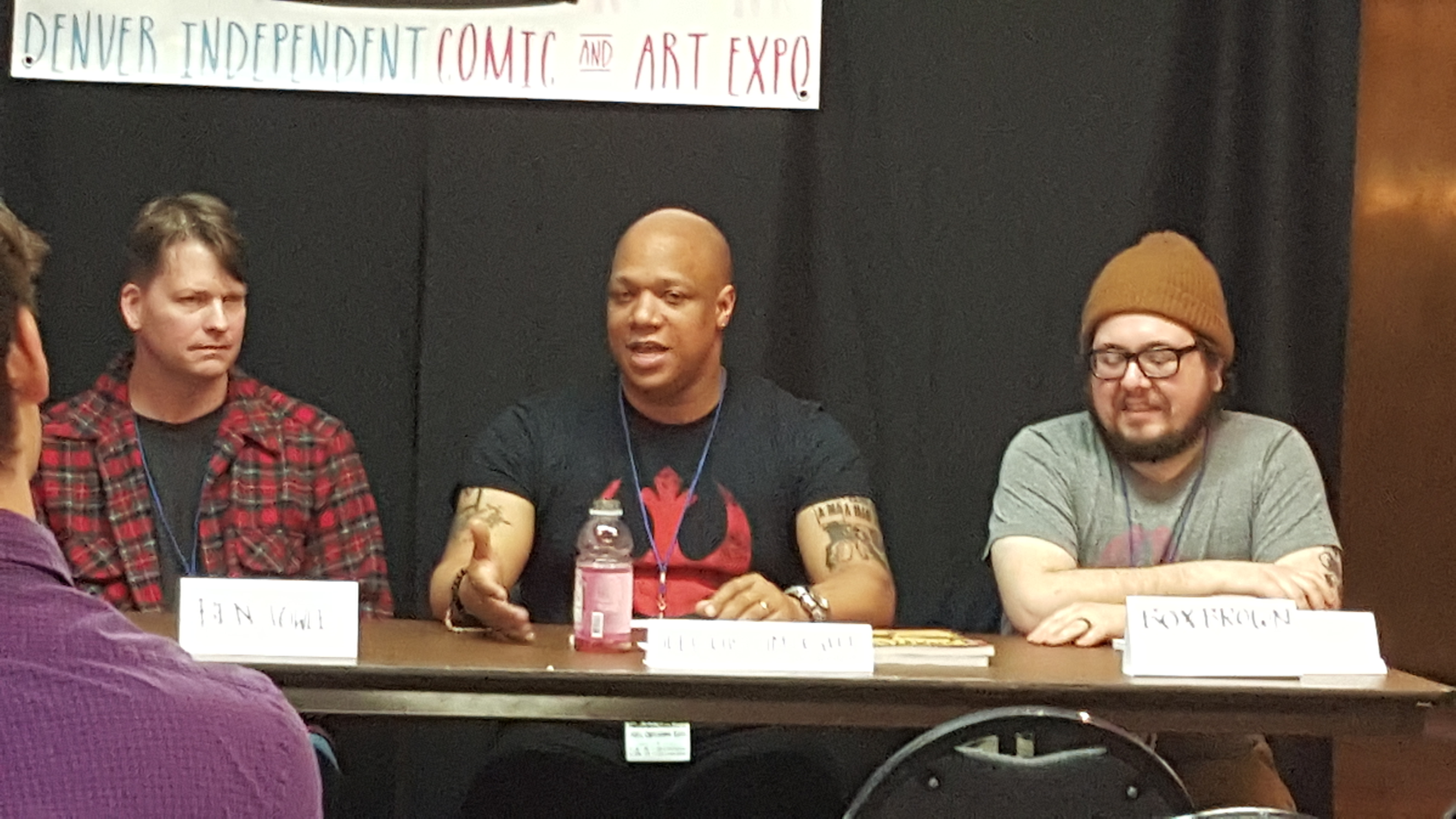
- Gill at Dink Comics and Art Expo 2016
- Born: 15 January 1975 (age 51); Roanoke, Virginia
- Education: Roanoke College; Boston University
- Website: www.joelchristiangill.com

Joel Christian Gill (born 15 January 1975) is an American cartoonist, educator, and author of a number of graphic novels from Fulcrum Publishing: Strange Fruit Vol I : Uncelebrated Narratives from Black History, Bass Reeves: Tales of the Talented Tenth No.1, and Bessie Stringfield: Tales of the Talented Tenth, No. 2, Strange Fruit Vol II: More Uncelebrated Narratives from Black History, a picture book "Fast Enough: Bessie Stringfield's First Ride" from Lion Forge and Fights: One Boy's Triumph Over Violence, a graphic memoir from Oni Press about Gill's childhood experiences with violence, bullying and sexual abuse. He has taught studio art, Illustration and comics while serving as Chair of the Comic Arts and Foundations programs at the New Hampshire Institute of Art and as an Associate Professor of Illustration at Massachusetts College of Art and Design. In 2023 he adaptated Dr. Ibram X Kendi's Stamped from the Beginning: a Definitive History of Racist Ideas in America for Ten Speed Press. He is currently the inaugural chair of the MFA in Visual Narrative at Boston University.

== Early life ==
Gill earned a Bachelor of Arts in Art from Roanoke College and a Master of Fine Arts in Painting from Boston University in 2004.

== Career ==
Owing to the success of his ongoing series of graphic novels about little-known historical African-Americans and the contributions they made to American history, Gill is frequently profiled in print and interviewed on television and radio. He is also asked to speak at comic arts conventions and college campuses across the U.S.

He has also contributed to the Huffington Post advocating for the end to Black History Month and for the incorporation of the achievements of African-Americans into the larger narrative of American history. Gill is also a member of the Boston Comics Roundtable.

== Awards and honors ==
In 2016, Gill was honored with a Distinguished Alumni Award from Boston University.

Awards for Gill's books
Year	Title	Award	Result	Ref.
2018	Bessie Stringfield: Tales of the Talented Tenth, No. 2	Great Graphic Novels for Teens	Selection	
2019	Strange Fruit, Volume II: More Uncelebrated Narratives from Black History	Great Graphic Novels for Teens	Selection	
2021	Fights: One Boy's Triumph Over Violence	Great Graphic Novels for Teens	Top 10	

== Publications ==
=== Standalone books ===
- Fast Enough: Bessie Stringfield's First Ride (2019)
- Fights: One Boy's Triumph Over Violence (2020)
- Stamped from the Beginning: A Graphic History of Racist Ideas in America (2023)

=== Strange Fruit duology ===
1. Strange Fruit, Volume I: Uncelebrated Narratives from Black History (2014)
2. Strange Fruit, Volume II: More Uncelebrated Narratives from Black History (2018)

=== Tales of the Talented Tenth trilogy ===
- Bass Reeves (2014)
- Bessie Stringfield (2016)
- Robert Smalls (2021)
