= Ketanji Brown Jackson Supreme Court nomination =

United States Supreme Court nomination

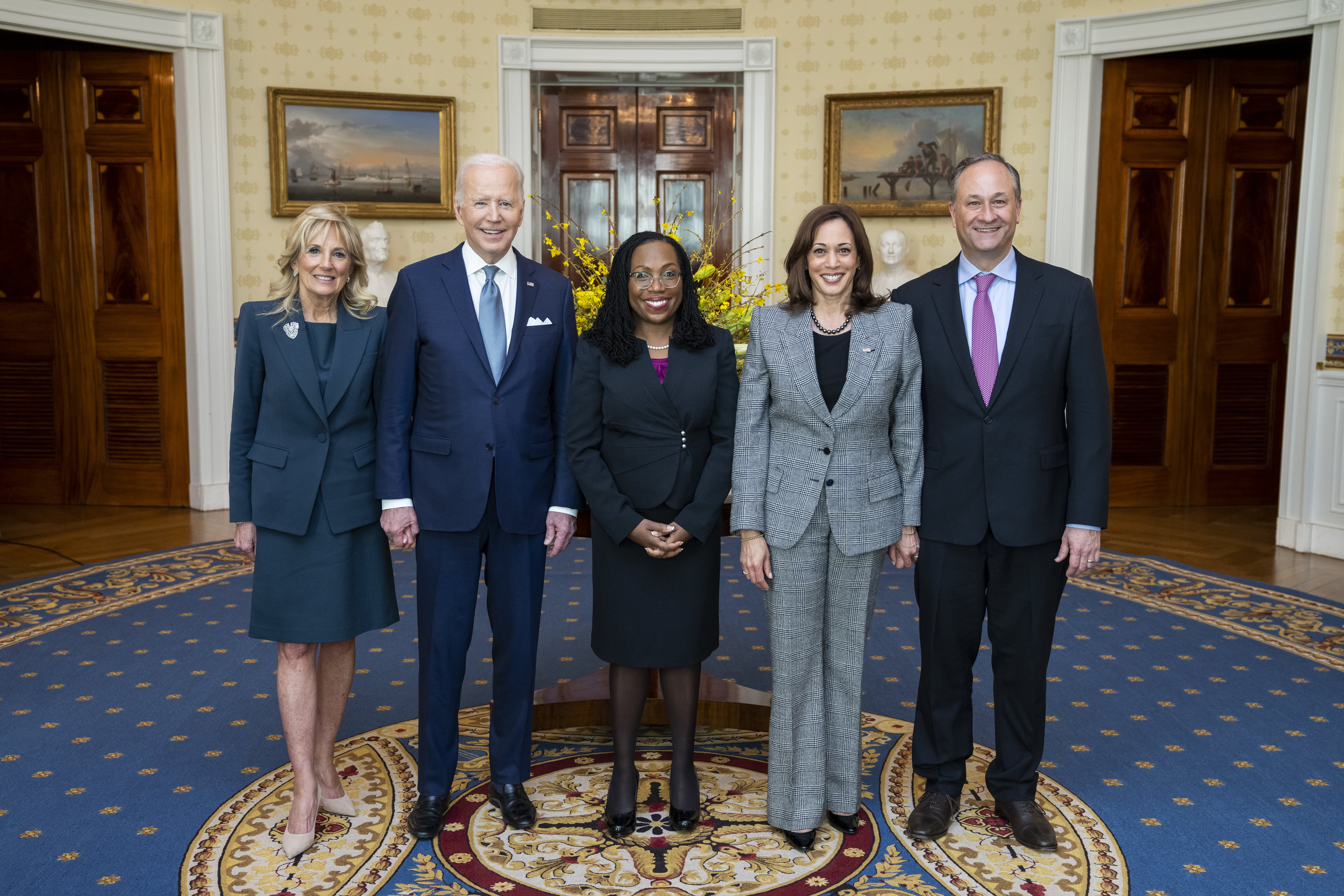
- President Biden, First Lady Jill Biden, Vice President Kamala Harris and Second Gentleman Doug Emhoff pose with Ketanji Brown Jackson in the Blue Room of the White House after the announcement of the nomination.
- Nominee: Ketanji Brown Jackson
- Nominated by: Joe Biden (president of the United States)
- Succeeding: Stephen Breyer (associate justice)
- Date nominated: February 25, 2022 (nomination announced); February 28, 2022 (nomination submitted to U.S. Senate)
- Date confirmed: April 7, 2022
- Outcome: Approved by the U.S. Senate

Vote of the Senate Judiciary Committee
- Votes in favor: 11
- Votes against: 11
- Result: Deadlocked on motion to report favorably

Senate vote to discharge the nomination from the Judiciary Committee
- Votes in favor: 53
- Votes against: 47
- Result: Motion approved

Senate cloture vote
- Votes in favor: 53
- Votes against: 47
- Result: Cloture invoked

Senate confirmation vote
- Votes in favor: 53
- Votes against: 47
- Result: Confirmed

On February 25, 2022, President Joe Biden announced that he would nominate Ketanji Brown Jackson to the position of associate justice of the Supreme Court of the United States to fill the vacancy by Stephen Breyer, who announced his retirement on January 27, 2022, at the age of 83. Jackson, a former law clerk of Breyer, was a judge on the United States Court of Appeals for the District of Columbia Circuit, having been appointed by Biden in 2021. Jackson is the first Black woman in U.S. history to be nominated to serve on the U.S. Supreme Court.

Her nomination was sent to the Senate on February 28, and her confirmation hearings were held by the Senate Judiciary Committee from March 21 to 24, 2022. The Senate confirmed her on April 7, 2022, by a 53 to 47 vote. She took the oath of office on June 30, 2022.

== Background ==
Under the Appointments Clause (Article II, Section 2) of the United States Constitution, judicial appointments are made by the president of the United States with the Advice and Consent of the United States Senate. Breyer was nominated to the Supreme Court by Bill Clinton on August 3, 1994, to fill the vacancy caused by the retirement of Harry Blackmun. Breyer was confirmed by the Senate by a vote of 87–9. On the Supreme Court, Breyer was often a member of the court's liberal wing.

=== Retirement of Justice Breyer ===
On January 26, 2022, NBC News reported that Justice Breyer planned to retire at the end of the court's current term. In response to request for comment, White House Press Secretary Jen Psaki tweeted, "It has always been the decision of any Supreme Court Justice if and when they decide to retire, and how they want to announce it, and that remains the case today." President Biden cited his experience as chair of the Senate Judiciary Committee from 1987 to 1997 as the driving force in the process of finding a candidate similar to Justice Breyer. His retirement left Samuel Alito as the lone remaining military veteran on the U.S. Supreme Court.

In the wake of the impending Supreme Court vacancy, Democratic groups announced plans for a multi-million dollar campaign to promote Biden's eventual nominee. Demand Justice, a nonprofit led by Democratic strategists, said it would spend whatever it takes in order to get the nomination through the Senate.

== Nomination ==
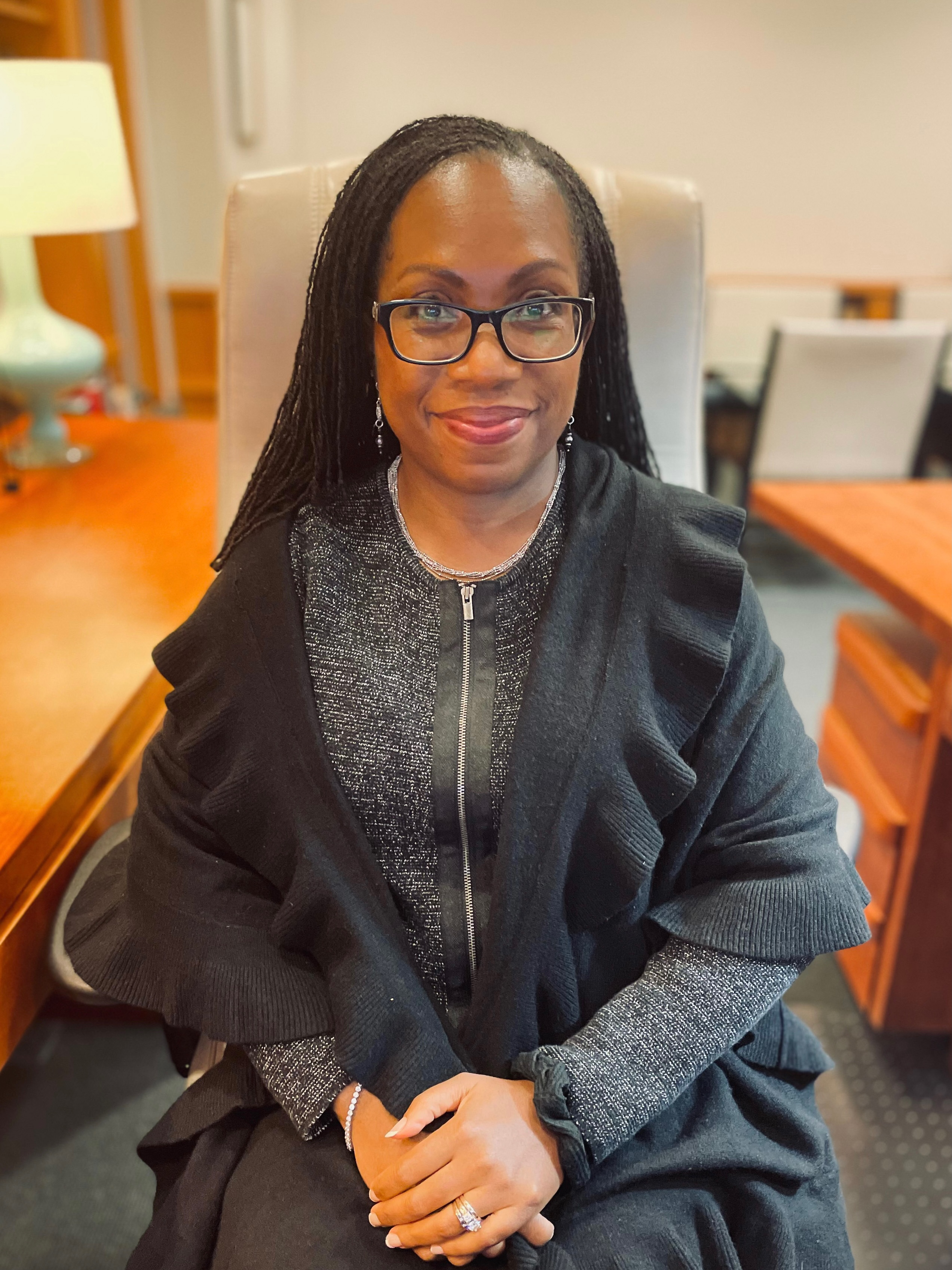
Jackson in 2022

=== Potential candidates ===
On January 27, Biden reiterated his intention to keep his campaign promise to nominate a Black woman. An ABC News/Ipsos poll a few days after found that 76% of Americans believed Biden should consider all possible nominees, while a substantially smaller share of Democrats, at 54%, said the same. Only 23% said he should follow through on his pledge to consider only nominees who are Black women. A simultaneous Morning Consult/Politico poll found that 51% of Americans supported Biden's intention to nominate a Black woman, including 82% of Democrats and 47% of independents. A poll in early February by Data for Progress found that 64% of Americans (including 93% of Democrats and 59% of independents) supported Biden's decision to nominate a Black woman.

Some Republicans criticized Biden's pledge to nominate the first Black woman to the court as hypocritical, referencing his 2005 threat to filibuster Janice Rogers Brown, a conservative judge on the D.C. Circuit Court of Appeals, if she was nominated to the Supreme Court.

Around February 22, 2022, it was reported that Biden had met with his top three contenders, Ketanji Brown Jackson, J. Michelle Childs, and Leondra Kruger.

=== Announcement ===
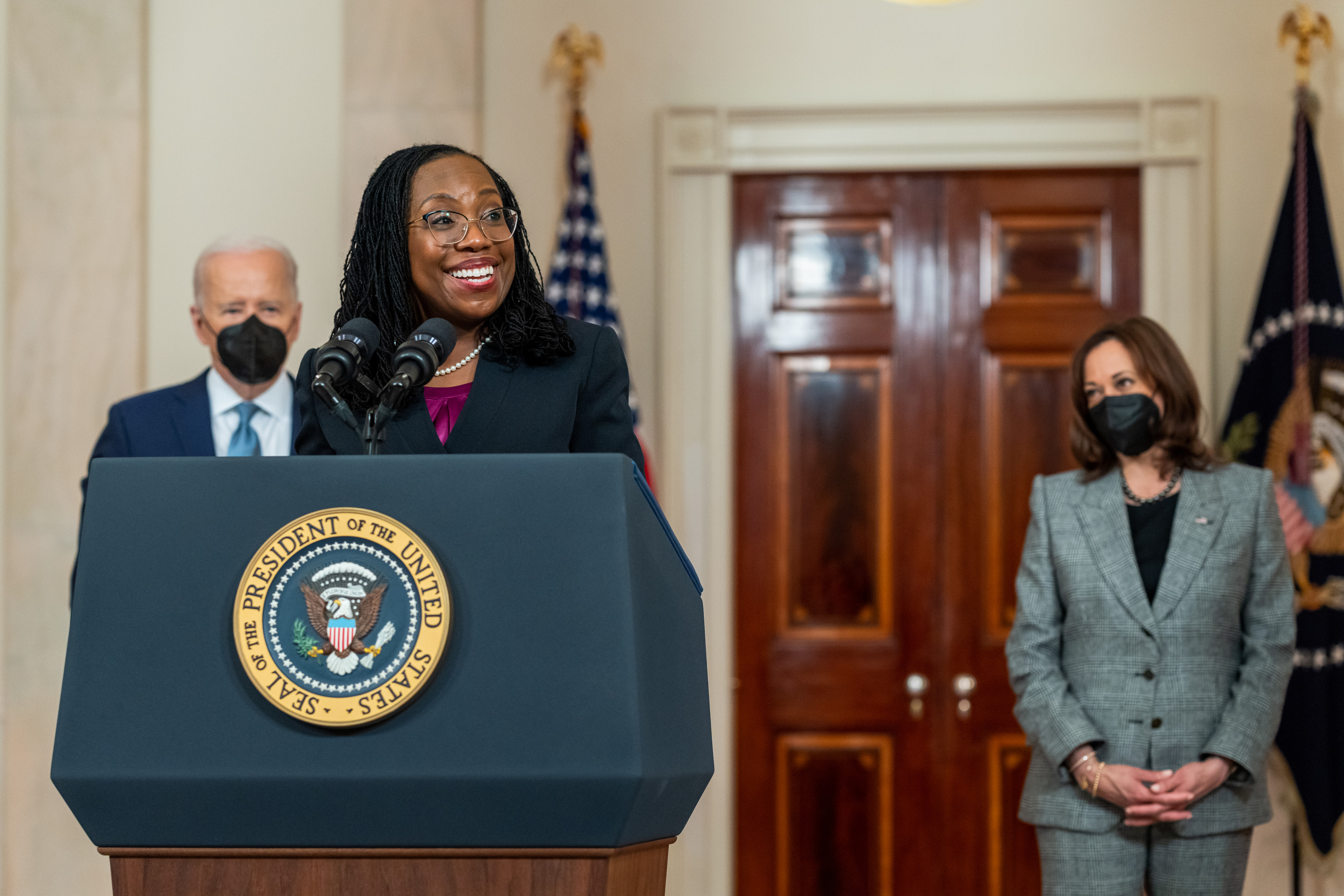
Jackson delivers remarks on her nomination in the Grand Foyer of the White House, February 25, 2022.

On February 25, 2022, it was announced that Biden would nominate Jackson. In his remarks on the announcement, Biden listed "traits of pragmatism, historical perspective, wisdom, [and] character" as criteria for the nomination, characterized Jackson's rulings as "carefully reasoned, tethered to precedent, and [demonstrating respect] for how the law impacts everyday people," and cited her experience as a public defender, trial court judge, and member of the Sentencing Commission.

=== Voting alignment ===
Analysis by FiveThirtyEight reported that Jackson would likely rule in similar ways to other Democratic appointees on the Court, with Judicial Common Space scores placing her as slightly more moderate than these justices and estimates from the Database of Ideology, Money in Politics, and Elections placing her as slightly more liberal than them.

== Responses to nomination ==
=== Support ===
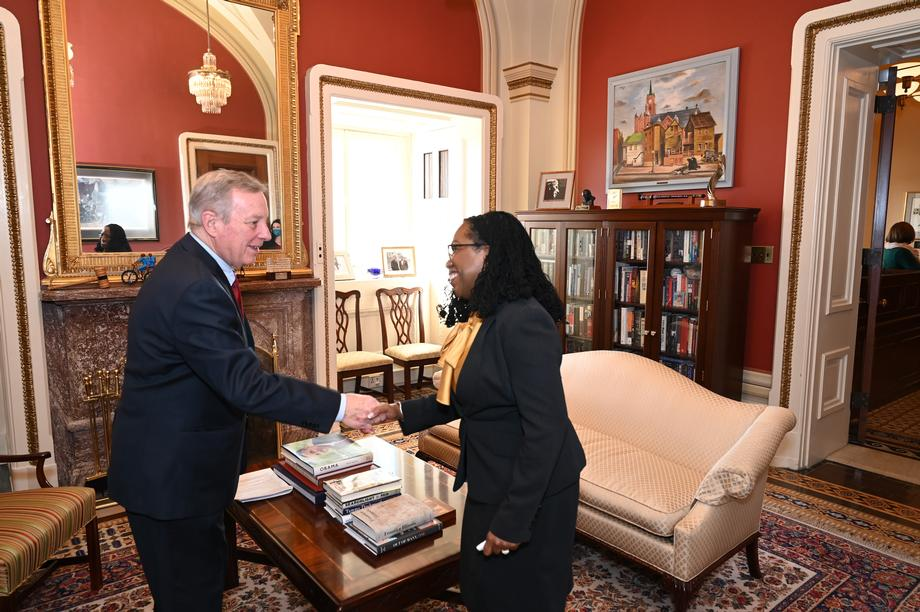
Jackson meets with Senate Judiciary Committee Chairman Dick Durbin.

Senate Majority Leader Chuck Schumer and Democratic members of the Judiciary Committee including Dick Durbin, Sheldon Whitehouse, Richard Blumenthal, Amy Klobuchar, and Patrick Leahy voiced their support for Jackson's nomination.

House majority whip Jim Clyburn, who had earlier lobbied Biden to nominate U.S. District Judge J. Michelle Childs, expressed his support for Jackson and called for "strong bipartisan support" in the confirmation process.

Jackson's nomination also received support from two former federal Circuit Court judges appointed by Republican presidents, Thomas B. Griffith and J. Michael Luttig. Clark M. Neily, senior vice president for legal studies at the Cato Institute, also endorsed Jackson's nomination.

In March, 83 former state attorneys general signed a letter to the Senate Judiciary Committee endorsing Jackson's nomination. Although not a formal endorsement, the American Bar Association's Standing Committee on the Federal Judiciary unanimously rated Jackson "Well Qualified" to serve on the Supreme Court.

=== Opposition ===
Some Republican Party leaders and senators voiced early opposition, while many others stated that they would evaluate Jackson's nomination. Senate Minority Leader Mitch McConnell characterized Jackson as "the favored choice of far-left dark-money groups that have spent years attacking the legitimacy and structure of the court itself". The Republican National Committee called Jackson "a radical, left-wing activist who would rubberstamp Biden's disastrous agenda". Republican senator Lindsey Graham, who had previously voted in favor of Jackson's confirmation to the DC Circuit Court of Appeals the previous year, stated that the nomination "means the radical Left has won President Biden over yet again". Former district court judge U. W. Clemon wrote to Biden urging him not to appoint Jackson to the Supreme Court.

Some Republican lawmakers, such as senators Marsha Blackburn, Josh Hawley, and Ted Cruz have criticized Brown's sentencing of child pornography offenders below the sentencing guideline and her support for reducing or removing mandatory minimums for such offenders while on the United States Sentencing Commission. Fact checks from the New York Times and Washington Post said these criticisms were misleading, a distortion of her record, and in part snipped out of context.

=== Polling ===
A poll of registered voters conducted by Politico and Morning Consult during February 25–27 found that 46% of respondents favored Jackson's confirmation, 17% opposed it, and 36% had no opinion. A Gallup poll conducted during March 1–18 found that 58% of respondents favored Jackson's confirmation, 30% opposed it, and 12% had no opinion. FiveThirtyEight collected a set of 14 polls conducted during February 25 to March 22 by various entities, which found that an average of 47% of Americans supported her confirmation, 23% opposed it, and 30% had no opinion.

== Judiciary Committee review ==
=== Confirmation hearings ===
On March 2, Senate Democrats announced that they would schedule confirmation hearings for March 21 through March 24, intending to finish the process before the chamber's Easter recess in early April.

Jackson's confirmation "sherpa" (advisor to guide her through the process, and prepare her for her hearings) was former senator Doug Jones.

On March 21, Jackson delivered an opening statement to the committee acknowledging the confirmation process and her past, and thanking her mentors and family members. Several members of the 22 person committee gave opening statements with Democrats speaking to Jackson's historic nomination, her qualifications and that her experience as a public defender "helps her to understand our justice system uniquely, through the eyes of people who couldn't afford a lawyer." Republicans expressed various concerns they intended to explore, including her sentencing record in child pornography convictions and as to "whether Judge Jackson is committed to the Constitution as originally understood." A question by Senator Ted Cruz, "Do you agree with this book that is being taught with kids that babies are racist?" prompted Jackson to say she never read the book, as well as disagreeing with making any child feel that they were racist, victims, or oppressors. The exchange also dramatically increased sales of the book Antiracist Baby.

On March 22, Jackson underwent the first round of questions from 20 senators of the Judiciary Committee for 13 hours. Jackson was asked questions related to critical race theory, dark money, abortion, gender identity, judicial activism, possible expansion of the Supreme Court (known as court-packing) and her sentencing record on child pornography cases. Jackson declined to answer when asked to provide the definition of a woman by Marsha Blackburn (R-TN), saying that she could not "in this context." and that "I'm not a biologist." Additionally, Cory Booker (D-NJ) inquired as to how she has been able to manage a work-life balance between motherhood with two daughters and her legal career. Other Republican senators accused her of being soft on crime.

On March 23, Jackson faced another round of questions for 10 hours, describing her judicial philosophy and defending her judgements on cases. She was grilled with a range of questions related to abortion, gun rights, and court-packing. Jackson, who sits on the Harvard Board of Overseers, stated that if confirmed, she would recuse herself from the Supreme Court's review of Students for Fair Admissions v. President and Fellows of Harvard College.

On March 24, the committee heard witness testimony from representatives of the American Bar Association, Democratic representative Joyce Beatty, and the Republican Alabama Attorney General, Steve Marshall. During his testimony, Marshall refused to acknowledge Joe Biden as the "duly elected and lawfully serving" president of the United States, which was widely reported in the media.

=== Committee vote ===
On April 4, 2022, the Senate Judiciary Committee held a vote on whether to advance Jackson's nomination to the full Senate. The party-line vote resulted in a tie, with all 11 Democratic members voting in favor and all 11 Republican members voting against.

On the motion to report the nomination with a positive recommendation, the votes were as follows:

- Yea ▌ Democrats: Dick Durbin, Patrick Leahy, Dianne Feinstein, Sheldon Whitehouse, Amy Klobuchar, Chris Coons, Richard Blumenthal, Mazie Hirono, Cory Booker, Alex Padilla, Jon Ossoff.
- Nay ▌ Republicans: Chuck Grassley, Lindsey Graham, John Cornyn, Mike Lee, Ted Cruz, Ben Sasse, Josh Hawley, Tom Cotton, John Kennedy, Thom Tillis, Marsha Blackburn.

Result: Tied, no recommendation.

== Full Senate votes ==
=== Discharge from committee ===
On April 4, 2022, the Senate voted to discharge Jackson's nomination from the Judiciary Committee with a vote of 53–47, with three Republicans (Susan Collins, Lisa Murkowski, and Mitt Romney) joining all 50 members of the Democratic caucus to pass the motion. A discharge vote was necessary because of the tied vote in the Judiciary Committee. This was first time that the Senate has discharged the Judiciary Committee from consideration of a Supreme Court nomination since 1853.

=== Confirmation ===
On April 7, 2022, the Senate invoked cloture on her nomination by a 53–47 vote with the same senators voting "yea". She was subsequently confirmed by the same margin with once again the same senators voting "yea", announced by Vice President Kamala Harris.

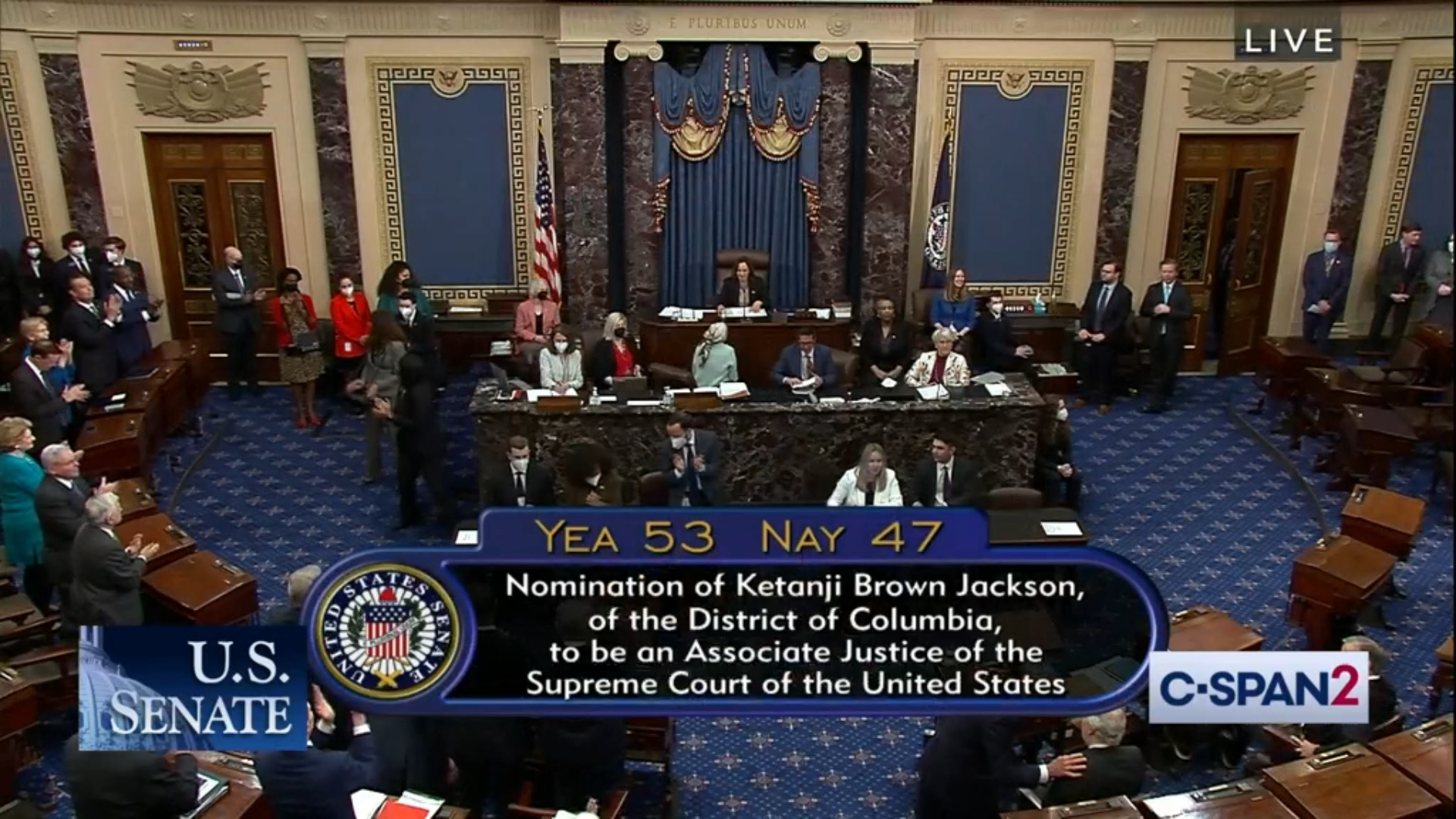
Announcement of the final vote on Jackson's nomination on April 7, 2022

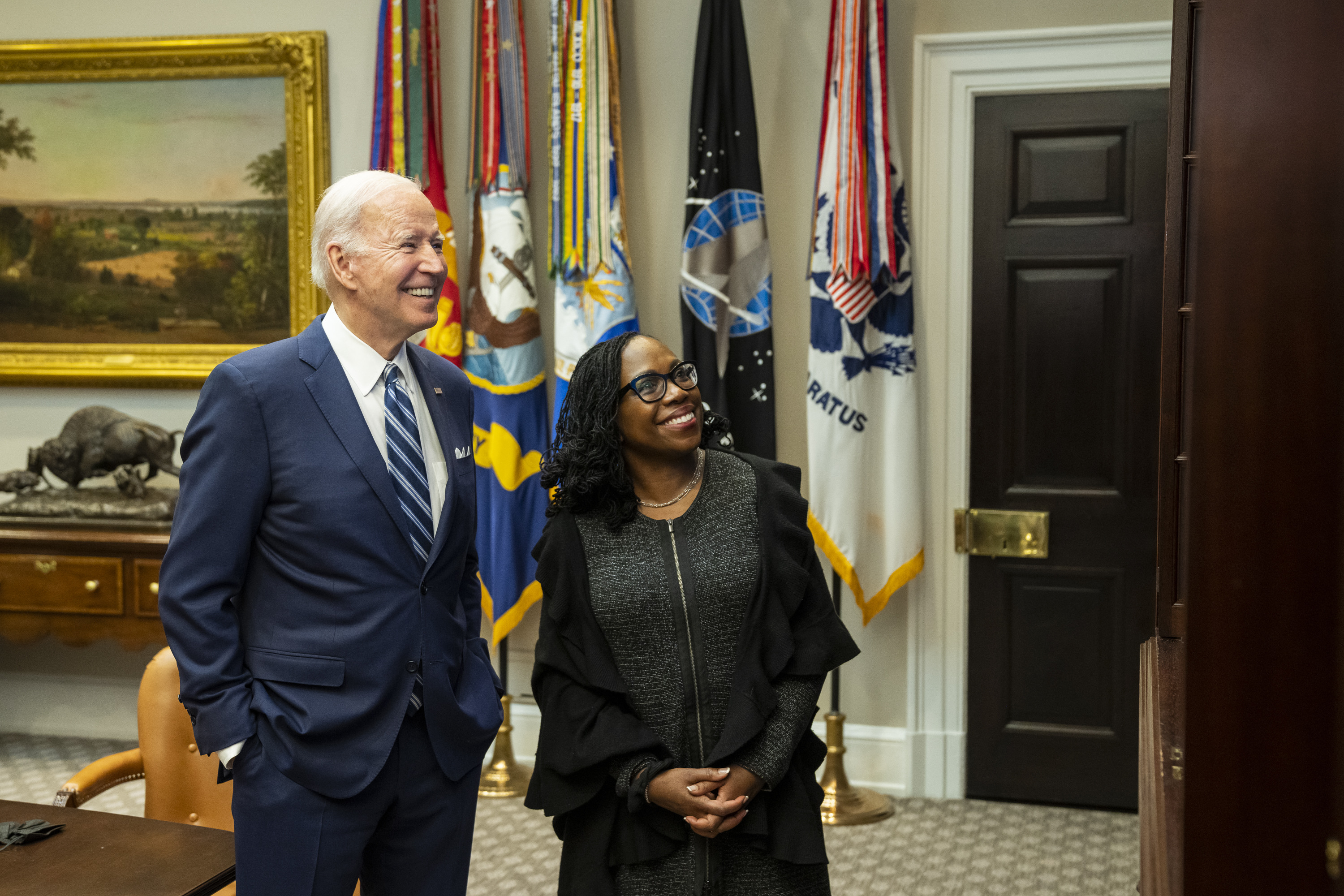
Biden and Jackson watch the Senate vote on her confirmation in the Roosevelt Room, April 7, 2022.

Vote to confirm the Jackson nomination
April 7, 2022	Party			Total votes
April 7, 2022	Democratic	Republican	Independent	Total votes
Yea	48	3	2	53
Nay	0	47	0	47
Result: Confirmed
Roll call vote on the nomination: Senator / Party / State / Vote; Tammy Baldwin / D / Wisconsin / Yea; John Barrasso / R / Wyoming / Nay; Michael Bennet / D / Colorado / Yea; Marsha Blackburn / R / Tennessee / Nay; Richard Blumenthal / D / Connecticut / Yea; Roy Blunt / R / Missouri / Nay; Cory Booker / D / New Jersey / Yea; John Boozman / R / Arkansas / Nay; Mike Braun / R / Indiana / Nay; Sherrod Brown / D / Ohio / Yea; Richard Burr / R / North Carolina / Nay; Maria Cantwell / D / Washington / Yea; Shelley Moore Capito / R / West Virginia / Nay; Ben Cardin / D / Maryland / Yea; Tom Carper / D / Delaware / Yea; Bob Casey Jr. / D / Pennsylvania / Yea; Bill Cassidy / R / Louisiana / Nay; Susan Collins / R / Maine / Yea; Chris Coons / D / Delaware / Yea; John Cornyn / R / Texas / Nay; Catherine Cortez Masto / D / Nevada / Yea; Tom Cotton / R / Arkansas / Nay; Kevin Cramer / R / North Dakota / Nay; Mike Crapo / R / Idaho / Nay; Ted Cruz / R / Texas / Nay; Steve Daines / R / Montana / Nay; Tammy Duckworth / D / Illinois / Yea; Dick Durbin / D / Illinois / Yea; Joni Ernst / R / Iowa / Nay; Dianne Feinstein / D / California / Yea; Deb Fischer / R / Nebraska / Nay; Kirsten Gillibrand / D / New York / Yea; Lindsey Graham / R / South Carolina / Nay; Chuck Grassley / R / Iowa / Nay; Bill Hagerty / R / Tennessee / Nay; Maggie Hassan / D / New Hampshire / Yea; Josh Hawley / R / Missouri / Nay; Martin Heinrich / D / New Mexico / Yea; John Hickenlooper / D / Colorado / Yea; Mazie Hirono / D / Hawaii / Yea; John Hoeven / R / North Dakota / Nay; Cindy Hyde-Smith / R / Mississippi / Nay; Jim Inhofe / R / Oklahoma / Nay; Ron Johnson / R / Wisconsin / Nay; Tim Kaine / D / Virginia / Yea; Mark Kelly / D / Arizona / Yea; John Kennedy / R / Louisiana / Nay; Angus King / I / Maine / Yea; Amy Klobuchar / D / Minnesota / Yea; James Lankford / R / Oklahoma / Nay; Patrick Leahy / D / Vermont / Yea; Mike Lee / R / Utah / Nay; Cynthia Lummis / R / Wyoming / Nay; Ben Ray Luján / D / New Mexico / Yea; Joe Manchin / D / West Virginia / Yea; Ed Markey / D / Massachusetts / Yea; Roger Marshall / R / Kansas / Nay; Mitch McConnell / R / Kentucky / Nay; Bob Menendez / D / New Jersey / Yea; Jeff Merkley / D / Oregon / Yea; Jerry Moran / R / Kansas / Nay; Lisa Murkowski / R / Alaska / Yea; Chris Murphy / D / Connecticut / Yea; Patty Murray / D / Washington / Yea; Jon Ossoff / D / Georgia / Yea; Alex Padilla / D / California / Yea; Rand Paul / R / Kentucky / Nay; Gary Peters / D / Michigan / Yea; Rob Portman / R / Ohio / Nay; Jack Reed / D / Rhode Island / Yea; Jim Risch / R / Idaho / Nay; Mitt Romney / R / Utah / Yea; Jacky Rosen / D / Nevada / Yea; Mike Rounds / R / South Dakota / Nay; Marco Rubio / R / Florida / Nay; Bernie Sanders / I / Vermont / Yea; Ben Sasse / R / Nebraska / Nay; Brian Schatz / D / Hawaii / Yea; Chuck Schumer / D / New York / Yea; Rick Scott / R / Florida / Nay; Tim Scott / R / South Carolina / Nay; Jeanne Shaheen / D / New Hampshire / Yea; Richard Shelby / R / Alabama / Nay; Kyrsten Sinema / D / Arizona / Yea; Tina Smith / D / Minnesota / Yea; Debbie Stabenow / D / Michigan / Yea; Dan Sullivan / R / Alaska / Nay; Jon Tester / D / Montana / Yea; John Thune / R / South Dakota / Nay; Thom Tillis / R / North Carolina / Nay; Pat Toomey / R / Pennsylvania / Nay; Tommy Tuberville / R / Alabama / Nay; Chris Van Hollen / D / Maryland / Yea; Mark Warner / D / Virginia / Yea; Raphael Warnock / D / Georgia / Yea; Elizabeth Warren / D / Massachusetts / Yea; Sheldon Whitehouse / D / Rhode Island / Yea; Roger Wicker / R / Mississippi / Nay; Ron Wyden / D / Oregon / Yea; Todd Young / R / Indiana / Nay

== See also ==
- Joe Biden Supreme Court candidates
- List of federal judges appointed by Joe Biden
