= Ashley Lukashevsky =

American visual artist

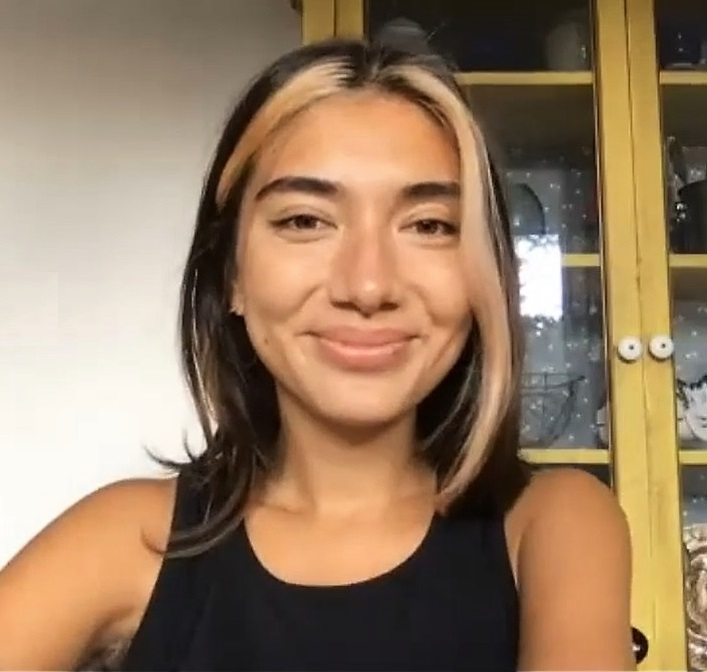
Lukashevsky in 2020

Ashley Lukashevsky is an American visual artist, illustrator, and graphic designer. Her work mainly focuses on social movements and issues, including LGBTQ+ rights, Black Lives Matter, and immigrant rights. She has created work for the American Civil Liberties Union (ACLU), Planned Parenthood, and Rock the Vote.

Lukashevsky was born and grew up in Honolulu, Hawaii. She graduated from the University of Southern California in 2015 with a major in international relations.

She is the illustrator of the board book Antiracist Baby, written by Ibram X. Kendi and published in 2020. The book was first on The New York Times Best Seller list for Children’s Picture Books in August 2020. In 2021, it was announced that Netflix would adapt the book into an animated series of musical shorts.

She illustrated the Pocket Change Collective book series, which began publishing in June 2020.

Lukashevsky is based in Los Angeles, California.
