= Bina Venkataraman =

American science policy expert, author and journalist

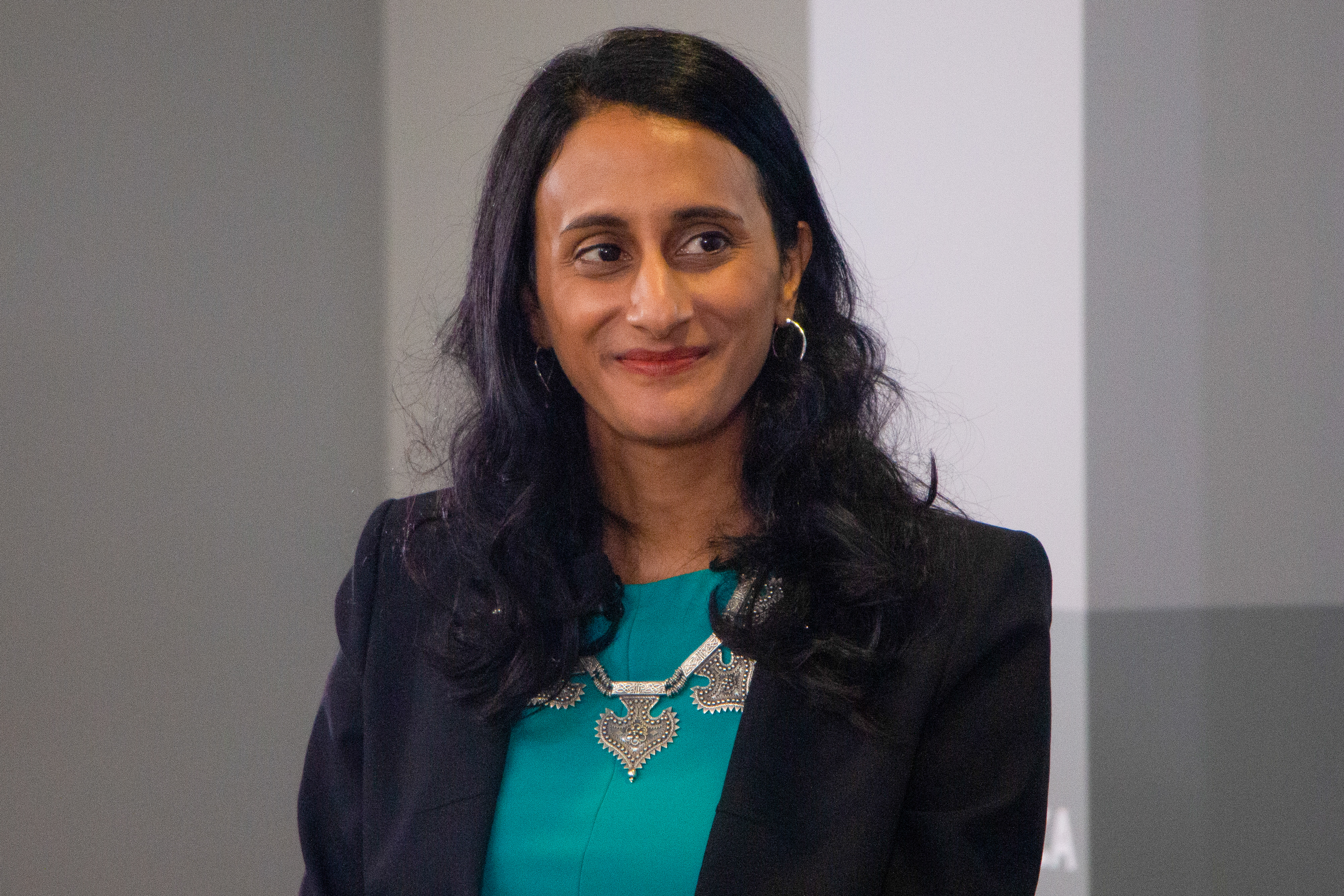
- Education: Brown University, BA; Harvard Kennedy School, MPP
- Employers: The Washington Post (2023–present); The Boston Globe (2019–2022); Broad Institute (2010–2019)
- Known for: Journalism and science and technology policy
- Notable work: The Optimist's Telescope: Thinking Ahead in a Reckless Age (2019)
- Awards: Fulbright Fellowship
- Website: writerbina.com

Bina Venkataraman (born October 11, 1979) is an American science policy expert, author, and journalist. She is currently a columnist at The Washington Post. She previously served as the editorial page editor of The Boston Globe and as a senior advisor for climate change innovation under President Barack Obama's administration. She also advised the President's Council of Advisors on Science and Technology and has taught at MIT and the Harvard Kennedy School.

== Early life and career ==
Venkataraman was born in 1979 to Indian immigrants and grew up in Wooster, Ohio. She was valedictorian of her class at Wooster High School.

Venkataraman received her Bachelor of Arts degree from Brown University in 2002, studying International Relations and Environmental Studies. She then received a Fulbright Program Fellowship and worked as a Communications and Research Coordinator at the Rainforest Alliance from 2002 to 2005, where she wrote about community and private-sector projects that supported rainforest conservation, including sustainable coffee farms and global eco-tourism. Venkataraman then became a Princeton in Asia fellow, working in Hanoi, Vietnam as a public health grant writer for an HIV/AIDS hospital.

In 2006, Venkataraman began studying Public Policy at the Harvard Kennedy School, where she received her Master's degree in 2008.

== Public policy ==
From 2010 to 2019, Venkataraman served as the Director of Global Policy Initiatives at the Broad Institute of Harvard University and taught at the Massachusetts Institute of Technology. During that time, she served as Senior Adviser to Eric Lander while he was co-chair of the President's Council of Advisors on Science and Technology (PCAST). In that capacity, she co-authored several reports for the PCAST, including a 2010 report on K-12 education in Science, Technology, Engineering, and Mathematics (STEM), a 2011 report on ensuring American leadership in advanced manufacturing, and a 2012 report on drug discovery, develop and evaluation. From 2013 to 2015, she took a sabbatical to work in the White House under President Barack Obama. There, she served as a senior advisor for climate change innovation, building partnerships among communities, companies, and government to prepare for climate disasters including heat waves, droughts, and coastal storms.

She previously served on Brown University's Institute for Environment and Society advisory board as well as Brown's President's Leadership Council, advising Christina Hull Paxson. She was also a Future Tense and Carnegie Fellow at the New America Foundation. She currently serves on the Advisory Board of Harvard’s Shorenstein Center on the Media, Politics, and Public Policy; on the MIT Corporation’s Visiting Committee on the Humanities; and on the Getty Museum's PST ART advisory council.

== Writing and journalism ==
Venkataraman is also an editor, writer, and author who has focused on climate change, technology, politics, and public health. Her work has been published in The Washington Post, The New York Times, and Time, among other publications. From 2006 to 2010, she worked on the science desks at The New York Times and The Boston Globe.

Venkataraman became the editorial page editor of The Boston Globe in November 2019. In this role, Venkataraman aimed to amplify the "diverse voices of our city and better showcase Boston’s groundbreaking ideas and knowledge -- while holding our leaders and institutions accountable for meeting high expectations for public service." In March 2020, she oversaw the editorial board's criticism of Donald Trump's response to the coronavirus disease 2019 (COVID-19) pandemic in the United States. Venkataraman stepped down as editorial page editor of the Globe, while staying with the paper as an editor-at-large and to help launch The Emancipator, at the end of 2021.

In August 2019, she published her first book, The Optimist's Telescope: Thinking Ahead in a Reckless Age, which explores how human societies can overcome shortsightedness to tackle emerging threats—from climate change to antibiotic-resistant superbugs—to better plan for the future. The book draws from research in biology, psychology, and economics to make the case that humans can better plan for the future by adopting certain practices. It was named a top book by The Financial Times and a best book of the year by National Public Radio.

Venkataraman has also appeared on the TED mainstage and the Aspen Ideas Festival. She gave the 2021 commencement address at the University of Southern California.

The Washington Post announced that Venkataraman would join the newspaper "as a columnist to write about the future" in December 2022.

== Selected works ==
- The Optimist's Telescope: Thinking Ahead in a Reckless Age (Aug 2019) ISBN 9780735219472
- "Why we still need climate optimism" (Sep 19, 2019) The Washington Post
- "Challenge for a Reckless Age: Be Better Ancestors" (Sept 23, 2019) Grist

== Awards and honors ==
- Global Young Leader, French-American Foundation (2015)
- Honorary Doctorate of Humane Letters, University of Southern California (2022)
