= The Emancipator (website) =

21st century newspaper

- Founder(s): Ibram X. Kendi and Bina Venkataraman
- Publisher: Howard University
- Editor-in-chief: Ibram X. Kendi
- Managing editor: Halimah Abdullah
- Founded: April 2022; 4 years ago
- Relaunched: July 2, 2026
- Headquarters: Washington, D.C.
- Website: theemancipator.org

The Emancipator is an online newspaper on topics of racial justice, co-founded by Ibram X. Kendi of Boston University and Bina Venkataraman of The Boston Globe.

== History ==
Ibram X. Kendi and Bina Venkataraman, then with Boston University and The Boston Globe, respectively, met during the 2020 American protests for racial justice and shared a mutual interest in Boston's 19th-century abolitionist newspapers. They discussed William Lloyd Garrison's The Liberator and what a contemporary iteration would be like, modeled on Garrison's urgency and anti-gradualist approach to abolition.

In 2021, they began to assemble an online newspaper on the model of CBS's The 19th. They received a budget from their institutions and sought new individual and foundation donors. The name "The Liberator" had already been trademarked by a Christian nonprofit, so Kendi and Venkataraman chose "The Emancipator" based on another 19th-century abolitionist newspaper.

The Emancipator was launched in April 2022, with journalists Deborah D. Douglas and Amber Payne as co-editors-in-chief.

The Globe's involvement ended in March 2023. Venkataraman left the Globe shortly thereafter. The publication expanded its coverage into cultural analysis, earning recognition and awards for its work in that area. Kendi's departure from Boston University was announced in January 2025. Amber Payne stepped down as publisher in June 2025.

The outlet relocated to Howard University in the fall of 2025 and relaunched in July 2026. The relaunch included an expansion into investigative and breaking news coverage, the addition of staff correspondents, and growth in the publication’s web and social media audiences. Kendi serves as editor-in-chief alongside Managing Editor Halimah Abdullah, an award-winning journalist whose career includes leading political and government coverage at NBC, ABC and NPR.
