= Journal of Communication Inquiry =

- Discipline: Mass Communication
- Language: English
- Edited by: Thomas P. Oates

Publication details
- History: 1974-present
- Publisher: SAGE Publishing
- Frequency: Quarterly

Standard abbreviations
- ISO 4: J. Commun. Inq.

Indexing
- ISSN: 0196-8599 (print); 1552-4612 (web)
- LCCN: 80640370
- OCLC no.: 38525916

Links
- Journal homepage; Online access; Online archive

Journal of Communication Inquiry is a quarterly peer-reviewed academic journal that covers the field of communication. It is edited by graduate students in the School of Journalism and Mass Communication at the University of Iowa. The editor is Thomas P. Oates (University of Iowa). It was established in 1974 and is currently published by SAGE Publishing.

== Abstracting and indexing ==
Journal of Communication Inquiry is abstracted and indexed in:

- ComAbstracts
- EBSCO databases
- Gale Diversity Studies Collection
- Peace Research Abstracts Journal
- ProQuest
- Scopus
- Wilson Humanities Index/Abstracts
