= Stamped from the Beginning =

2016 book by Ibram X. Kendi

Stamped from the Beginning: The Definitive History of Racist Ideas in America
- Author: Ibram X. Kendi
- Language: English
- Subject: Racism in the United States
- Genre: Non-fiction
- Published: 2016
- Publisher: Nation Books
- Publication place: United States
- Pages: 582 pp
- Awards: National Book Award for Nonfiction (2016)
- Text: Stamped from the Beginning: The Definitive History of Racist Ideas in America at Internet Archive

Stamped from the Beginning: The Definitive History of Racist Ideas in America is a non-fiction book about race in the United States by the American historian Ibram X. Kendi, published April 12, 2016 by Bold Type Books, an imprint of PublicAffairs. The book won the National Book Award for Nonfiction.

The book also has two "remixes" for children, Stamped: Racism, Antiracism, and You and Stamped (for Kids): Racism, Antiracism, and You. A graphic novel version, adapted and illustrated by Joel Christian Gill, was published in June 2023.

== Critical reception ==
Stamped from the Beginning was generally well-received by critics, including a starred review from Kirkus Reviews, who called the book "ambitious" and "magisterial."

Library Journal's Thomas J. Davis concluded that Stamped from the Beginning "is a must for serious readers of American history, politics, or social thought."

The Guardian's David Olusoga called the book "brilliant and disturbing" and explained that some readers find the book disturbing "because of the author’s fearless reappraisals of the words, actions and philosophies of some of the more revered heroes of American abolitionism and civil rights – including African American heroes," including William Lloyd Garrison and W. E. B. Du Bois. He further states, "Perhaps what is most disturbing about Kendi’s work is that it shows how the same racial ideas, dressed in different period costumes, have been repeatedly used to explain away the deaths of generations of African Americans, slaves, victims of Jim Crow lynchings and, in the 21st-century, casualties of police shootings."

Also writing for The Guardian, Mark Anthony Neal writes, "I can't say whether Ibram X Kendi's Stamped from the Beginning will offend most white people (though I'm willing to bet it will offend some), but he damn sure names white supremacy for what it is."

Sadiah Qureshi, writing for New Statesman, referred to the book as "a lucid, accessible survey of how 'the people' were racialised over 500 years." She further stated, "One might expect Kendi to be despondent, but he believes that eradicating discriminatory policies will consign racist ideas to the past ... an un-yielding narrative of racist ideas, violence and harm. However, the book is also a history of refusals."

Booklist's Rebecca Vnuk commented on Kendi's writing, highlighting how the book is "heavily researched yet easily readable." She further explains, "The hope here is that by studying and remembering the lessons of history, we may be able to move forward to an equitable society."

The Washington Post's Carlos Lozada provided a mixed review, writing, "The greatest service Kendi and provide[s] is the ruthless prosecution of American ideas about race for their tensions, contradictions and unintended consequences. And yet I have greater difficulty embracing the notion that, as Kendi argues, progress on race is inevitably stalked by the advance of racism and that, on an individual level, falling short in specific instances somehow taints the whole of a person ... The old one-drop rule for determining race was based on prejudice and pseudoscience. A one-drop rule for determining racism seems only slightly less unfair, no matter how well-intentioned."

Political scientist and activist Norman Finkelstein locates the book within Kendi's broader body of work, which he describes as "fatuous, almost juvenile," dependent upon "binary, wooden labels" in the absence of a critical framework, "more fashion statement than political manifesto," and frequently "bizarre."

== Awards and honors ==
Kirkus Reviews named Stamped from the Beginning one of the best books of 2016.

Awards for Stamped from the Beginning
Year	Award		Result	Ref.
2016	National Book Award	Nonfiction	Won	
2016	National Book Critics Circle Award	General Nonfiction	Shortlisted	
2017	Hurston/Wright Legacy Award	Nonfiction	Shortlisted	
2017	NAACP Image Award	Nonfiction	Shortlisted	
2024	The Cinema for Peace Dove for Justice		Nominated	

== Stamped: Racism, Antiracism, and You ==
Stamped: Racism, Antiracism, and You
- First edition cover of Stamped
- Author: Ibram X. Kendi and Jason Reynolds
- Language: English
- Subject: Racism in the United States
- Genre: Non-fiction
- Publisher: Little, Brown Books for Young Readers
- Publication date: March 10, 2020
- Publication place: United States
- Pages: 294
- Awards: Goodreads Choice Award (2020); Cybils Award (2020)
- ISBN: 978-0-3164-5369-1 Hardcover

Kendi wrote Stamped: Racism, Antiracism, and You with Jason Reynolds, "remixing" Stamped from the Beginning for a younger audience. The book was published March 10, 2020 by Little, Brown Books for Young Readers.

=== Origins ===
Stamped: Racism, Antiracism, and You is adapted from Stamped: From the Beginning, originally written by Kendi. The first book, published in 2016, focuses on historical figures. However, Stamped: Racism, Antiracism, and You follows a chronological format. Kendi reached out to Reynolds to collaborate on a chronological version after seeing success with his first book. Reynolds first declined Kendi's proposal, adamant that he was a fiction writer. It took a writing style that made Stamped "not a history book" to get Reynolds on board with the idea.

=== Structure ===
Kendi and Reynolds insist throughout the book that "it is not a history book" and writes in a casual, easy-to-understand manner, using slang and pop culture references to cater to the younger audience. There are five sections split by time periods: 1415–1728, 1743–1826, 1826–1879, 1868–1963, and 1963-today. The chapters vary in length and there are 28 in total. In these chapters, Kendi and Reynolds focus on important, often overlooked figures and events to illustrate the development of racist ideas throughout the history of the United States. Throughout the book, Kendi and Reynolds return to the themes of racists, assimilationists, and antiracists, and the book ends by encouraging readers to take what they have learned from the book and to become antiracist.

=== Critical reception ===
Stamped received numerous positive reviews, including starred reviews from Booklist, Kirkus Reviews, and Publishers Weekly.

Kirkus Reviews called the book "impressive and much needed."

Publishers Weekly comments on the book's writing style, stating, "Short chapters, lively phrasing..., and intentional breaks ... help maintain a brisk, compelling pace. Told impressively economically, loaded with historical details that connect clearly to current experiences, and bolstered with suggested reading and listening selected specifically for young readers, Kendi and Reynolds’s volume is essential, meaningfully accessible reading."

Booklist's Jessica Agudel wrote that the book's encouragement of readers to "emerge as critical thinkers who can decipher coded language and harmful imagery stemming from racist ideas, which still linger in modern society and popular culture, will be the most empowering result." She concludes that Stamped should be "required reading for everyone especially those invested in the future of" young people in America."

Shelf Awareness's Siân Gaetano highlights how "Reynolds.. makes Stamped a conversation with the reader," saying, "This approach, in less capable hands, could go horribly wrong ... But it is what makes Reynolds's interpretation so successful. Stamped is approachable: his tone is welcoming, helpful, easygoing and informal, even though--because--his topic is the shameful, disgusting and brutal history and present of racism."

The audiobook edition, narrated by Jason Reynolds, also received a starred review from Booklist's Terry Hong, who stated, Stamped—both printed and aural—is an undeniable gift to lucky audiences; either/both must be required reading for all. Hong also highlighted how Reynolds "transform[ed Kendi's] illuminating words into something akin to a riveting open-mic, poetry-slam performance," stating, "Listeners’ heads will undoubtedly be bobbing in absorbed agreement." Hong's "only complaint throughout" are "the between-chapter gameshow-esque cacophonous interruptions."

=== Awards and honors ===
Stamped was a New York Times Bestseller. Kirkus Reviews named it one of the best books of 2020.

Awards for Stamped
Year	Award	Category	Result	Ref.
2019	Kirkus Prize	—	Shortlisted	
2020	Barnes & Noble Book of the Year Award	—	Shortlisted	
2020	Booklist Editors' Choice	Books for Youth	Selection	
2020	Booklist Editors' Choice	Youth Audio	Selection	
2020	Cybils Award	Senior High Nonfiction	Won	
2020	Goodreads Choice Awards	Nonfiction	Won	
2021	ALSC Notable Children's Books	—	Selection	
2021	ALSC Notable Children's Recordings	—	Selection	
2021	Amazing Audiobooks for Young Adults	—	Top 10	
2021	NAACP Image Award	Teens	Shortlisted	
2021	Odyssey Award	—	Honor	

=== Censorship ===
In 2020, Stamped landed the second position on the American Library Association's list of the most commonly banned and challenged books in the United States. The book was banned, challenged, and/or restricted "because of author’s public statements, and because of claims that the book contains 'selective storytelling incidents' and does not encompass racism against all people."

== Stamped (for Kids): Racism, Antiracism, and You ==
Stamped (for Kids): Racism, Antiracism, and You
- First edition cover of Stamped (for Kids)
- Author: Sonja Cherry-Paul, Ibram X. Kendi, and Jason Reynolds
- Illustrators: Rachelle Baker
- Language: English
- Subject: Racism in the United States
- Genre: Non-fiction
- Publisher: Little, Brown Books for Young Readers
- Publication date: May 11, 2021
- Publication place: United States
- Pages: 163

Stamped (for Kids): Racism, Antiracism, and You was published May 11, 2021 by Little, Brown Young Readers. The book was written by Ibram X. Kendi and Jason Reynolds, illustrated by Rachelle Baker, and adapted by Sonja Cherry-Paul.

=== Critical reception ===
Stamped (for Kids) received a starred review from Kirkus Reviews, who called the books "exhilarating, excellent, [and] necessary."

Booklist's Jessica Agudelo highlighted how Cherry-Paul "skillfully carried over" the "conservational tone" created in the previous installments of the book. She also discussed the book's artistry, saying, "Baker’s gray-scale illustrations provide an effective visual language for the intended audience and are featured varyingly as spot art and full-page depictions."

Common Sense Media gave Stamped (for Kids) three out of five stars, who noted that the book's concepts and language "[seem] inaccessible to 6- to 8-year-old children at the younger end of the publisher's target audience." They explain their position by stating, "The content veers between young-kid-friendly discussions ... to very adult-oriented, abstract language and concepts."

=== Awards and honors ===
Stamped (for Kids) is a New York Times Bestseller. Kirkus Reviews named it one of the best books of 2021. In 2022, the Association for Library Service to Children included it on their "Notable Children's Books" list.

== Stamped from the Beginning: A Graphic History of Racist Ideas in America ==
Stamped from the Beginning: A Graphic History of Racist Ideas in America
- First edition cover of the graphic edition of Stamped from the Beginning
- Author: Ibram X. Kendi, and Joel Christian Gill
- Language: English
- Subject: Racism in the United States
- Genre: Non-fiction
- Publisher: Ten Speed Press
- Publication date: June 6, 2023
- Publication place: United States
- Pages: 288
- ISBN: 978-1-9848-5943-3 First edition

Stamped from the Beginning: A Graphic History of Racist Ideas in America, adapted to graphic novel form by Joel Christian Gill, was published June 6, 2023.

A documentary film by Roger Ross Williams was also submitted for Oscar consideration.
