= Larry Smith (editor) =

American author and publisher (born 1968)

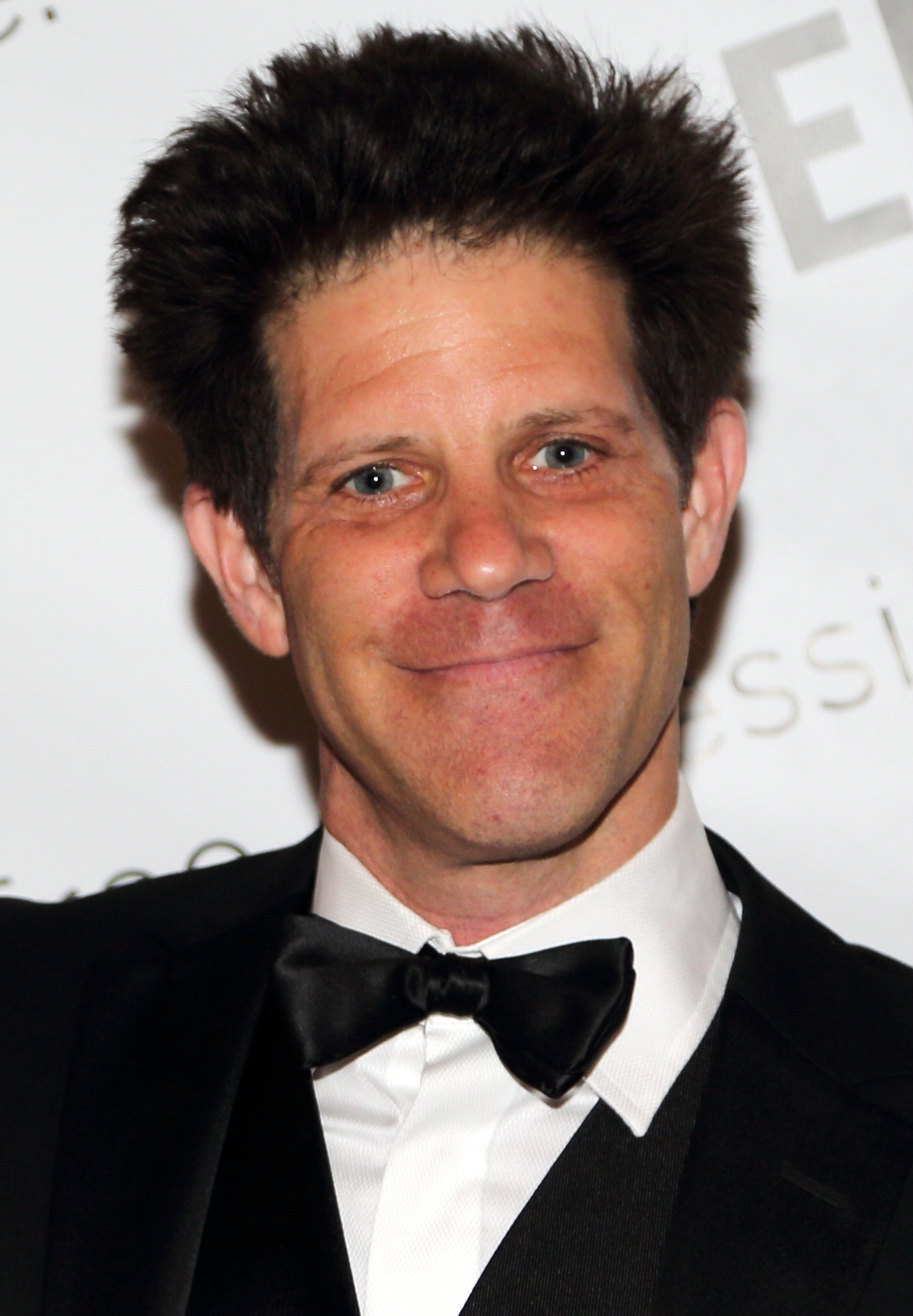
- Larry Smith
- Born: September 17, 1968 (age 58); New Jersey
- Education: University of Pennsylvania
- Occupations: Non-fiction writer, editor
- Spouse: Piper Kerman (m. 2006)
- Writing career
- Genre: Six-Word Memoirs
- Notable works: "Not Quite What I Was Planning", "Six-Word Memoirs on Love & Heartbreak"

Larry Smith (born September 17, 1968) is an American author and editor, and publisher of Smith Magazine. He is best known for developing the best-selling book series Six-Word Memoirs, a literary subgenre that took on a life of its own in popular culture as publications began holding reader contests and publishing the results. The form has been described as "American haiku." Smith credits the short story, "For sale: baby shoes, never worn", with inspiring the viral literary movement.

== Background and early career ==
Smith grew up in New Jersey, the son of Burlington attorney Louis Smith and Carol, a clinical social worker. He graduated from the University of Pennsylvania.

He worked as a founding editor of the magazine P.O.V. and editor-in-chief of its sister publication, Egg, as well as an editor of Might magazine with Dave Eggers. Smith was also managing editor of the news service AlterNet and editor of the city guide network, Boulevards.

Smith also worked as executive editor of Yahoo! Internet Life, editor at ESPN The Magazine, and articles editor at Men's Journal. His writing has appeared in The New York Times, Popular Science, Men’s Health, Salon, Slate, as well as other places.

In 2004, Smith's then-fiancée, Piper Kerman, served a 13-month sentence at the Federal Correctional Institution, Danbury, Connecticut, the result of a 1998 arrest for drug-related offenses committed about five years prior. Smith visited her in prison almost every week, and wrote about the experience in The New York Times. Kerman later wrote a memoir about the experience, Orange Is the New Black: My Year in a Women's Prison, which was subsequently made into a television show by Netflix productions, in which Smith's homologue ("Larry Bloom") is played by Jason Biggs.

== Smith Magazine and "Six Word Memoirs" ==
On January 6, 2006, National Smith Day, Smith co-founded the online Smith Magazine with Tim Barkow.

Two years later, Smith's book, Not Quite What I Was Planning: Six-Word Memoirs by Writers Famous and Obscure, co-edited by Rachel Fershleiser, was selected as a Top 100 Editors' Pick by Amazon in 2008 and became a New York Times bestseller. Smith and Fershleiser went on to co-edit three more books in the series, including Six-Word Memoirs on Love & Heartbreak, I Can't Keep My Own Secrets: Six-Word Memoirs by Teens Famous & Obscure, and It All Changed in an Instant: More Six-Word Memoirs by Teens Famous & Obscure, all published by Harper Perennial.

== Books ==
- Not Quite What I Was Planning: Six-Word Memoirs by Writers Famous and Obscure (with Rachel Fershleiser.) Harper Perennial, 2008. ISBN 978-0-06-137405-0.
- Not Quite What I Was Planning: Six-Word Memoirs by Writers Famous & Obscure—Deluxe Edition (with Rachel Fershleiser). Harper Perennial, 2008. ISBN 978-0-06-171371-2.
- Six Word Memoirs on Love & Heartbreak: by Writers Famous and Obscure (with Rachel Fershleiser.) Harper Perennial, January 2009. ISBN 978-0-06-171462-7.
- I Can't Keep My Own Secrets: Six-Word Memoirs by Teens Famous & Obscure (with Rachel Fershleiser). Harper Teen, September 2009. ISBN 978-0-06-172684-2.
- It All Changed in an Instant: More Six-Word Memoirs by Teens Famous & Obscure (with Rachel Fershleiser). Harper Perennial, January 2010. ISBN 978-0-06-171943-1.
- The Best Advice in Six Words. St. Martin's Press, November 2015. ISBN 978-1-25-006701-2
