= Smith Magazine =

Online magazIne

- Website type: Online Magazine, Liberal (mostly)
- Owners: Magsmith, LLC
- Creators: Larry Smith, Tim Barkow
- Website: www.smithmag.net
- Launched: 2006
- Current status: active

Smith Magazine is a U.S.-based online magazine devoted to storytelling in all its forms. Smith's content is participatory in nature, and the magazine welcomes contributions from all its readers. The magazine has made a name for itself with its original graphic novel projects Shooting War, A.D.: New Orleans After the Deluge, and Next Door Neighbor; and with its series of Six-Word Memoirs projects. Most of these projects have since gone from web to print publication, from such publishers as HarperCollins, Pantheon, and Grand Central Publishing.

== History ==
Smith was founded January 6, 2006 — National Smith Day — by writer/editor Larry Smith and designer Tim Barkow. Previous to launching Smith, Larry Smith was articles editor of Men's Journal, and has been the executive editor of Yahoo! Internet Life, and senior editor at ESPN Magazine, and a founding editor of P.O.V. and Might magazines. Tim Barkow is a former editor at Wired and the online general manager at Portland Monthly.

The site focuses on "personal media": blogs, memoirs, diaries, viral videos, social networks, "the mash-up between the professional and the amateur, and art projects rooted in personal. It's all about the highly personal take on everything." Since its 2006 launch, Smith has been heralded as "a vision for the future of populist storytelling," "a gigantic cocktail party to which everyone is invited to come, listen, and contribute their own personal stories," and "the pulse of today's cultural narrative."

In the spring of 2006, Smith launched the critically acclaimed webcomic Shooting War, which became a full-color graphic novel from Grand Central Publishing in the fall of 2007.

In January 2007, Smith launched its second webcomic, a true story of Hurricane Katrina called A.D.: New Orleans After the Deluge. New chapters appeared monthly on Smith through the summer of 2008. A.D. received coverage in the New Orleans Times-Picayune, the Los Angeles Times, the Atlanta Journal-Constitution, the Toronto Star, Rolling Stone, AlterNet, Boing Boing, Wired.com, the USA Today blog "Pop Candy," and NPR, as well as hundreds of blogs. A four-color hardcover book edition of A.D. was published by Pantheon Books in August 2009.

In February 2008, Harper Perennial published the New York Times bestseller Not Quite What I Was Planning: Six-Word Memoirs By Writers Famous and Obscure, which came from a six-word memoir contest held on Smith (and co-sponsored by Twitter) in 2007. Not Quite What I Was Planning collects almost 1,000 six-word memoirs, including pieces from celebrities like Stephen Colbert, Jane Goodall, Dave Eggers, and more. Vanity Fair magazine wrote that Not Quite What I Was Planning "will thrill minimalists and inspire maximalists," while Publishers Weekly said it made for "compulsive reading and prove arguably as insightful as any 300+-page biography."

== Story projects ==
=== Six-Word Memoirs ===
The Six-Word Memoir project was the first in a series of several "Six-Word" reader driven projects on the SMITH Magazine website. Six-Word Memoirs are simple stories told in exactly six words that describe anything from the mundane details of someone's childhood to the most private events in a romantic relationship. For example, Six-Word Memoirs book series editors Larry Smith (editor) and Rachel Fershleiser's six-word memoirs are, respectively, "Big hair, big heart, big hurry" and "Bespectacled, besneakered, read and ran around."

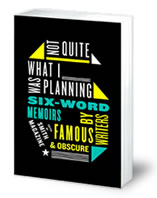
Six-Word Memoir Book Cover

In an interview with Adam Phillips of VOA News and the online audio program "Wordmaster," Rachel Fershleiser defines a "memoir" as the following:

A memoir is any story that encapsulates your life, what you remember, what's important to you. And that's why this six-word form is so wonderful, because it helps you distill what's really important. Some people choose to encompass everything. So if you look at the title of the book, Not Quite What I Was Planning — which was a six-word memoir — that can pretty much apply to a whole life and almost anyone's life.

Larry Smith followed up by defining "memoir" in his words:

He's saying you know, I got a bad deal, life is cruel. In the same moment, I'm laughing. I'm smirking at it. And that's the thing about the six-word memoir form: you really can look at a specific moment that may have affected your whole life. For example: Paul Bellows — like most of our contributors, an unknown person that came through our site. His six-word memoir: 'Never should have bought that ring.' That tells a whole story about a moment in his life and about a life regret.

This project spawned a book collection of Six-Word Memoirs. The book, Not Quite What I Was Planning: Six-Word Memoirs by Writers Famous & Obscure is the first in the Six-Word Memoir series.

Editors Smith & Fershleiser traveled around the country in 2008 on a Six-Word Memoir book and promotional tour.

=== Six-Word Memoirs on Love & Heartbreak ===
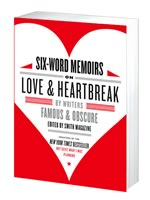
Love & Heartbreak book cover.

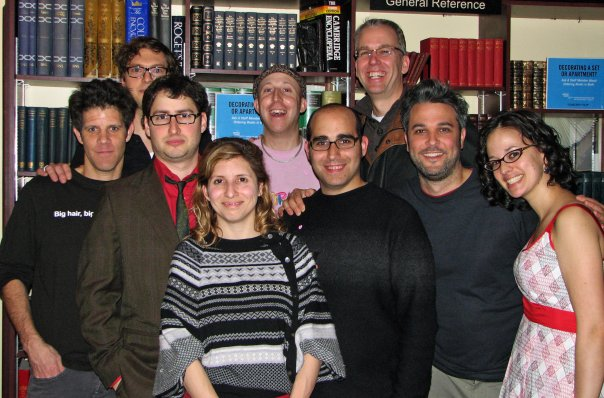
Photo from The Valentine's Day Personal Media Mixer & Confessional Culture Variety Show with the hosts, including Larry Smith and Fershleiser.

Similar to the first six-word reader project, the Six-Word Memoirs on Love & Heartbreak project asked readers to reveal their most intimate six words on the loves of their lives.

The Love & Heartbreak projected culminated in a book which SMITH Magazine touted as a "roller-coaster ride through the complexities of the human heart." The book launched a book tour, and in 2009, Smith and Fershleiser traveled around the country promoting the new, second book and the Six-Word Memoir phenomenon. SMITH Magazine created a video to illustrate the memoirs collected for the Love & Heartbreak book. The video was played on the book tour and can also be found online.

==== Love & Heartbreak event ====
In February 2009, Smith Magazine, along with several other websites/magazines, hosted a special event: "The Valentine's Day Personal Media Mixer & Confessional Culture Variety Show." PostSecret, Found Magazine, Mortified, and Cassette From My Ex joined SMITH for an evening of storytelling, singing, and multimedia projects.

=== Six-Word Memoirs for Teens ===
In 2008, Smith Magazine launched SMITH Teens, the only Six-Word project with a devoted website. It provides heightened reader interaction and Six-Word Memoir creation. Like the other Six-Word Memoir projects, SMITH Teens transformed into a collection of Six-Word Memoirs; this time all by teens (ages 13–19), and will be released as a book in late 2009.

The Smith Teens site has several features that are regularly used by SMITH teen-readers. The WordCloud, which is a collection of words on one page that link to a list of Six-Word Memoirs that reference the clicked word. Featured entries, which highlights the best of the teen Six-Word Memoirs. Lastly, the SMITH Teens site has a blog devoted to teen Six-Word Memoir news on the Internet and in the media.

=== Six Words on The Green Life ===
Six Words on The Green Life was a SMITH six-word story contest. Smith partnered with eco-website TreeHugger, the leading media outlet dedicated to driving sustainability mainstream, to bring SMITH readers a six-word project/contest based on "The Green Life." This theme was generally interpreted as a chance to describe one's views on living green, and their experiences with this lifestyle.

The contest has ended, but the story project page is still open for submissions.

=== Six-Word Memoirs ===
In 2008, Smith Magazine held a Six-Word Momoir contest leading up to Mother's Day. Smith partnered with shopping site Delight.com to offer a $50 gift certificate for each of the three winners.

The three winning entries were: "Mommy's boobies no longer Daddy's boobies," by Jessica Blankton; "Suffered miscarriage. Daughter offered her doll," by Tara Lazar; and "Can I pee in private, please?" by Sheryl Stein.

In 2009, Smith Magazine held another Six-Word Momoir contest, this time partnering with the websites truuconfessions and Postcards from Yo Momma. Winners received signed copies of three books from the partners and SMITH; three-runners up won one book of their choice. This contest closed on May 10, 2009.

Nancy Lenox won with "Two children. Accidents, but not mistakes." For the MOMoir About Your Own Mom, the top choice was "Screw cancer. Mom went to Paris," by Leslie Constans.

=== Six-Word Memoirs on The Food Life ===
Smith Magazine and food media website Chow challenged readers to define their food life in the Six-Word Memoir format. Winners of this contest won a Six-Word Memoir book, and a personalized iPod nano.

Runners-up:

"It's not that kind of diet." (Alison Carey) "Egg cream is a dirty lie." (Marcia Gaye) "About that fire in the kitchen..." (Lauran Strait) "Coffee, like love, is bitterly addictive" (Laurie Schmidt) "It's best just to eat it." (Patti Williams)

Winner:

"Are you going to eat that?" Nancy Elliot

=== Six Words for America ===
In 2008, Smith Magazine and the National Constitution Center asked readers to help then-President-elect Barack Obama inspire America. SMITH asked readers to use six words to give him guidance, offer ideas for his inaugural address, or share six memorable words for January 20 and beyond.

Six contest winners were chosen and won a Six-Word Memoir book, and a one year's membership to the National Constitution Center. One grand-prize winner also won a leather bound volume of the United States Constitution.

=== My Life So Far ===
This is an ongoing Smith reader project that invites writers to share their memoirs-in-progress or a personal essay.

=== My Ex ===
This is an ongoing Smith reader project that invites writers to share their stories about ex-boyfriends/girlfriends/lovers.

=== Brushes With Fame ===
This is an ongoing Smith reader project that invites writers to share their stories about unexpectedly running into celebrities.

== Editor's projects ==
=== Editor's Blog ===
This is a Smith team-run blog. The Editor's Blog is a place for the Smith team to post Smith news and other miscellaneous information about the writing world.

=== Memoirville ===
This is a blog run by Smith editors and guest interviewers. Memoirville is dedicated to new memoirs by famous writers, and newly published authors.

== Webcomics ==
=== The Pekar Project ===
SMITH comics editor Jeff Newelt edited The Pekar Project, featuring new work by Harvey Pekar, illustrated by a collection of different artists. The series ran on SMITH in 2009–2010.

=== Next Door Neighbor ===
SMITH published the weekly anthology series Next Door Neighbor in 2008–2009, edited by Dean Haspiel. Contributors included Jonathan Ames, Nick Bertozzi, Josh Neufeld, and Harvey Pekar and Ed Piskor.

=== My Home Birth ===
My Home Birth was a graphic memoir created by Christen Clifford and drawn by David Heatley, published on SMITH in 2009. It documents Clifford's experience with giving birth to her daughter, Vera, at home.

=== Graphic Therapy ===
Graphic Therapy: Notes from the Gap Years was the illustrated diary of single Jewish artist Emily Steinberg making her own way through life, work, and psychoanalysis. It appeared on SMITH in 2008–2009.

=== A.D. New Orleans After the Deluge ===
A.D. was published on SMITH in 2007–2008. A true story from cartoonist Josh Neufeld, it tells the story of Hurricane Katrina and its aftermath from the perspective of real people from New Orleans still dealing with the storm each and every day. A two-part prologue sets the scene and shows the storm, almost like a silent movie. This was followed by 13 chapters and an epilogue taking readers through the storm, its aftermath, and the rebuilding of New Orleans. A.D. is a nonfiction graphic novel, a new approach to storytelling, and a multifaceted peek into the personal tales emerging from the storm of the century. A.D. was expanded and published as a hardcover book by Pantheon in August 2009.

=== Shooting War ===
Shooting War began as a serialized webcomic by Anthony Lappé and Dan Goldman on Smith in May 2006. It was released online as a short series, but eventually turned into an 11 biweekly chapters as reader and media interest grew. In the fall of 2006, the story was acquired by Grand Central Publishing for publication as a hardcover graphic novel in North America, and in the U.K. by Weidenfeld & Nicolson. The full-color 192-page hardcover graphic novel tells a story of the future of war, terrorism, and journalism.

== Books published ==
- Lappé, Anthony, and Goldman, Dan. Shooting War. Grand Central Publishing, 2007. ISBN 978-0-446-58120-2.
- Smith, Larry, and Fershleiser, Rachel. Not Quite What I Was Planning: Six-Word Memoirs by Writers Famous and Obscure. Harper Perennial, 2008. ISBN 978-0-06-137405-0.
- Smith, Larry, and Fershleiser, Rachel. Not Quite What I Was Planning: Six-Word Memoirs by Writers Famous & Obscure—Deluxe Edition. Harper Perennial, 2008. ISBN 978-0-06-171371-2.
- Smith, Larry, and Fershleiser, Rachel. Six Word Memoirs on Love & Heartbreak: by Writers Famous and Obscure. Harper Perennial, January 2009. ISBN 978-0-06-171462-7.
- Neufeld, Josh. A.D.: New Orleans After the Deluge Pantheon Graphic Novels, August 2009. ISBN 978-0-307-37814-9.
- Smith, Larry, and Fershleiser, Rachel. I Can't Keep My Own Secrets: Six-Word Memoirs by Teens Famous & Obscure. Harper Teen, September 2009. ISBN 978-0-06-172684-2.
