= John Blumenthal =

American novelist and screenwriter

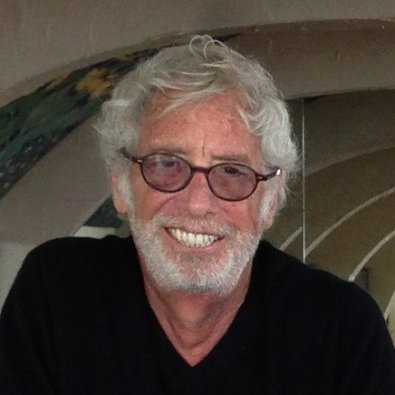
- Born: 1949 (age 76–77); Middletown, Orange County, New York, U.S.
- Education: Tufts University
- Occupation: Writer
- Writing career
- Period: 1984–present
- Genres: Fiction, nonfiction, screenwriting

John Blumenthal (born 1949) is an American novelist and screenwriter, known for co-writing the screenplays for the films Short Time and Blue Streak.

== Early life and education ==
Blumenthal was born in Middletown, New York. He attended Tufts University, graduating in 1971.

== Career ==
=== Early work in magazines ===
Blumenthal was hired as a fact-checker at Esquire magazine in the early 1970s, when he has 24. His first editorial job, he served under the editor Harold Hayes. In 1973, Nora Ephron, at the time an Esquire columnist, helped Blumenthal get a job at Playboy as an editor and writer. In addition to Esquire and Playboy, Blumenthal has also written for Salon.

=== Novels and nonfiction ===
Several of Blumenthal's books have been loosely based on his experiences in Hollywood, including the 1984 parody The Official Hollywood Handbook. Also in 1984, Blumenthal and his friend and fellow Playboy editor Barry Golson wrote a period-piece romance novella spoof called Love's Reckless Rash, published by St. Martin's Press under the pen name Rosemary Cartwheel. In 2013, the duo wrote Passing Wind of Love, a novel-length expansion of Love's Reckless Rash.

Blumenthal wrote a pair of detective novel spoofs published by Simon & Schuster in 1985, both featuring private detective Mac Slade and set in modern-day Manhattan: The Tinseltown Murders and The Case of the Hardboiled Dicks.

Blumenthal's 1988 nonfiction book Hollywood High is a history of the Los Angeles public high school founded in 1903 that was attended by numerous celebrities, including Lana Turner, Mickey Rooney, Judy Garland, John Ritter and Carol Burnett.

In 1999, Blumenthal returned to literature with the comic novel What's Wrong With Dorfman? His agent sent it to about 20 publishers; it was rejected by all of them, and in 2000 Blumenthal decided to self-publish. In 2002 St. Martin's Press bought the book, republishing it the following year. The novel is about the midlife crisis of Hollywood screenwriter and hypochondriac Martin Dorfman, as he faces up to painful childhood memories and deals with a variety of physical ailments and professional setbacks. The Wall Street Journal called it "a funny and surprisingly moving story written at the intersection of shtick and angst", and Publishers Weekly described it as "frequently hilarious and unexpectedly touching." It was named one of January Magazine's favorite books of the year for 2000.

Blumenthal's 2004 comic novel Millard Fillmore, Mon Amour was also published by St. Martin's. The book's central character, Plato G. Fussell, obsesses over writing a 10-volume definitive biography of Millard Fillmore, the 13th President of the United States. Fussell is a death-obsessed dysfunctional divorced wealthy loner who engages in a relationship with his psychoanalyst's wife after his first wife leaves him.

His 2011 novel Three and a Half Virgins is also about a man whose wife leaves him: newly single Jimmy Hendricks is a lonely, middle-aged man revisiting his past by looking up his old girlfriends.

=== Screenwriting ===
Blumenthal co-wrote the 1990 action comedy Short Time, directed by Gregg Champion and starring Dabney Coleman and Teri Garr, and the 1999 action comedy film Blue Streak, directed by Les Mayfield and starring Martin Lawrence. Blue Streak brought in over $117 million at the box office worldwide.

== Personal life ==
Blumenthal is married with two daughters.

== Bibliography ==
=== Novels ===
- The Official Hollywood Handbook (1984, Pocket Books)
- Love's Reckless Rash (as Rosemary Cartwheel; co-authored with Barry Golson) (1984, St. Martin's Press)
- Mac Slade Private Dick: The Tinseltown Murders (1985, Simon & Schuster)
- Mac Slade: The Case of the Hardboiled Dicks (1985, Simon & Schuster)
- What's Wrong with Dorfman? (2000, Farmer Street Press / 2003, St. Martin's Press)
- Millard Fillmore, Mon Amour (2004, St. Martin's Press)
- Three and a Half Virgins (2011, Farmer Street Press)
- Passing Wind of Love (as Rosemary Cartwheel; co-authored with Barry Golson) (2013)

=== Nonfiction ===
- Hollywood High: The History of America's Most Famous Public School (1988, Ballantine Books)

=== Screenplays ===
- Short Time (1990, 20th Century Fox)
- Blue Streak (1999, Columbia Pictures)

=== Television scripts ===
- Simon & Simon (1988, CBS, season 8, episode 2)
