= Golson =

Golson is a surname. Notable people with the surname include:

- Barry Golson, American journalist
- Benny Golson, American musician
- Everett Golson, American football player
- Greg Golson, American baseball player
- Jack Golson, British archaeologist

== Other ==
- 2466 Golson, an asteroid
