= Digital Blasphemy =

Website

- Website type: Digital wallpapers
- Available in: English
- Owner: Ryan Bliss
- Website: digitalblasphemy.com
- Commercial: Yes
- Registration: Required for premium content

Digital Blasphemy is a commercial website for computer wallpapers, designed and created by independent Computer-generated imagery artist Ryan Bliss, an English and Computer Science graduate from the University of Iowa. The name Digital Blasphemy was chosen because of the "Godlike" feeling Bliss experienced when creating worlds through artwork.

The site is subscription-based, but a free gallery is available to non-members. Images in the free gallery are rotated regularly with fresh images and are presented in various screen resolutions.

== Designs ==
Typical designs include science fiction and fantasy, space imagery, planetscapes, landscapes, cityscapes, seascapes, underwater scenes, interiors, abstracts, and fractals. There are also images depicting seasons and seasonal events, special occasions, and holidays such as Halloween, Christmas, the Fourth of July, Saint Patrick's Day, and Valentine's Day.

Wallpapers come in many display resolutions up to 7680 x 1600, including widescreen and multi-monitor formats to accommodate various monitor configurations. Only subscribers have access to the highest-resolution wallpapers. As of July 2007, many wallpapers were converted to display on mobile devices, such as cell phones and tablets, and the first 1080p animated wallpaper was created.

Digital Blasphemy wallpapers were used in Stardock's weather product, The Natural Desktop.

== Reception ==
Digital Blasphemy's work has been recommended by Lifehacker, PC World, Yahoo! Internet Life, and the G4TV television show The Screen Savers. In January 2012 Digital Blasphemy was named "The Most Popular Wallpaper Website" by readers of Lifehacker.com.

At the height of its popularity, Digital Blasphemy's most popular works included Tropic of Cancer and Tropic of Capricorn.
