= Piper Kerman =

American author (born 1969)

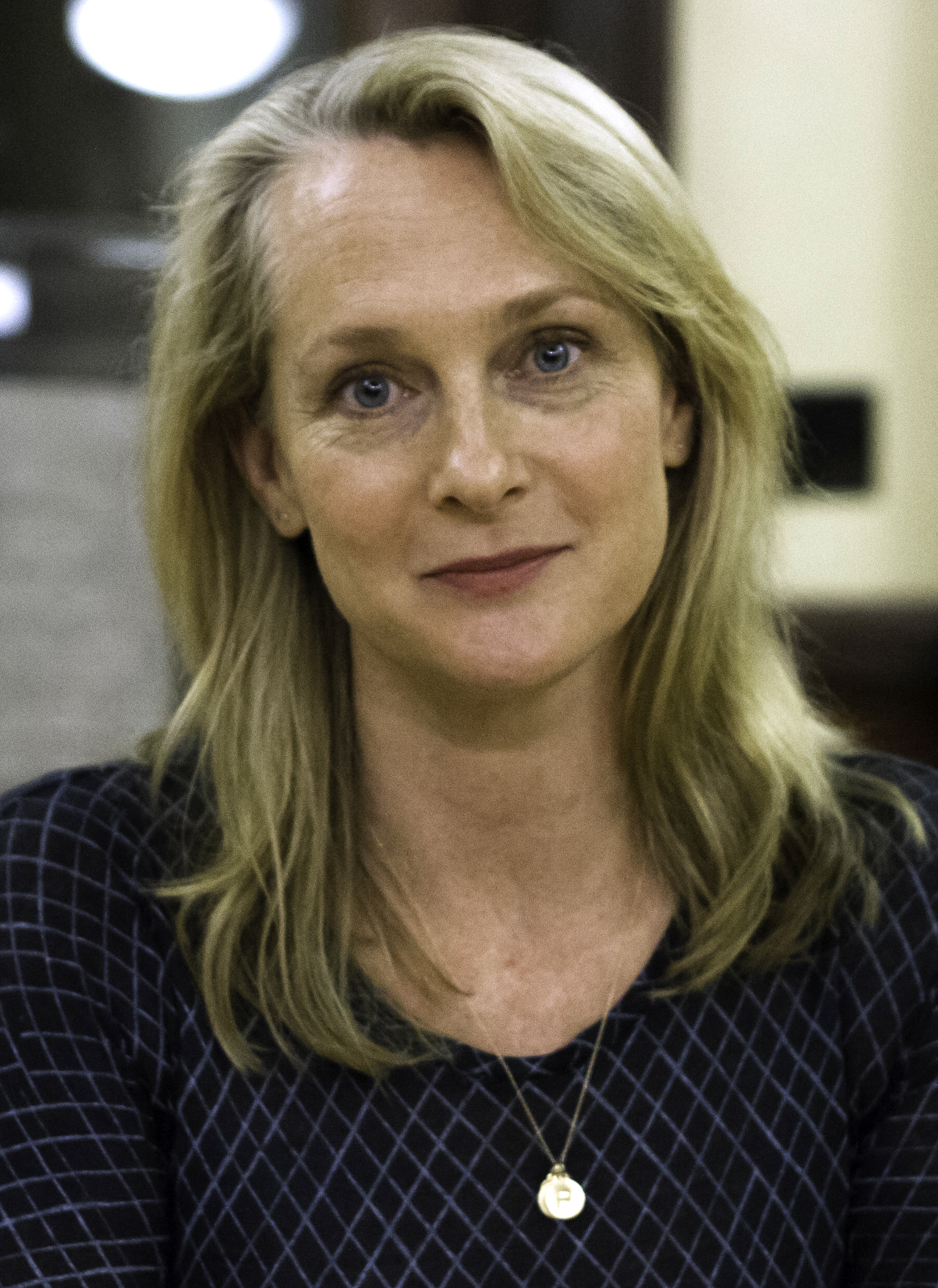
- Kerman at the University of Missouri in 2014
- Born: Piper Eressea Kerman; September 28, 1969 (age 57); Boston, Massachusetts, U.S.
- Education: Smith College
- Occupations: Writer; author; memoirist
- Notable work: Orange Is the New Black: My Year in a Women's Prison
- Spouse: Larry Smith (m. 2006)
- Website: piperkerman.com www.thepipebomb.com

Piper Eressea Kerman (born September 28, 1969) is an American author. She was indicted in 1998 on charges of felonious money-laundering and drug-trafficking activities, and sentenced to 15 months' detention in a federal correctional facility, of which she served 13 months. Her memoir of her prison experiences, Orange Is the New Black: My Year in a Women's Prison (2010), was adapted into the critically acclaimed Netflix comedy-drama series Orange Is the New Black (2013). Since leaving prison, Kerman has spoken widely about women in prison and problems with the federal prison system. She now works as a communication strategist for non-profit organizations.

== Early life and education ==
Kerman was born in Boston into a family with a number of attorneys, doctors and educators. She graduated from Swampscott High School in Swampscott, Massachusetts, in 1987, and Smith College in 1992. Kerman is a self-described WASP; however, she had a paternal grandfather who was Russian-Jewish.

== Criminal career ==
In 1993, Kerman became romantically involved with Catherine Cleary Wolters, a heroin dealer affiliated with an alleged Nigerian drug kingpin. In Kerman's memoir, Wolters is referred to as Nora Janson, and she inspired the character Alex Vause, portrayed by Laura Prepon in the television series Orange Is the New Black. Kerman became involved in the drug operation by laundering money.

In 1998, Kerman was indicted on charges of money laundering and drug trafficking. She subsequently pleaded guilty to these charges. She was sentenced to 15 months in prison and served 13 months at FCI Danbury, Connecticut, starting in 2004.

During her incarceration, Kerman created a website called The Pipe Bomb, where she wrote about her experiences in prison.

== Later career ==
Kerman's best-selling memoir about her experiences in prison, Orange Is the New Black: My Year in a Women's Prison, was published by Spiegel & Grau on April 6, 2010. A television adaptation of the same name created by Jenji Kohan, the Emmy award-winning creator of Weeds, premiered on July 11, 2013, on Netflix and aired for seven seasons. Kerman's character in the series ("Piper Chapman") is played by Taylor Schilling. Orange is the New Black has received critical acclaim and won four Emmy Awards.

Kerman serves on the board of the Women's Prison Association and is frequently invited to speak to students of creative writing, criminology, gender and women's studies law, and sociology, and to groups, like the American Correctional Association's Disproportionate Minority Confinement Task Force, federal probation officers, public defenders, justice reform advocates and volunteers, book club and formerly and currently incarcerated people.

On February 10, 2014, Kerman received the 2014 Justice Trailblazer Award from the John Jay College of Criminal Justice Center on Media, Crime & Justice.

On February 25, 2014, Kerman testified at a hearing on "Reassessing Solitary Confinement" before the Senate Judiciary Subcommittee on the Constitution, Civil Rights and Human Rights chaired by Assistant Majority Leader Dick Durbin.

On August 4, 2015, Kerman testified at a hearing on "Oversight of the Bureau of Prisons: First-Hand Accounts of Challenges Facing the Federal Prison System" before the Senate Homeland Security and Governmental Affairs Committee chaired by Senator Ron Johnson.

Since 2015, Kerman has worked as a communications strategist for nonprofits.

Since her prison sentence, Kerman has spoken publicly many times on behalf of women in corrections and about her experience.

In 2019, she appeared as a guest in the last episode of Orange Is the New Black in the last scene in the Ohio prison, when Piper visited Alex. Kerman sat two seats to the left of Alex as a convict visited by her husband (in real life). She makes a cameo appearance in the show's opening credits as the convict who blinks.

== Personal life ==
Kerman has said, "I'm bisexual, so I'm a part of the gay community (LGBT+)". She came out around the age of 18, and identified as a lesbian during most of her youth. On May 21, 2006, Kerman married writer Larry Smith, a few months after he started publishing Smith Magazine. Kerman and Smith live in Columbus, Ohio, and she teaches writing classes at the Marion Correctional Institution and the Ohio Reformatory for Women in nearby Marysville, Ohio. In 2015, she was awarded the 'Humanist Heroine of the Year Award' from the 'Humanist Hub' group at Harvard University.

== Works ==
- Orange Is the New Black: My Year in a Women's Prison

== See also ==
- Teresa Giudice, reality star and media personality whose prison memoir, Turning the Tables (2015), describes her 15-month incarceration from 2015 to 2016, for fraud, at the Federal Correctional Institution, Danbury, CT
- Martha Stewart, celebrity who was incarcerated from 2004 to 2005, for offenses related to insider trading, at Federal Prison Camp, Alderson, WV
