= Six-Word Memoirs =

Project and book series

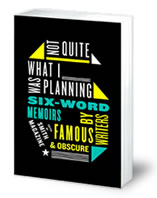
- Website type: Online magazine
- Editors: Larry Smith, Rachel Fershleiser
- Website: sixwordmemoirs.com
- Launched: 2006

Six-Word Memoirs is a project and book series created by the U.S. based online storytelling magazine Smith Magazine.

== History ==
In November 2006, Smith's editors Larry Smith and Rachel Fershleiser asked Smith readers to tell their life story in just six words, taking inspiration from a six word short story, “For sale: baby shoes, never worn”, popularly misattributed to novelist Ernest Hemingway. Smith readers submitted their memoirs via www.smithmag.net and Smith's Twitter account. In early 2007, Smith signed with Harper Perennial to create the Six-Word Memoir book series.

== Six-Word Memoirs books ==
The first in Smith's Six-Word Memoirs book series, Not Quite What I Was Planning: Six-Word Memoirs by Writers Famous and Obscure was released in early 2008. It collected almost 1,000 memoirs, including contributions from celebrities such as Richard Ford, Deepak Chopra, and Moby. It was a New York Times bestseller, featured in many stories in The New Yorker, and was highlighted on National Public Radio's Talk of the Nation.

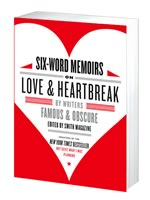
Love & Heartbreak cover

In early 2009, Smith released a follow-up, Six-Word Memoirs on Love and Heartbreak, containing hundreds of personal stories about romance. Another follow-up was released in late 2009; I Can't Keep My Own Secrets: Six-Word Memoirs by Teens Famous & Obscure dealt with the experiences of teenage life and as such was written by and for teens. The most recent in the series, It All Changed in an Instant: More Six-Word Memoirs by Writers Famous & Obscure, was released in early 2010 and was marketed as the general sequel to Not Quite What I Was Planning.

== Recognition ==
- Not Quite What I Was Planning was listed as a New York Times bestseller in 2008 in the "advice, how to and miscellaneous" category.
- In April 2009, The Denver Post listed Six-Word Memoirs on Love and Heartbreak as the 5th bestselling non-fiction paperback in the Denver area according to sales at the Tattered Cover Book Store, Barnes & Noble in Greenwood Village, the Boulder Book Store, and Borders Books in Lone Tree.

== Community impact ==
The Six-Word Memoir format has been used as a writing exercise by teachers, with examples ranging from second-grade classrooms to graduate schools; furthermore, HarperCollins created a guide to encourage the format as an instructional tool. Six-Word Memoirs have seen use in hospital wards, appeared in a eulogy, and suggested as a form of prayer by a preacher in North Carolina. Six-Word Memoir videos from individuals ranging from teenager Micah Gray to bestselling author Daniel Handler have been posted to YouTube. 6 Words Minneapolis, a public art project, employed the format to build community and empathy among citizens of Minneapolis.
