= Shooting War =

Webcomic and graphic novel by Anthony Lappé and Dan Goldman

- Cover of Grand Central Publishing edition.
- Author: Anthony Lappé
- Illustrator: Dan Goldman
- Cover artist: Dan Goldman
- Language: English
- Subject: Iraq War
- Genre: future history
- Publisher: Smith Magazine (webcomic); Grand Central Publishing (book)
- Publication date: 2006–2007 (webcomic); 2007 (book)
- Publication place: United States
- Media type: Webcomic, hardcover, paperback
- Pages: 192
- ISBN: 0446581305
- OCLC: 488181221

Shooting War is a future history webcomic and graphic novel by writer Anthony Lappé and artist Dan Goldman. Originally published in 2006, the story is set in 2011 and features John McCain as the President of the United States. It tells the story of a video-blogger named Jimmy Burns. Burns films a terrorist suicide bombing attack on a Starbucks in Brooklyn and becomes an overnight media star. Shortly afterward, he is sent to cover the still-raging war in Iraq for the fictional Global News Network.

== Publication history ==
Shooting War originated on SMITH Magazine, a web magazine about storytelling in all its forms. Writer Lappé drew upon his previous experiences in the Iraq war zone as producer of the Showtime documentary Battleground: 21 Days on the Empire's Edge.

The online comic was acquired by Warner Books (now called Grand Central Publishing) for publication as a graphic novel. The 192-page full-color hardcover book was released in the U.S. in mid-November 2007, and was simultaneously published in the UK by Weidenfeld & Nicolson.

== Storyline ==
Note: The online version of the story spans 11 chapters. The book features an additional 110 pages of material.

It is 2011 and U.S. President John McCain is aggressively pursuing the war on terror (while taking Prozac). The best-selling video game is the terrorist-simulator Infidel Massacre: Los Angeles. Brooklyn-based blogger Jimmy Burns has just gotten his new Samsung MMXI video camera and is taking it for a test drive for his vlog. While standing outside of a Starbucks explaining his views and complaints about eminent domain, a bomb inside the coffee shop detonates. Burns is blown twenty feet away. After he recovers he goes to help others affected by the blast. An employee of Global News, a controversial network which shows graphic violence, sees his vlog and almost instantly gets it placed on television. Burns becomes an instant media sensation, and the next thing he knows he's on a Black Hawk helicopter inbound for Baghdad, working for the same mainstream media conglomerate he hates. In Iraq, Burns encounters ratings-obsessed superiors, Special Ops troops, and charismatic tech-savvy jihadists — all vying to use Burns for their own ends.

== Reception ==
The webcomic received recognition from magazines, newspapers and websites such as Rolling Stone, the Village Voice, Entertainment Weekly, Wired Magazine and Publishers Weekly's The Beat blog, and was nominated for the 2007 Eisner Award for "Best Digital Comic".

USA Today chose Shooting War as their "big fall graphic novel", calling it "a subversively buzz-worthy online comic."
