= Priya's Shakti =

Graphic novel

- Date: 2014
- Publisher: Rattapallax

Creative team
- Creators: Ram Devineni; Dan Goldman

Original publication
- Date of publication: 2014

Priya's Shakti is a graphic novel by Ram Devineni and Dan Goldman, Illustrated by Sid Fini, Melanconnie and Faebian Ceruleo, whose heroine, Priya, is a "modern-day female superhero", a rape survivor who rides a flying tiger. Issued in 2014, it was followed by Priya's Mirror (2016), Priya and the Lost Girls (2019), Priya and the Wolves (2020), Priya and the Swarm (2021), Priya and the Twirling Wind (2022), and Priya and Sahas (2023).

== Background and production ==
Indian American film maker Ram Devineni was inspired to create Priya's Shakti in response to the Delhi bus rape in 2012. He travelled around India and parts of southeast Asia for almost a year, consulting with activists against gender-based violence and also with sociologists, philosophers and poets, before collaborating with American comic book designer Dan Goldman, whom he met in New York, to create a graphic novel. Produced in Hindi and English, the comic was available as a free download and was launched at Mumbai Comicon in December 2014, two years after that case. The project's social impact director was Lina Srivastava; in partnership with Aapne Aap Worldwide, an NGO helping women in India and the US, a #standwithpriya selfie campaign was organised and copies were distributed in schools. An exhibition appeared in locations around the world including New York, Torino, Barcelona, London, Sheffield, Rome and Dubai.

Priya's Shakti was India's first augmented reality comic book; scanning pages with Blippar brought up animations and true stories, and the Artivive app is now used. Associated murals in Mumbai and other cities could also be scanned with a smart phone to play video.

== Priya's Shakti ==
Priya's Shakti tells the story of Priya, a villager from India who is gang raped by men in her village. When she tells her family of her ordeal, they shun her saying she has brought shame on them. The village elders also blame her for "provoking" the men. Ashamed and scared, she flees to the forest to end her life. But the goddess Parvati, queen to the god Shiva, sees her plight and seeks to help her. She enters Priya's body and confronts the men who raped her. The men do not realize Parvati is inside Priya and try to rape her again. Angered, the goddess takes her true form. Meanwhile, Shiva is awakened from his slumber and sees how mortal men are treating his wife. Furious, he curses all mankind to impotency. But Parvati's idea prevails: Priya becomes a superpowered champion of women's rights, who will work to end violence against women by changing society. In the title of the comic, Shakti means "strength". Her tiger nature manifests as a flying tiger on which she rides, called Sahas, "courage" in Hindi.

== Priya's Mirror ==
In Priya's Mirror, the second comic in the series, released in October 2016 at the New York Film Festival in English, Hindi, Spanish, Italian and Portuguese, Priya and acid attack survivors combat the demon king Ahankar, himself an abuse victim. In a partnership with the Last Mask Campaign, readers could use Snapchat-style filters to share images of their faces as they would be after an acid attack, as a show of solidarity. The comic was written by Devineni with Indian film maker and writer Paromita Vohra, again with art by Goldman. An augmented reality exhibit and interview at Lincoln Center were part of the release.

== Priya and the Lost Girls ==
Priya and the Lost Girls appeared in December 2019 and was scripted by Indian American actress and playwright Dipti Mehta, who researched sex trafficking for her one-woman show, Honour; Ruchira Gupta, the founder of Apne Aap, also collaborated on it. Priya finds all the girls have vanished from her village, including her sister, Lakshmi; she rescues them from an underground brothel city run by the demon Rahu, who turns any women who resist to stone, but the rescued girls must then also stand up for their rights against the villagers who refuse to take them back, scorning them as "lepers". Devineni chose this theme for the third comic in the series after visiting the red light district of Sonagachi in Kolkata and talking to women who were in the sex trade after being tricked, or believing they had no other way to earn a living.

== Awards and recognition ==
Priya's Shakti received a grant from the 2014 Tribeca Film Institute New Media Fund, supported by the Ford Foundation. UN Women named the heroine a 2014 Gender Equality Champion.

Priya's Mirror was funded by the World Bank WEvolve programme and received the Special Jury Prize at the 2017 FilmGate Interactive Media Festival in Miami.

== See also ==
- Blank Noise
- List of feminist comic books
- Rape in India
- Sexism in India
- Women in India
