= Short Time =

1990 film directed by Gregg Champion

- Theatrical poster
- Directed by: Gregg Champion
- Written by: John Blumenthal; Michael Berry; William Osborne
- Produced by: Michael Borofsky; Bruce McNall; Joe Wizan; Todd Black
- Starring: Dabney Coleman; Matt Frewer; Teri Garr; Barry Corbin; Joe Pantoliano
- Cinematography: John J. Connor
- Edited by: Frank Morriss; Michael Ripps
- Music by: Ira Newborn
- Production company: Gladden Entertainment
- Distributed by: 20th Century Fox
- Release date: May 4, 1990
- Running time: 97 minutes
- Country: United States
- Language: English
- Box office: $4,010,647

Short Time is a 1990 American action comedy film directed by Gregg Champion. It stars Dabney Coleman, Matt Frewer, and Teri Garr.

== Synopsis ==
Seattle detective Burt Simpson (Dabney Coleman), 8 days from retirement, is so concerned about planning for the future that he does not appreciate the present. He is especially obsessed with ensuring financial support to allow his young son Dougie (Kaj-Erik Eriksen) to one day attend Harvard. Burt's aversion to risk hinders his police work and has strained his relationships with his partner Ernie Dills (Matt Frewer) and his ex-wife Carolyn (Teri Garr).

Burt has a blood test done at a hospital, but after a mix-up (caused by another patient switching vials to hide his own recent use of marijuana), Burt's doctors tell him that he has a rare untreatable blood disease. Believing he has only a short time to live, Burt checks his police life insurance. He discovers that his family will only receive a large payout if he dies in the line of duty. Burt resolves to be killed in his last week on the force and demands his captain puts him on the most dangerous assignments.

Burt happily responds to a domestic disturbance call, aware that such events often turn violent. However, it turns out to be a near-deaf elderly couple who were mishearing one another. When the error is revealed, the two happily reconcile. Soon after, Burt learns of a dangerous high-speed car chase and ditches his partner Ernie to get involved, hoping to die in a crash. Burt's reckless driving demolishes both his own car and the suspects' vehicle, but to his chagrin he survives. His heroism leads to the apprehension of the suspects, henchmen of local gun smuggler Carl Stark (Xander Berkeley), and Burt is awarded a medal for his bravery.

During his off-time, Burt begins living in the moment and appreciating life. He reveals his genuine respect and affection for Ernie, and he apologizes to his ex-wife Carolyn for allowing his neuroses to hamper their relationship. Carolyn and Burt reveal that they still love one another and reconcile.

Burt and Ernie are called to a hostage crisis involving a crazed man with a bomb. Burt strips to his underwear and rushes into the building ahead of the armored negotiator. Inside, Burt, with his newfound appreciation for the preciousness of life and family, convinces the bomber to surrender peacefully. After everyone has evacuated the building, Burt realizes he forgot to retrieve the bomb and the building explodes. Burt is awarded another medal for bravery.

Burt spends more quality time with his son and buys a sports car. Ernie, although happy for Burt, is mystified by his partner's changed behavior and investigates, discovering the hospital mix-up. However, Burt, determined to get himself killed in his last day on the job, has tracked down the heavily armed cop killer Stark. In the ensuing chase, Stark continually misses Burt with guns and grenades, much to both men's frustration. Eventually the two men are struggling on a window washer's scaffold atop a skyscraper, when Ernie arrives in a helicopter and tells Burt about the hospital's mistake. Burt realizes he is not fatally ill, but it is apparently too late: Stark falls to his death with Burt falling after him.

The final scene occurs at a funeral. Burt is suddenly revealed as attending—the funeral is for the other hospital patient who switched the vials. Burt tells his son that the man "gave me back my life." As a retirement present, his captain gives Burt a photo showing what really happened: although Simpson did fall from the scaffold, his leg became entangled in some ropes, and he wound up dangling upside-down. As Burt and his family drive off in a convertible, he sees a police chase and initially follows, before remembering he is retired; he asks his family what they would like to do instead.

== Cast ==
- Dabney Coleman as Detective Burt Simpson
- Matt Frewer as Detective Ernie Dills
- Teri Garr as Carolyn Simpson
- Barry Corbin as Captain
- Joe Pantoliano as Scalese
- Xander Berkeley as Carl Stark
- Kaj-Erik Eriksen as Dougie Simpson
- Rob Roy as Detective Dan Miller
- Tony Pantages as Vito
- Kim Kondrashoff as Michael Lutz
- Paul Jarrett as Jonas Lutz
- Kevin McNulty as Dr. Drexler
- Paul Batten as Dr. Goldman
- Wes Tritter as Coffin Salesman

== Reception ==
On the review aggregator website Rotten Tomatoes, 29% of 7 critics' reviews are positive.

== Home releases ==
The film was released on Region 2 DVD by Carlton International Media UK in 2002 and on Region 3 DVD in South Korea. It has only been released on VHS and Laserdisc by Live Home Video in the United States.
