= Dabney Coleman =

American actor (1932–2024)

- Coleman in Apple Pie, 1978
- Born: Dabney Wharton Coleman; January 3, 1932; Austin, Texas, U.S.
- Died: May 16, 2024 (aged 92); Santa Monica, California, U.S.
- Education: University of Texas at Austin (BA)
- Occupation: Actor
- Years active: 1961–2019
- Spouses: Ann Courtney Harrell (m. 1957; div. 1959); Jean Hale (m. 1961; div. 1983)
- Children: 4

Dabney Wharton Coleman (January 3, 1932 – May 16, 2024) was an American actor. He was recognized for his roles portraying egomaniacal and unlikeable characters in comedic performances. Throughout his career, he appeared in over 175 films and television programs and received awards for both comedic and dramatic performances.

Coleman's notable films include 9 to 5 (1980), On Golden Pond (1981), Tootsie (1982), WarGames (1983), Cloak & Dagger (1984), and You've Got Mail (1998). His significant television roles included Merle Jeeter on Mary Hartman, Mary Hartman (1976–1977), the title characters in Buffalo Bill (1983–1984) and The Slap Maxwell Story (1987–1988), and Burton Fallin on The Guardian (2001–2004). Later in his career, he portrayed Louis "The Commodore" Kaestner on Boardwalk Empire (2010–2011). His final role was an appearance on Yellowstone (2019). As a voice actor, he provided the voice of Principal Peter Prickly on Recess (1997–2001) and in several movies based on the series.

Coleman won one Primetime Emmy Award from six nominations and one Golden Globe Award from three nominations.

== Early life ==
Coleman was born the youngest of four children in Austin, Texas, on January 3, 1932, to Randolph and Mary Johns Coleman. His father died from pneumonia when Dabney was four years old. He, his older brother, and two older sisters were then raised by his mother in Corpus Christi, Texas. He attended Corpus Christi High School, where he excelled at tennis and became nationally ranked as a junior tennis player.

In 1949, at the age of 17, he enrolled at Virginia Military Institute, where he studied for two years and competed on the school's tennis team. He then attended the University of Texas at Austin for two years, graduating in 1954 with a B.A. in drama. Coleman later recalled that he did not pass many courses and that he was "too busy playing Ping-Pong at the Phi Delta Theta house and calling girls". He was drafted into the United States Army in 1953 and served in West Germany in the Army's Special Services for two years. He later told an interviewer, "I spent my military service either playing or teaching tennis." After being discharged by the Army in 1955, he returned to the University of Texas at Austin to enroll in law school.

== Career ==
=== Early career ===
That was the turning point in my career. I had done a comedy, That Girl, the first season, kind of a weird-ass character that didn't attract a lot of attention. It was okay in retrospect. When I've seen 'em in replays it wasn't bad, but it wasn't as colorful or as catchy as the Merle Jeeter character, which was supposed to be six episodes and then gone. But I was good in the part. The writing was very good, the people I worked with were excellent, and the character was just wonderful. Just a once-in-a-lifetime character ... he was just the worst human being, Merle Jeeter. [Laughs.] That's kind of where it all started, as far as people's belief that I could do comedy, particularly that negative, caustic, cynical kind of guy.

— Coleman, discussing Mary Hartman, Mary Hartman with The A.V. Club, September 2012

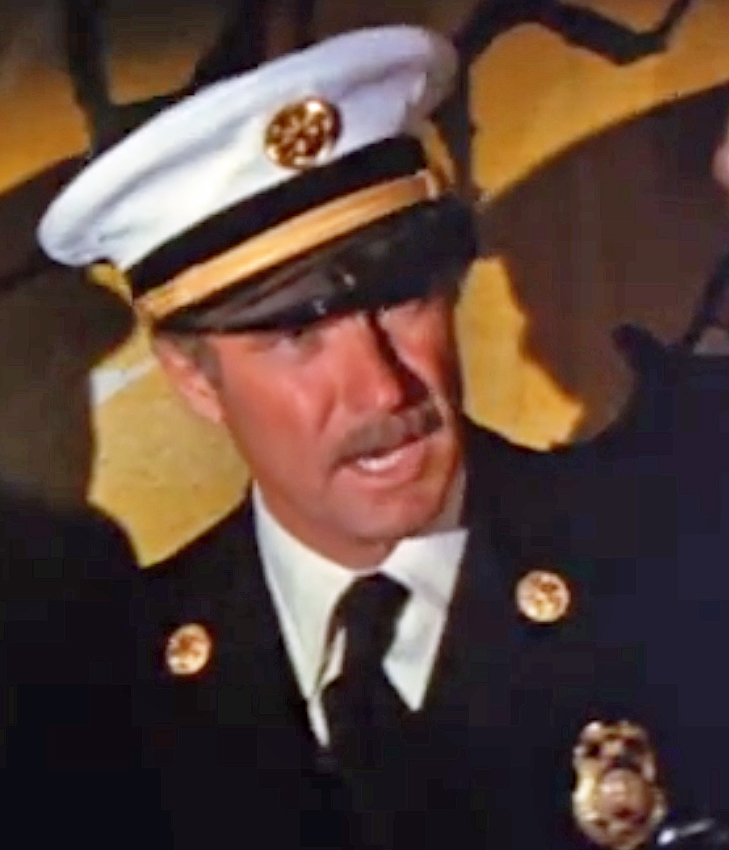
Coleman in The Towering Inferno (1974)

Coleman was not doing well in law school, and it seemed unlikely that he would become a lawyer. In 1957, while still in law school, Coleman married Ann Courtney Harrell. Though their marriage only lasted two years, it had a major impact on Coleman's career. A 45-minute visit from his wife's friend Zachary Scott inspired Coleman to drop out of law school and pursue acting as a career. Coleman recounted, "I'll never forget the way he stood and asked if my wife was at home. He had style. In that moment I knew I wanted to be an actor, to be like Zachary Scott. The next day I got on an airplane and flew to New York."

Once in New York City, Coleman started applying to acting schools. He enrolled in the Neighborhood Playhouse School of the Theatre, training with Sanford Meisner, and studied there from 1958 to 1960. Meisner told him: "You're ideal for us. You've lived some." Another one of his instructors was the future director Sydney Pollack, with whom Coleman would soon become friends.

Soon after finishing his training under Meisner, Coleman made his Broadway debut in the short-lived A Call on Kuprin in 1961. He followed that with summer stock performances on the east coast.

His first television role was on an episode of Naked City in 1961, which was filmed on location in New York City and he earned $90 for the role. In 1962, he and his second wife, actress Jean Hale, moved to Los Angeles. He soon signed a contract with Universal and started work in television, appearing as a guest on various shows starting in the early 1960s. For example, in a 1964 episode of the anthology series Kraft Suspense Theatre titled "The Threatening Eye", Coleman played private investigator William Gunther.

In 1965, he landed his first movie role in The Slender Thread, which was also Pollack's directorial debut.

In his first recurring role on television, he played Dr. Leon Bessemer, a neighbor and friend of the protagonist, in the first season of That Girl (1966). Other early roles in his career included a U.S. Olympic skiing team coach in Downhill Racer (1969), a high-ranking fire chief in The Towering Inferno (1974), and a wealthy Westerner in Bite the Bullet (1975). He portrayed an FBI agent in Attack on Terror: The FBI vs. the Ku Klux Klan (1975).

In the satirical soap opera Mary Hartman, Mary Hartman (1976–1977), Coleman was initially cast for six episodes as Merle Jeeter, the duplicitous father of a child preacher, but his performance secured him a regular role on the show. The part was also the first time he played an unsavory character for comedic effect, which would become a frequent theme in his career.

In his earliest roles such as in That Girl, he did not have facial hair. He first grew the mustache that would be associated with many of his roles in 1973. He later said, "Without the mustache, I looked too much like Richard Nixon." He also reflected, "There's no question that when I grew that mustache, all of a sudden, everything changed."

=== 9 to 5 and leading roles ===
That opened up the movies for me. The girls [Jane Fonda, Lily Tomlin, and Dolly Parton] were so supportive of me, and included me in everything. They were on a whole different level than I was at the time, but they were very sensitive about that, and made sure that I was included in every publicity shot and tour. All three of them insisted, "Where's Dabney? Get him in here!" They're all three unique and wonderful ladies, all three of them.

— Coleman, discussing 9 to 5 with Vulture, November 2010

Coleman landed the role of primary antagonist Franklin Hart Jr. in the 1980 film 9 to 5, in which he portrayed a sexist boss on whom three female office employees get their revenge. It was this film that firmly established Coleman in the character type with which he was most identified, and frequently played afterwards—a comic relief villain. Coleman followed 9 to 5 with the role of the arrogant, sexist, soap opera director in Tootsie (1982), also directed by Sydney Pollack. He also portrayed a con artist Broadway producer in The Muppets Take Manhattan (1984), played the nefarious raisin tycoon Tyler Cane in the satirical miniseries Fresno (1986), and evoked Hugh Hefner as a lisping magazine mogul in the comedy Dragnet (1987).

Coleman broke from type somewhat in other film roles. He appeared in the feature film On Golden Pond (1981), playing the sympathetic fiancé of Chelsea Thayer Wayne (Jane Fonda). He also played a military computer scientist in WarGames (1983), and he played a dual role as a loving but busy father, as well as his son's imaginary hero, in Cloak & Dagger (1984). Coleman played an aging cop who thinks he is terminally ill in the 1990 comedy Short Time.

While Coleman frequently transitioned between roles in film and television, it was his television performances that earned him the most formal recognition and awards. He received his first Emmy Award nomination for his lead role as a skilled but self-centered TV host in Buffalo Bill. In 1987, he received an Emmy Award for his role in the television film Sworn to Silence. Later that year, Coleman starred in The Slap Maxwell Story (1987–1988), playing a cantankerous sportswriter. Although the show was short-lived, Coleman won the Golden Globe Award for Best Actor – Television Series Musical or Comedy for the role in 1988.

Despite these accolades, many of Coleman's television shows, including award-winning shows like Buffalo Bill and The Slap Maxwell Story, were noted for struggles with low ratings and brief runs. Other series he appeared in, like Drexell's Class (1991–1992) and Madman of the People (1994–1995), faced similar challenges.

=== Other roles ===
In other comedic film roles, he played Bobcat Goldthwait's boss in the 1988 talking-horse comedy Hot to Trot, and befuddled banker Milburn Drysdale in the feature film The Beverly Hillbillies (1993), which reunited him with 9 to 5 co-stars Lily Tomlin and Dolly Parton. Continuing his streak of comic foils, Coleman played Charles Grodin's sleazy boss, Gerald Ellis, in Clifford (1994), co-starring Martin Short. From 1997 to 2001, Coleman provided the voice of Principal Prickly on the animated series Recess and several films based on the series. He also played a philandering father in You've Got Mail (1998), and a police chief in Inspector Gadget (which reunited him with his WarGames co-star Matthew Broderick).

=== Later career ===
I think he reached out and said he would be really interested in doing something. I had worked with Dabney many, many years ago, almost 20 years ago, as one of the young pups. He's a Texas guy and was such a gifted, giving actor and I was really struck by how good he was, and how kind he was, to this kid who was guest starring on his deal. It's funny; I've employed a lot of people who were good to me when I was a young actor.

— Taylor Sheridan, discussing casting Coleman in Yellowstone with Deadline, August 2019

In his later career, Coleman took on more consistently serious roles, notably portraying Burton Fallin in the TV series The Guardian (2001–2004). In an interview with the Associated Press, Coleman described his dream job as a "serious show about a serious subject, good writing, good actors" and said that his role on The Guardian was "kind of that dream come true". He also appeared as a casino owner in 2005's Domino. In 2009, Coleman served as an interviewer and participant in Char·ac·ter, a documentary about the craft of acting with Peter Falk, Charles Grodin, Sydney Pollack, Mark Rydell, and Harry Dean Stanton. For two seasons, from 2010 to 2011, Coleman was a series regular on HBO's Boardwalk Empire, sharing two Screen Actors Guild Awards for Outstanding Performance by an Ensemble in a Drama Series.

On November 6, 2014, Coleman received a star on the Hollywood Walk of Fame and was honored with the 2017 Mary Pickford Award for his contributions to the entertainment industry.

His final roles included a small part in Warren Beatty's comedy Rules Don't Apply in 2016, and a guest role in 2019 as Kevin Costner's dying father in Yellowstone, which would be his final role.

== Personal life ==
Coleman was married to Ann Courtney Harrell from 1957 to 1959 and Jean Hale from 1961 to 1983. He had four children.

Coleman was a tennis player, winning celebrity and charity tournaments. He played mainly at the Riviera Country Club as well as in local tournaments. He was also known for being a regular at the Dan Tana's restaurant in West Hollywood, where a large New York Steak is named after him. When Coleman received his star on the Hollywood Walk of Fame, an after party was held at Dan Tana's to celebrate the occasion. His favorite sports team was the St. Louis Browns, which are now the Baltimore Orioles.

In the 1980s and 1990s, it was noted by several journalists that Coleman chain-smoked cigarettes during his interviews. He was described as a "lean and impossibly fit-looking 62 years old" by The New York Times in 1994. In 2011, Coleman started treatment for throat cancer, which sometimes affected his ability to speak. The diagnosis led to a rapid rewrite and early filming of his scenes for the second season of Boardwalk Empire. In a 2012 interview, he discussed his experience filming the series while dealing with cancer, lighting up a cigarette at one point during the interview, and mentioned that he no longer had cancer.

== Death ==
Coleman died at his home in Santa Monica, California, on May 16, 2024, at age 92, due to dysphagia and heart failure.

== Filmography ==
=== Film ===
| Year | Title | Role | Notes |
|---|---|---|---|
| 1965 | The Slender Thread | Charlie | Movie debut |
| 1966 | This Property Is Condemned | Salesman | |
| 1968 | The Scalphunters | Jed | |
| 1969 | The Trouble with Girls | Harrison Wilby | |
| 1969 | Downhill Racer | Mayo | |
| 1970 | I Love My Wife | Frank Donnelly | |
| 1973 | Cinderella Liberty | Executive Officer | |
| 1974 | The Dove | Charles Huntley | |
| 1974 | The Towering Inferno | SFFD Deputy Chief 1 | |
| 1974 | Black Fist | Heineken | |
| 1975 | Bite the Bullet | Jack Parker | |
| 1975 | The Other Side of the Mountain | Dave McCoy | |
| 1976 | Midway | Captain Murray Arnold | |
| 1977 | Viva Knievel! | Ralph Thompson | |
| 1977 | Rolling Thunder | Maxwell | |
| 1979 | North Dallas Forty | Emmett Hunter | |
| 1980 | Nothing Personal | Dickerson | |
| 1980 | How to Beat the High Cost of Living | Jack Heintzel | |
| 1980 | Melvin and Howard | Judge Keith Hayes | |
| 1980 | 9 to 5 | Franklin M. Hart Jr. | |
| 1980 | Pray TV | Marvin Fleece | |
| 1981 | On Golden Pond | Dr. Bill Ray | |
| 1981 | Modern Problems | Mark Winslow | |
| 1982 | Young Doctors in Love | Dr. Joseph Prang | |
| 1982 | Tootsie | Ron Carlisle | |
| 1983 | WarGames | Dr. John McKittrick | |
| 1984 | The Muppets Take Manhattan | Martin Price / Murray Plotsky | |
| 1984 | Cloak & Dagger | Jack Flack / Hal Osborne | |
| 1985 | The Man with One Red Shoe | Burton Cooper | |
| 1987 | Dragnet | Jerry Caesar | |
| 1988 | Hot to Trot | Walter Sawyer | |
| 1990 | Where the Heart Is | Stewart McBain | |
| 1990 | Short Time | Burt Simpson | |
| 1990 | Meet the Applegates | Aunt Bea | |
| 1992 | There Goes the Neighborhood | Jeffrey Babitt | |
| 1993 | Amos & Andrew | Police Chief Cecil Tolliver | |
| 1993 | The Beverly Hillbillies | Milburn Drysdale | |
| 1994 | Clifford | Gerald Ellis | |
| 1994 | Judicial Consent | Charles Mayron | |
| 1997 | Witch Way Love | Joel | |
| 1998 | You've Got Mail | Nelson Fox | |
| 1999 | Inspector Gadget | Police Chief Quimby | |
| 1999 | Stuart Little | Dr. Beechwood | |
| 2001 | Recess: School's Out | Principal Peter Prickly | Voice |
| 2001 | Recess Christmas: Miracle on Third Street | Principal Peter Prickly | Voice |
| 2002 | The Climb | Mack Leonard | |
| 2002 | Moonlight Mile | Mike Mulcahey | |
| 2003 | Where the Red Fern Grows | Grandpa | |
| 2003 | Recess: All Growed Down | Principal Peter Prickly | Voice |
| 2003 | Recess: Taking the Fifth Grade | Principal Peter Prickly | Voice |
| 2005 | Domino | Drake Bishop | |
| 2009 | Char·ac·ter | Himself | |
| 2016 | Rules Don't Apply | Raymond Holliday | |
| 2022 | Still Working 9 to 5 | Himself | |

=== Television ===
| Year | Title | Role | Notes |
|---|---|---|---|
| 1964 | Kraft Suspense Theatre | William Gunther | Episode: "The Threatening Eye" |
| 1966–1967 | That Girl | Dr. Leon Bessemer | Recurring role |
| 1971–1972 | Bright Promise | Dr. Tracy Graham | Recurring role |
| 1972 | Mannix | | Episode: "Portrait of a Hero" |
| 1973–1991 | Columbo | Detective Murray / Hugh Creighton | 2 episodes |
| 1974 | Bad Ronald | Mr. Wood | Television film |
| 1975 | Attack on Terror: The FBI vs. the Ku Klux Klan | Paul Mathison | Television film |
| 1976–1977 | Mary Hartman, Mary Hartman | Merle Jeeter | Recurring role, later main cast |
| 1977 | Fernwood 2 Night | Merle Jeeter | Premiere episode |
| 1977–1978 | Forever Fernwood | Merle Jeeter | Main cast |
| 1978 | Apple Pie | "Fast Eddie" Murtaugh | Main cast |
| 1978 | The Love Boat | | Episode: "The Last Hundred Bucks" |
| 1983–1984 | Buffalo Bill | Bill Bittinger | Main cast |
| 1986 | Fresno | Tyler Cane | Main cast |
| 1986 | Murrow | CBS President William S. Paley | Television film |
| 1987 | Sworn to Silence | Martin Costigan | Television film |
| 1987–1988 | The Slap Maxwell Story | Slap Maxwell | Main cast |
| 1988 | Baby M | Gary Skoloff | Two-part movie |
| 1988 | Maybe Baby | Hal | Television film |
| 1991 | Never Forget | William Cox | Television film |
| 1991–1992 | Drexell's Class | Otis Drexell | Main cast |
| 1994–1995 | Madman of the People | Jack "Madman" Buckner | Main cast |
| 1997 | The Magic School Bus | Horace Scope | Voice, episode: "Sees Stars" |
| 1997–2001 | Recess | Principal Peter Prickly | Voice, main cast |
| 1998 | My Date with the President's Daughter | President Richmond | Television film |
| 1998 | Exiled: A Law & Order Movie | Lieutenant Dennis Stolper | Television film |
| 2001–2004 | The Guardian | Burton Fallin | Main cast |
| 2002 | The Zeta Project | Thomas Boyle | Voice, episode: "Hunt in the Hub" |
| 2006 | Courting Alex | Bill Rose | Main cast |
| 2009 | Law & Order: Special Victims Unit | Frank Hagar | Episode: "Snatched" |
| 2010–2011 | Pound Puppies | Mayor Jerry | Voice, 4 episodes |
| 2010–2011 | Boardwalk Empire | Commodore Louis Kaestner | Main cast |
| 2016 | Ray Donovan | Ronnie Price | Episode: "Federal Boobie Inspector" |
| 2019 | NCIS | John Sydney | Episode: "The Last Link" |
| 2019 | Yellowstone | John Dutton Jr. | Episode: "Sins of the Father" (final role) |

=== Music videos ===
| Year | Title | Artist | Role | Notes |
|---|---|---|---|---|
| 2019 | "Star Maps" | Aly & AJ | Himself | |

== Awards and nominations ==
| Year | Award | Category | Work | Result | Ref. |
|---|---|---|---|---|---|
| 1987 | CableACE Awards | Actor in a Movie or Miniseries | Murrow | Nominated | |
| 1983 | Golden Globe Awards | Best Actor in a Television Series – Musical or Comedy | Buffalo Bill | Nominated | |
| 1987 | Golden Globe Awards | Best Actor in a Television Series – Musical or Comedy | The Slap Maxwell Story | Won | |
| 1987 | Golden Globe Awards | Best Actor in a Supporting Role in a Series, Miniseries or Motion Picture Made for Television | Sworn to Silence | Nominated | |
| 1983 | Primetime Emmy Awards | Outstanding Lead Actor in a Comedy Series | Buffalo Bill | Nominated | |
| 1984 | Primetime Emmy Awards | Outstanding Lead Actor in a Comedy Series | Buffalo Bill | Nominated | |
| 1987 | Primetime Emmy Awards | Outstanding Supporting Actor in a Miniseries or a Special | Sworn to Silence | Won | |
| 1988 | Primetime Emmy Awards | Outstanding Lead Actor in a Comedy Series | The Slap Maxwell Story | Nominated | |
| 1988 | Primetime Emmy Awards | Outstanding Supporting Actor in a Miniseries or a Special | Baby M | Nominated | |
| 1991 | Primetime Emmy Awards | Outstanding Guest Actor in a Drama Series | Columbo, episode: "Columbo and the Murder of a Rock Star" | Nominated | |
| 2017 | Satellite Awards | Mary Pickford Award | —N/a | Won | |
| 2010 | Screen Actors Guild Awards | Outstanding Performance by an Ensemble in a Drama Series | Boardwalk Empire | Won | |
| 2011 | Screen Actors Guild Awards | Outstanding Performance by an Ensemble in a Drama Series | Boardwalk Empire | Won | |

=== Other honors ===
| Year | Honor | Category | Result | Ref. |
|---|---|---|---|---|
| 2014 | Hollywood Walk of Fame | Television | Inducted | |
