= Dan Goldman (writer) =

American writer, cartoonist, and producer (born 1974)

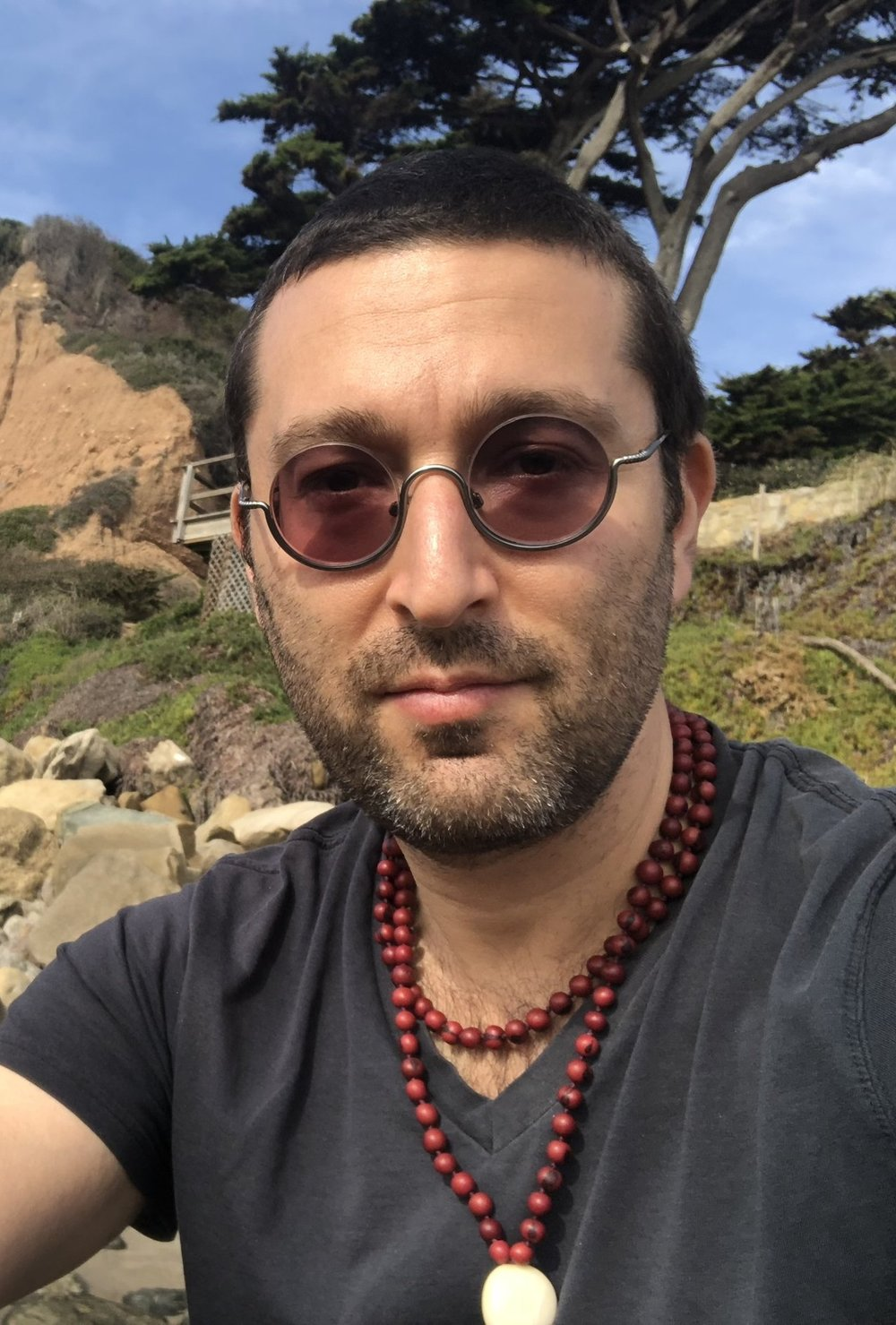
- Born: Daniel Aaron Goldman; May 11, 1974 (age 52) Detroit, Michigan, US
- Areas: Writer, artist
- Notable works: Priya's Shakti, Red Light Properties, 08: A Graphic Diary of the Campaign Trail, Shooting War

Daniel Aaron Goldman (born May 11, 1974) is an American writer and artist living in Los Angeles. He is the creator of webcomics such as Shooting War, Red Light Properties and the Priya's Shakti series. He is the founder and narrative lead of the Los Angeles–based Kinjin Story Lab.

== Early career ==
The third book, Priya and the Lost Girls, concerns human trafficking and was released in 2019.

== Kinjin Story Lab ==
Goldman founded Kinjin Story Lab.
