= For sale: baby shoes, never worn =

Example of a very short story

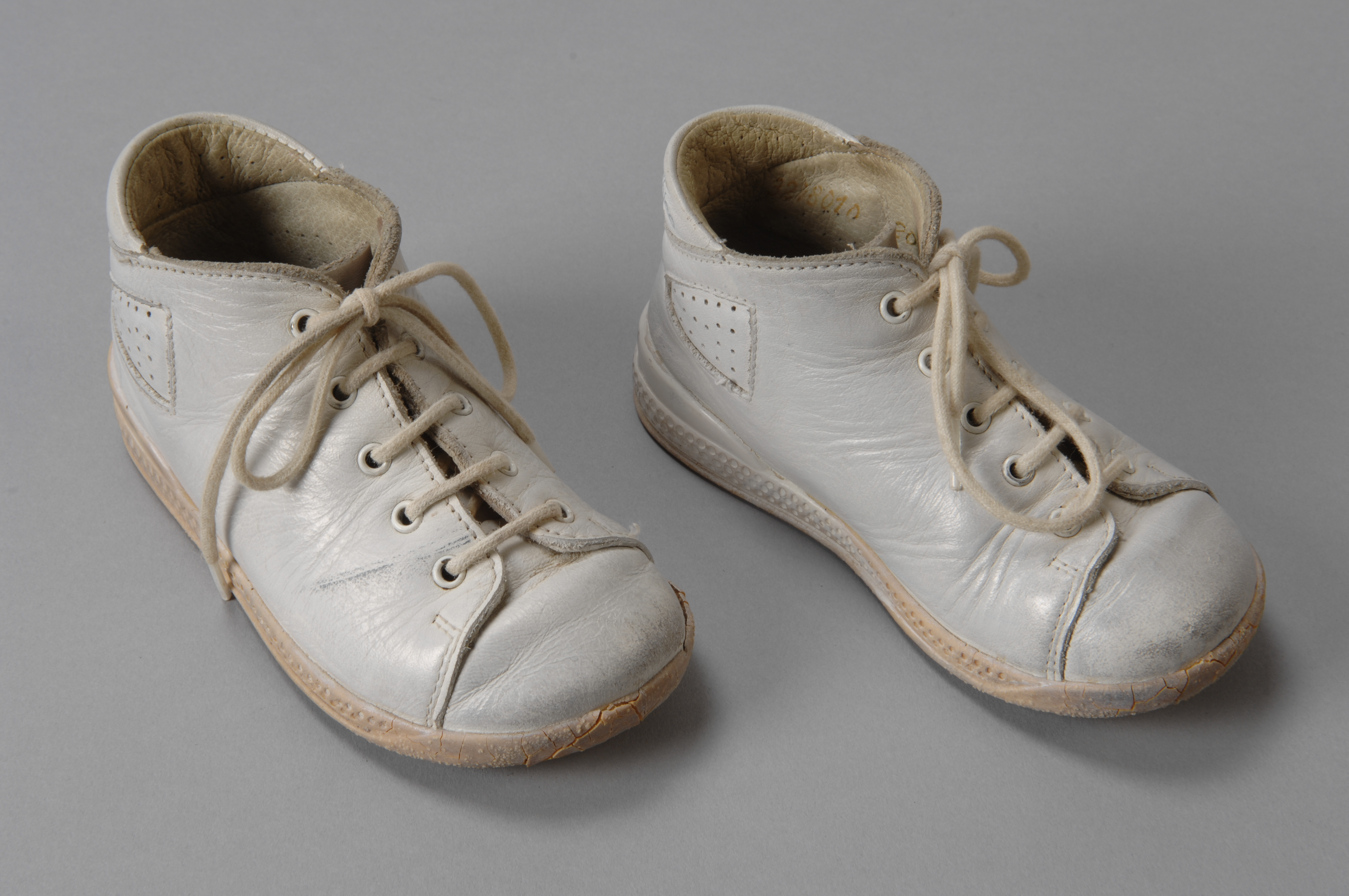
A six-word story regarding a pair of baby shoes is considered an extreme example of flash fiction.

"For sale: baby shoes, never worn." is a six-word story. Versions of the story date back to the early 1900s, and it was being reproduced and expanded upon within a few years of its initial publication.

The story is popularly misattributed to Ernest Hemingway; this is implausible, as versions of the story first appeared in 1906, when Hemingway was 7 years old, and it was first attributed to him in 1989, almost 30 years after his death.

== Setting ==
The story is in the form of a classified ad, and suggests a larger narrative involving pregnancy loss, sudden infant death, or abandoned plans for a child.

== History ==
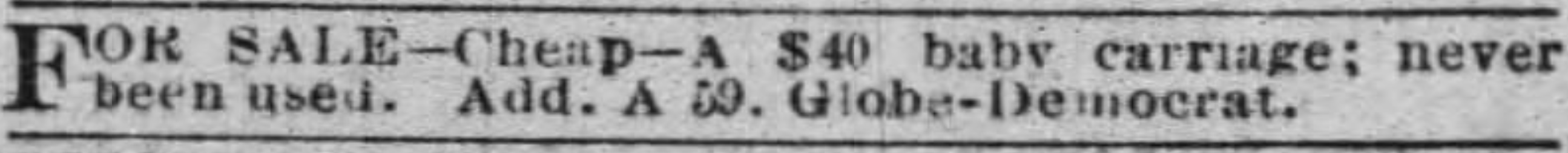
The 1883 ad

Examples of actual classified ads with similar wordings date back to as early as 1883, where an ad read: "FOR SALE–Cheap–A $40 baby carriage; never been used." An example from 1906 reads "For sale, baby carriage; never been used. Apply at this office."

An article titled "Tragedy of Baby's Death is Revealed in Sale of Clothes" was published in 1910, writing that "even in every day life, items and experience, small and usual to us, perhaps, is woven a little story of the heart." An excerpt of the article reads:

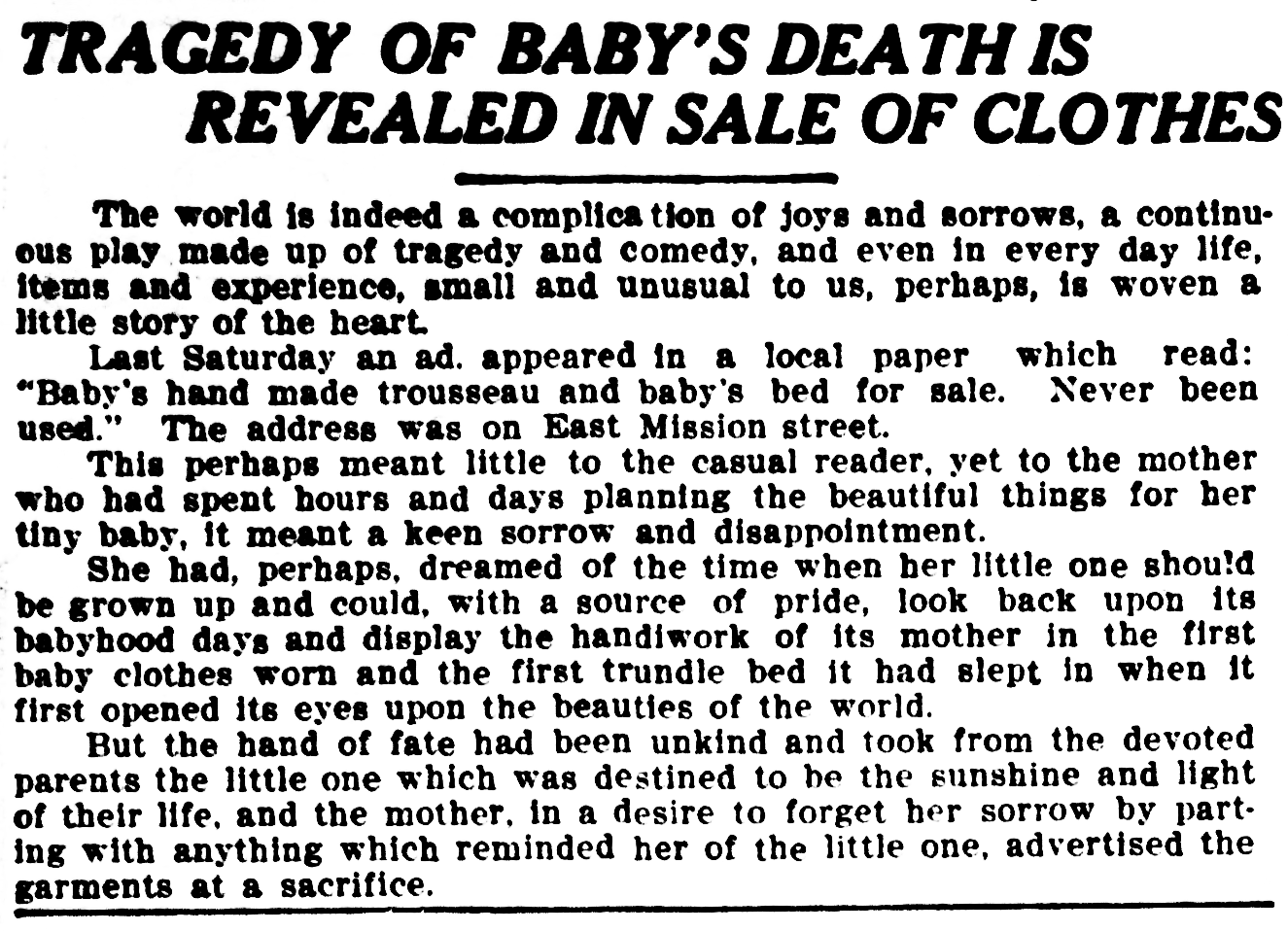
The 1910 article from The Spokane Press

Last Saturday an ad. appeared in a local paper which read: “Baby’s hand made trousseau and baby’s bed for sale. Never been used.” [...]
This perhaps meant little to the casual reader, yet to the mother who had spent hours and days planning the beautiful things for her tiny baby, it meant a keen sorrow and disappointment.

In 1917, an article in a literary periodical outlined a story where the mental suffering of a grief-stricken woman who had lost her baby could be represented by the "concrete symbol" of a pair of "little shoes, never worn" and suggested such a story might be titled "Little Shoes, Never Worn":

To give the first example that comes to mind: Our story is one of a wife who has lost her baby, her only possible one, and her grief removes her from the world, and even threatens to estrange her from her husband. Evidently much of her struggle toward normality will be a mental one; the crisis of her struggle certainly will be mental. To bring the story "down-to-the-ground," there must be some concrete symbol of the struggle and the wife's victory. Suppose this symbol is a pair of "little shoes, never worn." The title of the story might be "Little Shoes, Never Worn." The victory of the wife, her gain to normality, might be symbolized by the giving away of this pair of shoes, over which she has often wept, to a needy babe of another mother. The story I have outlined inclines to the sentimental, but I think it proves my point.

A June 1921 article in Life magazine quotes a newspaper article:

The great American dramatist will be the man or woman who can write a one-act play as poignant as a seven-word want ad which the Houston Post discovers: For Sale, a baby carriage; never used.

A July 1921 article in the satirical Judge magazine referenced the same ad, with its author writing "I am an imaginative soul. That is the reason you are reading this; that and the fact that I read this: 'For sale, a baby carriage, never used.' Merely a classified ad in a Houston paper, but it took hold on me and would not let me alone. Sympathy is the natural environment of my soul. I re-read the ad. My fancy lingered on the last two words; the pathos of them; the tragedy that was in them." The author claimed to have tracked down the poster of the ad to inquire as to the reason the it was posted, only to be told: "'It's only a single and—' he grinned, damn him—'when the time came we had to get a double-seater.'"

Quote Investigator found further references to the Houston Post ad story from 1924 and 1927.

== Ernest Hemingway attribution ==
The story is often attributed to American writer Ernest Hemingway. The claim of Hemingway's authorship originates in an unsubstantiated anecdote about a wager among him and other writers. The earliest known appearance of this anecdote occurs in a one-man play called Papa: A Play Based on the Legendary Lives of Ernest Hemingway written by John De Groot which debuted in 1989. De Groot has the character of Hemingway utter the phrase as a means of illustrating his brevity:

Bet you I can write a complete short story using only 6 words.
Any takers?
No?

GRINS.

Okay, then.
A short story in 6 words:
‘For sale.
Baby shoes.
Never worn.’

In Playbill, De Groot later defended his portrayal of Hemingway by saying, "Everything in the play is based on events as described by Ernest Hemingway, or those who knew him well. Whether or not these things actually happened is something we'll never know truly. But Hemingway and many others claimed they did."

This attribution was repeated in a 1991 book by Peter Miller called Get Published! Get Produced!: A Literary Agent's Tips on How to Sell Your Writing. He said he was told the story by a "well-established newspaper syndicator" in 1974.

Also in 1991, science fiction writer Arthur C. Clarke recounted the anecdote, writing about how Hemingway was "supposed to have won a $10 bet (no small sum in the '20s) from his fellow writers. They paid up without a word. ... Here it is. I still can't think of it without crying— FOR SALE. BABY SHOES. NEVER WORN."

== Legacy ==
Telling a story in very few words was dubbed flash fiction in 1992. The six-word limit in particular has spawned the concept of Six-Word Memoirs.

== See also ==
- Found poetry
- Haiku
- Iceberg theory
- Minimalism
