= Orange Is the New Black: My Year in a Women's Prison =

2010 memoir by Piper Kerman

- Author: Piper Kerman
- Language: English
- Genre: Memoir
- Published: April 6, 2010
- Publisher: Spiegel & Grau
- Publication place: United States
- Pages: 327
- ISBN: 978-0-812-98618-1

Orange Is the New Black: My Year in a Women's Prison (titled Orange Is the New Black: My Time in a Women's Prison in some editions) is a 2010 memoir by American author Piper Kerman, which tells the story of her money laundering and drug trafficking conviction and subsequent year spent in a federal women's prison.

The book was the inspiration for the Netflix comedy-drama series Orange Is the New Black.

== Background ==
The memoir details the events that occur as a result of Piper Kerman's involvement with Nora Jansen (Catherine Cleary Wolters in real life), a former friend, lover, and drug smuggler. In 1993, shortly after her graduation from Smith College, Kerman agreed to accompany Jansen on several trips to Asia and Europe, going as far as carrying a suitcase of laundered money across the Atlantic Ocean before returning to San Francisco to "piece her life back together". In May 1998, Kerman was visited by two Customs agents and six years later was sentenced to 15 months in federal prison. After serving time in three different facilities (FCI Danbury, FTC Oklahoma City, and MCC Chicago), Kerman was released in March 2005.

The title is based on the snowclone "the new black", and on the fact that in the United States, prisoners are thought to wear orange prison uniforms.

== Reception ==
Sasha Abramsky of the Columbia Journalism Review stated that the book "documents the author’s attempts to preserve her individuality in the face of a gray, impersonal bureaucracy—one based around prisoner counts, strip searches, rules governing the minutiae of life, and continual reminders that prisoners, by definition, have no power, no real autonomy." Abramsky wrote that the book is mostly "a journey of self-discovery, describing how one can find one’s true strengths during moments of adversity" and that it "is more similar to South African anti-apartheid activist Albie Sachs's Jail Diary than it is to, say, Mumia Abu-Jamal’s denunciatory communiqués from Pennsylvania’s death row."

In her review for Slate, Jessica Grose argued that the book is not an examination of women within prison, but rather belongs to the middle-class-transgression genre, in which women from more privileged social classes go into situations which are considered degrading. She said that the book should have included Kerman's insight into her own behavior and "a bit of this moral ambiguity would have helped Kerman's memoir a whole lot." June Thomas, also from Slate, cited Grose's review and added that "ultimately, though, the book feels like a well-written, readable stage in Kerman’s rehabilitation." Thomas stated that the television show had improved on the book by expanding on Kerman's descriptions of real people and turning them into compelling fictional characters.

Writing in the Journal-Advocate, Tricia Ketchum called the book "not your typical 'I survived prison memoir'", referring to Kerman as "spoiled" as she received multiple care packages and money into her commissary. Ketchum concludes, "The best part of this book is the message that it leaves you with: No matter what choices you make, you never realize just how much they will impact the lives of those around you until it is too late."

The book was selected by the UC Santa Barbara Library as its 2015 book for the university-wide reading program "UCSB Reads".

== See also ==
- Incarceration of women in the United States
- My Companions in the Bleak House
- Prison uniform, some are orange jumpsuits
