= Federal Correctional Institution, Danbury =

Low-security federal prison in Danbury, Connecticut, US

Coordinates: 41.4369°N 73.4683°W

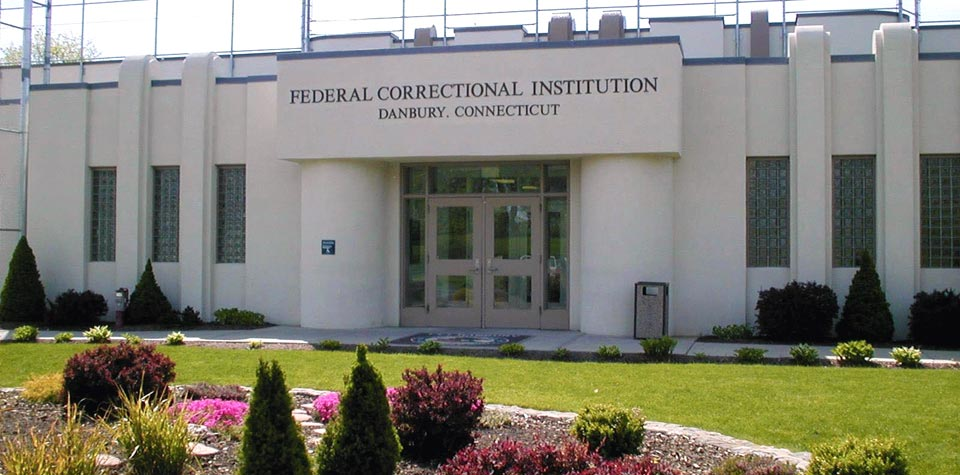
- Interactive map of Federal Correctional Institution, Danbury
- Location: Danbury, Fairfield County, Connecticut
- Status: Operational
- Security class: Low-security (with minimum-security prison camp)
- Population: 793 (46 in prison camp)
- Opened: 1940
- Managed by: Federal Bureau of Prisons

The Federal Correctional Institution, Danbury (FCI Danbury) is a low-security United States federal prison for male and female inmates in Danbury, Connecticut. It is operated by the Federal Bureau of Prisons, a division of the United States Department of Justice. The facility also has an adjacent satellite prison camp that houses minimum-security female offenders.

== History ==
FCI Danbury was opened in August 1940 with the purpose of housing male and female inmates. It housed several high-profile prisoners during World War II. Conscientious objectors, including poet Robert Lowell and civil rights activist James Peck, were housed there for refusing to enter the military draft in the early 1940s. Robert Henry Best served most of his life sentence at FCI Danbury after being convicted of treason in 1948 for making propaganda broadcasts for the Nazis during the war. Screenwriter Ring Lardner Jr., a member of the Hollywood 10, a group of filmmakers who were charged with contempt of Congress in 1947 for refusing to answer questions regarding their alleged connections with the Communist Party USA, served nine months there.

Beginning in the 1970s, Yale Law School began providing legal services for prisoners at FCI Danbury. As of the 2010s, Yale students and professors still regularly visit the facility.

FCI Danbury became exclusively for female inmates in 1993. This was because there was a lack of space for women in the Northeastern United States and due to the growth in the number of female prisoners.

In August 2013, the Federal Bureau of Prisons announced that FCI Danbury was going to be reverted to an all-male facility to alleviate overcrowding across the entire federal prison system. The female inmate population will be transferred to the Federal Correctional Institution, Aliceville in Alabama, which opened in 2013 and has over 1,500 low-security beds for female inmates. It was estimated that the change would be completed by December 2013. However, female inmates were not transferred to other facilities until April 2014.

FCI Danbury and its camp were the only federal prisons in the Northeast which housed women, and the repurposing would further promote an imbalance of women's prisoner space within the BOP system. In August 2013, 11 senators from the Northeast sent a letter to the BOP director criticizing the move, since it would mean there would be no facility for female federal prisoners from the Northeast; the move would mean that all of the women would be far from their families and loved ones. In November of that year several senators announced that at FCI Danbury the BOP would install a new low security camp for women and convert an existing minimum security camp into a low security camp for women to remedy the issue. As of August 2014 there was no timeline for the installation of the new women's facilities, no new construction had yet occurred at FCI Danbury. U.S. citizens would be eligible for the camps, but non-U.S. citizens would still be incarcerated farther away. As of that time there were no federal women's prisons left in the Northeast. Orange Is the New Black: My Year in a Women's Prison writer Piper Kerman criticized the move in an op-ed in The New York Times. A new $25 million women's facility was completed and began accepting female inmates in December 2016.

In July 2024, former White House chief strategist Steve Bannon began serving a four month prison sentence at the facility for a contempt of Congress conviction.

== Location and facilities ==
FCI Danbury is located in southwestern Connecticut, approximately 55 miles (89 km) from New York City, 60 miles (97 km) from Hartford, Connecticut, and 150 miles (240 km) from Boston, Massachusetts.

The facility is accessible to a MetroNorth station fewer than 4 miles (6.4 km) from the facility. Four Amtrak stations are within 30 miles (48 km) from the facility.

The prison had at one point included athletic facilities such as a running track, a soccer field, handball courts, a baseball diamond, and a handball field, since there is a large amount of outdoor area in the FCI Danbury property.

== Programs ==
Prior to the facility's conversion it offered General Education Development (GED) programs, paralegal classes, a group therapy program for people with post-traumatic stress disorder called the "Bridge Program", and a residential drug abuse program. The prison chaplain, religious groups, and volunteer groups had offered educational and other programming. In addition, prior to 1999 the prison hosted a "children's day" so inmates could spend time with their children.

== Notable incidents ==
=== Deadly 1977 fire ===
On July 7, 1977, at about 1:15 am, a fire began in an inmate's clothes hanging on wooden pegs in one of the prison washrooms, and before it was extinguished about 45 minutes later, five inmates had died of smoke inhalation. The most significant factors contributing to the deadly fire were the presence of fuels that promoted rapid flame and smoke development, the failure to evacuate occupants quickly and reliably (the two primary exits were blocked by the fire and a broken key in a lock, leaving a narrow catwalk as the only exit), and the fire not being extinguished in an incipient stage. An automatic sprinkler system would have been the most reliable fire defense; however, even without automatic detection and suppression equipment, the fire safety system, with little expenditure of money, could have been more effective by revisions to emergency procedures in the fire plan. The Danbury Fire Department was not called until about 15 minutes after the fire's discovery because of a fire plan that called for initial use of the institution's firefighting resources, but the inmate fire brigade was never released from housing units and the institution's fire apparatus was never used. The ensuing public outcry led to several investigations and reviews of the prison's fire safety systems and protocols. A comprehensive program of fuel control, additional fire detection and suppression equipment, and training and planning sessions have also been established, not only at FCI Danbury but throughout the rest of the federal prison system.

=== Correction officer Michael Rudkin ===
In 2008, supervisory staff at FCI Danbury discovered that correction officer Michael Rudkin had been engaging in sexual relations with a female inmate. When questioned, Rudkin, who was married at the time, admitted to the affair and stated that it had been going on for approximately one year. An FBI and United States Department of Justice Office of the Inspector General (OIG) investigation revealed that Rudkin had sexual encounters with other inmates as well. Since it is illegal for prison staff to have sexual relations with inmates under their care regardless of consent, Rudkin pleaded guilty to sexual abuse of a ward and was sentenced to prison at the United States Penitentiary, Coleman, a high-security facility in Florida.

Rudkin was subsequently convicted in 2010 of attempting to hire a hitman to kill his former inmate paramour, his ex-wife, his ex-wife's new boyfriend, and an OIG special agent assigned to his case while at USP Coleman. He was sentenced to 90 years in federal prison. Rudkin was severely beaten at the United States Penitentiary, Terre Haute on August 23, 2021 and died the following day at the age of 56.

== COVID-19 home confinement controversy and lawsuit ==
In 2020, during the COVID-19 pandemic, FCI Danbury faced criticism for its handling of home confinement under Attorney General William Barr's directive to reduce prison populations. Inmates were initially told they would be released, only to have the decision reversed, while others were held in high-security areas for weeks awaiting paperwork. The allegations of mismanagement led to a class-action lawsuit against the prison’s warden and BOP Director Michael Carvajal, claiming inadequate COVID-19 protections for medically vulnerable inmates.

U.S. District Judge Michael P. Shea ruled that officials’ actions may have violated the Eighth Amendment's ban on cruel and unusual punishment, ordering an expedited review of eligible inmates for release. A later settlement required the Bureau of Prisons to properly identify and release vulnerable prisoners. The lawsuit, backed by legal teams from Quinnipiac and Yale law schools, highlighted ongoing failures in medical care, COVID-19 testing, and home confinement implementation at FCI Danbury.

== In popular culture ==
The fictional Litchfield Prison in Upstate New York in the Netflix original television series Orange Is the New Black is based in part on FCI Danbury, where Piper Kerman, who wrote the memoir on which the series is based, was incarcerated in 2004 and 2005 after her conviction for money laundering and drug trafficking.

George Jung served a sentence at FCI Danbury. His incarceration was portrayed in the 2001 film Blow starring Johnny Depp.

The Weeds character Nancy Botwin serves time at FCI Danbury.

The Suits character Mike Ross begins Season 6 of the television show in FCI Danbury.

Gina Zanetakos of The Blacklist was incarcerated at FCI Danbury before she escaped.

In the 1995 movie The American President, Presidential Assistant Lewis Rothschild (played by Michael J. Fox) says "Say what you want. It's always the guy in my job that ends up doing 18 months in Danbury minimum security prison."

In season 6 of The Sopranos, the character John "Johnny Sacks" Sacramoni, the head of the New York mafia family (played by Vincent Curatola), was incarcerated at FCI Danbury.

In the 2023 series White House Plumbers, G. Gordon Liddy (played by Justin Theroux) is promised he’ll serve the prison sentence for his role in the Watergate break-ins at FCI Danbury.

== Notable inmates ==
Inmate name	Register number	Photo	Status	Details
Steve Bannon	05635-509		Turned himself in on Monday, 1 July 2024. Released October 2024.	Bannon was a key adviser to Trump's 2016 presidential campaign, then served as his chief White House strategist during 2017. Bannon is not the first former top official from Trump's White House to go to prison. Peter Navarro, a former Trump trade adviser, went to prison after being given a four-month sentence. President Trump in 2021 pardoned Bannon on federal criminal charges accusing him of swindling Trump supporters involving an effort to raise private funds to build a wall on the Mexico–United States border.
Leona Helmsley	15113-054		Released from custody in 1994; served 21 months.	Upscale hotel owner and leading real estate investor in New York City; convicted of tax evasion in 1989 for failing to pay $1.7 million in taxes from 1983 to 1985; known as the "Queen of Mean" for her tyrannical management style.
Sun Myung Moon	03835-054		Released from custody in 1985; served 11 months.	Leader of the Unification Church; convicted of tax evasion in 1982; the United States v. Sun Myung Moon serves as a landmark case involving taxes and religious organizations.
Lauryn Hill	64600-050		Released from custody in 2013; served 3 months.	Grammy Award–winning singer and actress; pleaded guilty in 2012 to not reporting over $2.3 million in income by intentionally failing to file tax returns for five years.
Piper Kerman	11187-424		Released from custody in 2005; served 13 months.	Pleaded guilty to money laundering in 1998; authored Orange Is the New Black: My Year in a Women's Prison (2010), which chronicles her time at FCI Danbury; the Netflix television series Orange Is the New Black is based on Kerman's book.
Teresa Giudice	65703-050		Served a 15-month sentence; released on December 23, 2015, after serving 12 months.	Star of the Bravo television show Real Housewives of New Jersey; she and her husband, Joe Giudice, pleaded guilty in 2014 to bankruptcy fraud and mail fraud for lying to banks and hiding assets in order to avoid paying taxes on $1 million; Joe Giudice received 41 months.
Alexander Salvagno	11212-052		Was serving a 17-year sentence; compassionately released on April 23, 2020.	Former owner of Evergreen Resources, a fertilizer manufacturer; convicted in 1999 of ordering employees to handle and dispose of cyanide waste without required safety measures; received the longest sentence ever imposed for an environmental crime.
Ryan Michael Reavis	25912-508		Served part of a 10 year and 11 month sentence; currently at Montgomery FPC; scheduled for release in 2028.	Convicted for distributing fentanyl to hip-hop artist/producer Mac Miller which contributed to his death in 2018.
Robert Lowell			Served several months	Pulitzer Prize winner for Poetry in 1947, was a conscientious objector during World War II
Sister Ardeth Platte	10857-039		Imprisoned until December 22, 2005; served 29 months	Dominican nun and antiwar activist; convicted of breaking into and defacing a Colorado LGM-30 Minuteman missile silo.
Cheng Chui Ping	05117-055		Transferred to a facility in Texas, died in 2014	Also known as Sister Ping. Ran a human smuggling operation from New York City and Hong Kong from 1984 until 2000, when she was arrested in Hong Kong, extradited back to the United States.
Bob Jones			Released in January 1970.	Grand Dragon of the North Carolina Knights of the Ku Klux Klan; sentenced to a year in prison for contempt of Congress (refused to answer questions or provide records to the House Un-American Activities Committee as part of its investigation into Klan activity).
Ring Lardner Jr.			Served 9 months	An award-winning screenwriter sentenced to one year in prison in 1950 for contempt of Congress after appearing before the House Un-American Activities Committee in 1947 and refusing to answer questions about possible Communist affiliations.
James Peck			Released in 1945 after serving 3 years	An activist and conscientious objector who served a three-year stint in Danbury in the 1940s after refusing to serve in World War II. During his time in Danbury, Peck helped start a work strike that led to the desegregation of the prison's mess hall.
Michael Mancuso	04640-748		Sentenced to 15 years in 2008, released in 2019 after serving 153 months (12 years 9 months).	Mafia boss from New York, convicted of orchestrating the murder of a rival mafia member.
Karl Sebastian Greenwood	76231-054		Serving a 20-year sentence; scheduled for release on November 15, 2035.	Co-founder of a massive fraud scheme called OneCoin. In September 2023, Greenwood was sentenced to a 20-year federal prison term (minus 5-years already served).
Caroline Ellison	36854-510		Serving a 2-year sentence; release date July 20, 2026.	Former CEO of Alameda Research and ex-girlfriend of Sam Bankman-Fried; pleaded guilty to fraud and other crimes in the FTX scandal.
Guo Wengui	49134-510		Serving a 30-year sentence; scheduled for release on October 6, 2048.	Former Chinese businessman. Convicted of various charges from wire fraud, securities fraud, bank fraud, and money laundering.

== See also ==
- List of U.S. federal prisons
- Federal Bureau of Prisons
- Incarceration of women in the United States
