= Barry Golson =

American editor and author

- Education: Yale University (Class of 1967)
- Occupations: Author, editor
- Writing career
- Language: English
- Genres: Lifestyle, Popular culture, Travel writing
- Notable works: Playboy, Yahoo! Internet Life

Barry Golson is an American editor and author. He was executive editor of Playboy magazine for twelve years, and of TV Guide for five years.

== Career ==
Golson was executive editor of Playboy magazine from 1977 to 1989. During that time he edited The Playboy Interviews with John Lennon and Yoko Ono and The Playboy Interview, both originally published in 1981, as well as The Playboy Interview Volume II, published in 1983, featuring interviews from the magazine's first two decades.

Golson also served as editor-in-chief for World Press Review, executive editor for TV Guide, editor-in-chief of TV Guide Online (an electronic version of the magazine's television listings), and editor-in-chief of Yahoo! Internet Life. He has written for publications including The New York Times, Los Angeles Times and Salon.

In 2006, he authored Gringos in Paradise and, two years later, Retirement Without Borders, both detailing his life as an expatriate.

In 2020, Golson began writing editorial columns for the Tampa Bay Times, covering such topics as politics, culture, love, family and survival in the age of COVID-19.

== Published works ==
=== Editor ===
- The Playboy Interview (1981)
- The Playboy Interviews with John Lennon and Yoko Ono (1981)
- The Playboy Interview Volume II (1983)

=== Author ===
- Gringos in Paradise (2006)
- Retirement Without Borders (2008)
- Passing Wind of Love: A Hysterical Historical Romance (2014), with John Blumenthal
