= Yahoo Internet Life =

US magazine

August 2000 issue of Yahoo! Internet Life

Yahoo! Internet Life was a monthly magazine published by Ziff Davis, which licensed the name from Yahoo!, the well-known web portal and search engine website. It was created and launched by G. Barry Golson, the former executive editor of Playboy and TV Guide. The magazine was published 1996–2002, and focused on the emerging Internet and computer culture of the late 1990s and early 2000s.

== History ==
The forerunner of Yahoo! Internet Life was started in 1995, when Ziff Davis invested in Yahoo! and subsequently published just one issue of ZD Internet Life (Vol.1 No.1 Fall 1995). In 1996, along with other publications, Dan Rosensweig led the relaunch of the magazine as Yahoo! Internet Life(first issue was Vol 2. No.1 Spring 1996)– which had been retooled by Golson –before being appointed Yahoo! COO, in 2002, with Golson serving as editor-in-chief until the magazine's demise in 2002. The magazine featured regular columns by film critic Roger Ebert, and others, and published many reviews of a variety of webpages and tech gadgets. Yahoo! Internet Life explored potentially controversial tech-related issues such as pornography and peer-to-peer technology.

== Alumni ==
Alanis Morissette appeared (apparently topless, with strategically crossed hands) on the cover of its August 2000 "Music Blowout" issue. Its closure was announced in July 2002, and its last issue was published that August.

In addition to editor-in-chief Golson, other editors included Angela Gunn, Lisa Holzer, Derek Baker, Beth Lipton, Stevan Keane, Ben Greenman, Larry Smith, David Thomas, Ron Bel Bruno, Bilge Ebiri, and Rob Bernstein. The design director was Gail Ghezzi.
