= Might (magazine) =

San Francisco-based magazine existed between 1994 and 1997

Might was a San Francisco-based magazine that existed between 1994 and 1997.

== History and profile ==
Might was co-founded in 1994 by David Moodie, Marny Requa and Dave Eggers, who went on to describe the magazine's rise and fall in his bestselling memoir A Heartbreaking Work of Staggering Genius. The first issue appeared in the spring of 1994. With its name meant to suggest both "power" and "possibility," the magazine might be summarized as an effort by twentysomethings to say something instead of nothing. Might went out of business in July 1997, but back issues are still available through the Website of Eggers's writing organization, 826 Valencia.

== Featured topics ==
1. Double Fabulous Know-it-all Issue
2. For the Love of Cheese
3. Intimacy, AIDS, and the Moment
4. Is This Local TV News or Is This Satan's Parlor?
5. Adam Rich
6. Raising Hell
7. Vindicated at Last
8. The Millennium Issue
9. Spring Wedding Spectacular
10. Are Black People Cooler Than White People?

The editors/writers/publishers of Might did not take themselves or the world too seriously. Entire issues poked fun at someone or another, focusing mainly on celebrities and has-beens and actors who have been in TV commercials that no one has seen before. According to A Heartbreaking Work of Staggering Genius, one such topic considered by editors was a memorial to Crispin Glover. After initially accepting to participate, Glover backed out at the last minute, citing concerns that he would not be able to let his family know he had not actually died. The Might editorial staff instead got former Eight Is Enough actor Adam Rich to go along with the scheme, fabricating a story that Rich had been murdered.
