= Bob Garfield =

American journalist and commentator

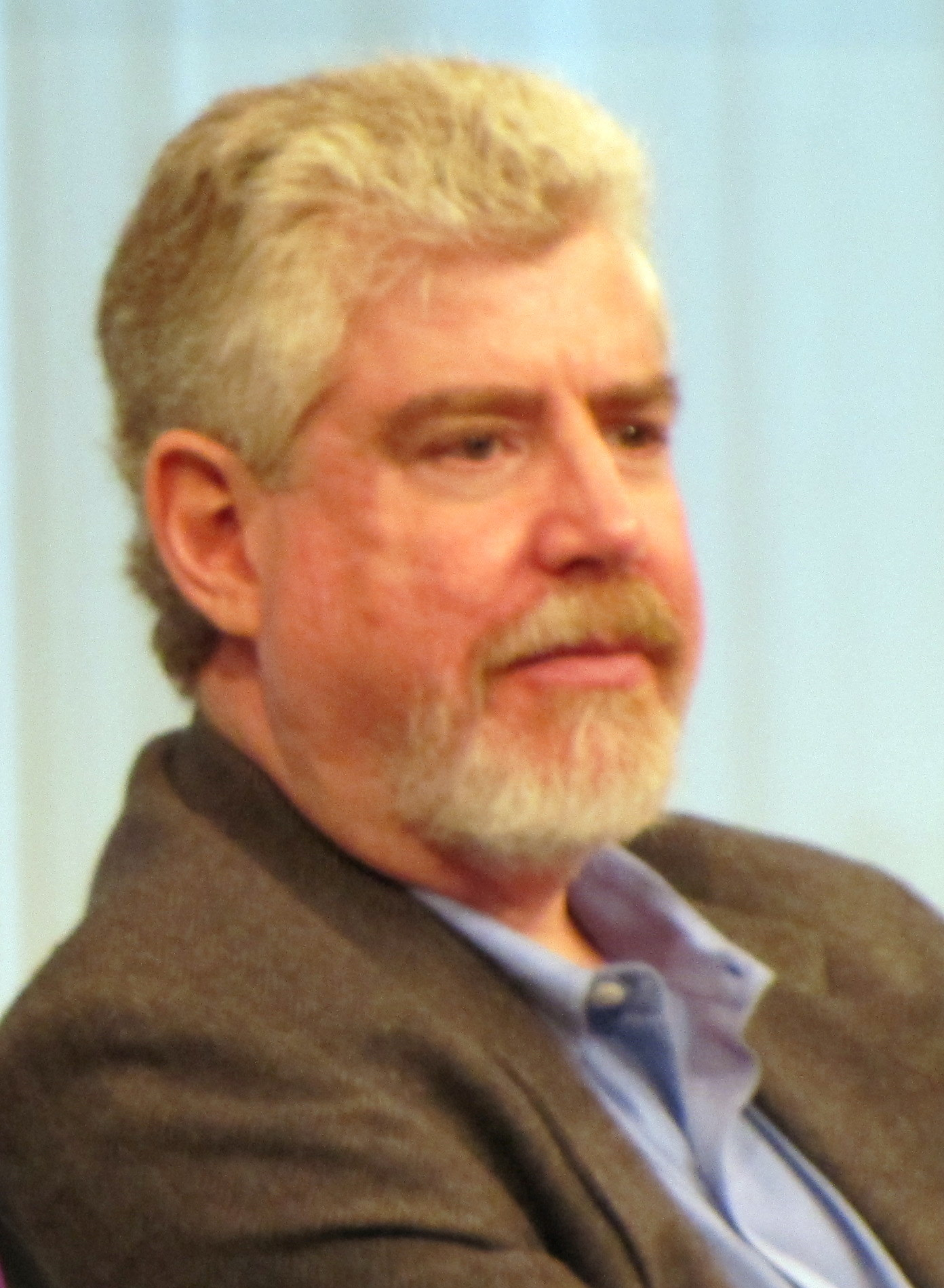
- Garfield in 2009
- Occupations: Journalist, commentator
- Known for: former co-host of On the Media
- Spouse(s): Carla Cain (1977–2000); Milena Trobozić (2000–present)
- Children: 3

Robert Garfield is an American journalist and commentator, and the host of Bully Pulpit from Booksmart Studios. He is former co-host of On the Media from WNYC. He is also the host of The Genius Dialogues from Audible. Until 2010, he wrote the "Ad Review" TV-commercial criticism feature in Advertising Age. From 1986 to 1999, Garfield was a roving correspondent for All Things Considered and was a longtime advertising analyst for ABC News.

== Career ==
Garfield began his career as a reporter for the Reading Times from 1977 to 1981. He has been a columnist for USA Today and contributing editor for Civilization and The Washington Post magazine. He wrote the "AdReview" column in Advertising Age from 1985 to 2010. He has also written for The New York Times, Playboy, Sports Illustrated, Wired, and many other publications.

A collection of his work, titled Waking Up Screaming from the American Dream, was published by Scribner's in 1997. A second book, And Now a Few Words from Me, appeared in 2003. Garfield co-wrote "Tag, You're It", a country song performed on NPR by Willie Nelson, and wrote an episode of the situation comedy Sweet Surrender. In 2009, he published a book about the collapse of the media landscape called The Chaos Scenario. His first novel, Bedfellows, was published in October 2012. In 2013, he co-authored a non-fiction book with Doug Levy called Can't Buy Me Like.

In October 2007, Garfield launched Comcast Must Die, a customer-service platform of last resort for disgruntled Comcast subscribers.

Garfield co-hosted the radio program and podcast On the Media with Brooke Gladstone from 2001 until 2021. It covers journalism and media criticism. He also hosts the podcast The Genius Dialogues, presented by Audible Inc., in which he interviews winners of the MacArthur Fellows Program (often called "Genius Grants").

In 2012, Garfield co-founded a podcast about the English language called Lexicon Valley, presented by Slate, with producer Mike Vuolo. In the January 2, 2013, episode on "creaky voice" in young females, Garfield criticized the phenomenon in emphatic terms. The episode was the most listened to by a factor of ten and brought strong disapproval on Garfield from some sources. Garfield and Vuolo hosted the podcast until 2016, when both left the podcast to pursue other projects.

In 2015, Garfield founded the Media Future Summit at Wharton, an annual gathering of high-level executives, owners and academics aimed at addressing the flailing media economy. He is a senior fellow at the Wharton Future of Advertising Program, SEI Center for Advanced Studies in Management at the University of Pennsylvania. He has been a Professor of Practice at Penn and a Distinguished Visiting Faculty in Media Ecology at Berlin School of Creative Leadership.

In 2021, New York Public Radio fired Garfield, saying he had violated the station's anti-bullying policy. Station officials cited a pattern of behavior uncovered by an independent investigator. Station management issued Garfield a warning in 2020 but the behavior persisted, officials said. Garfield said the behavior amounted to two instances of yelling at meetings, in both cases as a response to "provocation [that] was extraordinary and simply shocking".

== Personal life ==
Garfield was raised in a Jewish family in Bala Cynwyd, Pennsylvania, "a hometown of my youth". He lives in Potomac, Maryland. He is married to Milena Trobozić; they have three daughters.

== Works ==
- Waking Up Screaming from the American Dream, Scribner's, 1997. ISBN 9780684832180
- And Now a Few Words from Me: advertising's leading critic lays down the law, once and for all New York; London : McGraw-Hill, 2003. ISBN 9780071441223
- The Chaos Scenario. Nashville, Tenn.: Stielstra Publishing, 2009. ISBN 9780984065103
- Bedfellows, Las Vegas, NV : Thomas & Mercer, 2012. ISBN 9781612183961
- Doug Levy, Can't Buy Me Like, Portfolio, 2013. ISBN 9781591845775
- American Manifesto: Saving Democracy from Villains, Vandals, and Ourselves, Berkeley, California: Counterpoint, 2020. ISBN 9781640092808

== Honors and awards ==
In 1997, Garfield's "Ad Review" won a Jesse H. Neal Award for best column.

Garfield's work with On the Media has won several awards. In 2003, he received the National Press Club's Arthur Rowse Award for Media Criticism in Best Body of Work, TV and Radio and an Edward R. Murrow Award from the Radio Television Digital News Association for investigative journalism. In 2004, On the Media won a Peabody Award for excellence. In both 2012 and 2013, the show won the Bart Richards Award for Media Criticism from the College of Communications at Penn State. In 2015, he won a Mirror Award for Best Single Story for the On the Media episode "OTM Goes Inside Washington".
