= A.D.: New Orleans After the Deluge =

Non-fiction graphic novel by Josh Neufeld

- The cover to Pantheon's hardcover edition of A.D.
- Author: Josh Neufeld
- Cover artist: Josh Neufeld
- Language: English
- Subject: Hurricane Katrina
- Genre: Comics, New journalism
- Publisher: Smith Magazine (webcomic); Pantheon Graphic Novels (book)
- Publication date: 2007–2008 (webcomic); 2009 (book)
- Publication place: United States
- Media type: Webcomic, hardcover, paperback
- Pages: 208
- ISBN: 0-307-37814-4
- OCLC: 277201932
- Preceded by: A Few Perfect Hours: and Other Stories from Southeast Asia & Central Europe
- Followed by: The Influencing Machine

A.D.: New Orleans After the Deluge is a non-fiction graphic novel by cartoonist Josh Neufeld. Originally published as a webcomic, A.D. tells the stories of a handful of real-life New Orleans residents and their experiences during and after Hurricane Katrina. The graphic novel was a New York Times best-seller and was nominated for an Eisner Award and a Harvey Award in 2010. In addition, A.D. was selected for inclusion in The Best American Comics 2010.

In A.D., author Neufeld draws upon interviews with the actual people represented in the story; newspaper, magazine, and blog accounts of the events surrounding Hurricane Katrina and its effects on New Orleans; and his own experiences as a Red Cross volunteer in the weeks after the storm.

== Publication history ==
A.D. was serialized as a webcomic on SMITH Magazine in 2007–2008. The web version of A.D. utilizes the Internet in a variety of interesting ways to expand the scope of the story beyond the comic itself. Many pages and panels have links to outside sources such as audio and video clips, newspapers stories, photo essays, and the like. The A.D. website also features audio & video clips from the characters, a blogroll, a resource library, and a blog (in addition to a comments section for each chapter.) (The shorter web version of A.D. continues to live on the SMITH website.)

The hardcover edition of A.D. was released by Pantheon Graphic Novels on August 18, 2009, shortly before Hurricane Katrina's fourth anniversary. It went on to become a New York Times bestseller. A.D. came out in paperback, with a new cover, and a new afterword, in the summer of 2010, on the fifth anniversary of Hurricane Katrina.

A Dutch translation of A.D. was published in 2010, and a French translation was published in 2012.

== The characters ==
- Denise, a sixth-generation New Orleanian with a master's degree in guidance and counseling. When Katrina strikes, she is living with her mother, Louise (a surgical tech at Memorial Baptist Hospital), her niece Cydney, and Cydney's daughter, R’nae, in an apartment above a boxing club in Mid-City.
- The Doctor, a medical man-about-town based in the French Quarter and often found at the legendary Galatoire's restaurant. Although personally unaffected by Katrina, The Doctor stays behind after the storm, setting up a street clinic to help tend to relief workers and refugees.
- Abbas (Hamid in the webcomic), Iranian-born, long-time New Orleanian, father of two, and owner of a family-run supermarket in Uptown who faces the storm with his friend Darnell (Mansell in the webcomic). Abbas and Darnell weather the storm in Abbas's convenience store. But when the power goes out and the water starts to rise, the two men realize they are literally in over their heads.
- Kwame (Kevin in the webcomic), son of a pastor from New Orleans East, who is just entering his senior year of high school as Katrina strikes. Fleeing to Tallahassee with his family the day before the storm, Kwame is shocked by the devastation left behind. His parents send him to live with a family friend in Berkeley, California, to finish high school. Like thousands of other Katrina refugees, Kwame faces the future in alien surroundings.
- Leo and Michelle, twenty-somethings who each grew up in the city. He's a local music zine publisher and works with mentally challenged youth. She's a waitress and gymnastics instructor. After evacuating to Houston, Texas, they learn that their apartment took at least five feet of water. Leo's entire 15,000-strong comic book collection is ruined, and the couple face many hard choices about returning and rebuilding.

== Plot ==
=== Webcomic ===
The online version of the story encompasses a two-part prologue, 13 chapters, and an epilogue — 15 chapters in total. In the prologue, from a "God's eye" perspective, A.D. shows Hurricane Katrina as it builds from a tropical storm in the Bahamas and moves inexorably toward New Orleans. Katrina slams into the Gulf Coast. Winds and rain lash New Orleans and Biloxi, Mississippi. The levees burst and the city is flooded.

Going back in time to more than a week before the storm, readers meet the protagonists in their pre-Katrina lives. Then in the days leading up to the hurricane, the characters learn about the approaching monster storm. On the Saturday before the hurricane, Leo tracks the storm on his computer as he and Michelle decide whether to evacuate. Meanwhile, The Doctor makes plans to host some friends at his French Quarter home for a “hurricane party.” On Sunday, August 28, 2005, one day before Katrina, Hamid sends his wife and family off to safety in Houston. Kevin helps his family prepare to evacuate to Tallahassee. Denise goes with her niece and grandniece to take shelter at the hospital where her mother works, but when they are turned away from a private room due to overcrowding, she angrily returns to her apartment alone. Leo and Michelle spend hours in bumper-to-bumper traffic to Houston, while Kevin and his family do the same en route to Tallahassee. Meanwhile, Hamid and Mansell excitedly outfit themselves for the storm at Hamid's store.

Monday, August 29. As the storm's pre-winds batter New Orleans, The Doctor's hurricane party is in full swing. Hamid and Mansell hunker down at the store. When the full force of the hurricane hits, Denise learns just what a mistake it was to forsake the refuge of the hospital for her apartment. Her apartment is shaken repeatedly by the storm, the ceiling in the bedroom comes down, and she spends the night holding onto a bed wedged in the hallway. We also check in on Kevin and his family in Tallahassee, and Leo and Michelle in Houston. No one is yet aware that the levees have been breached.

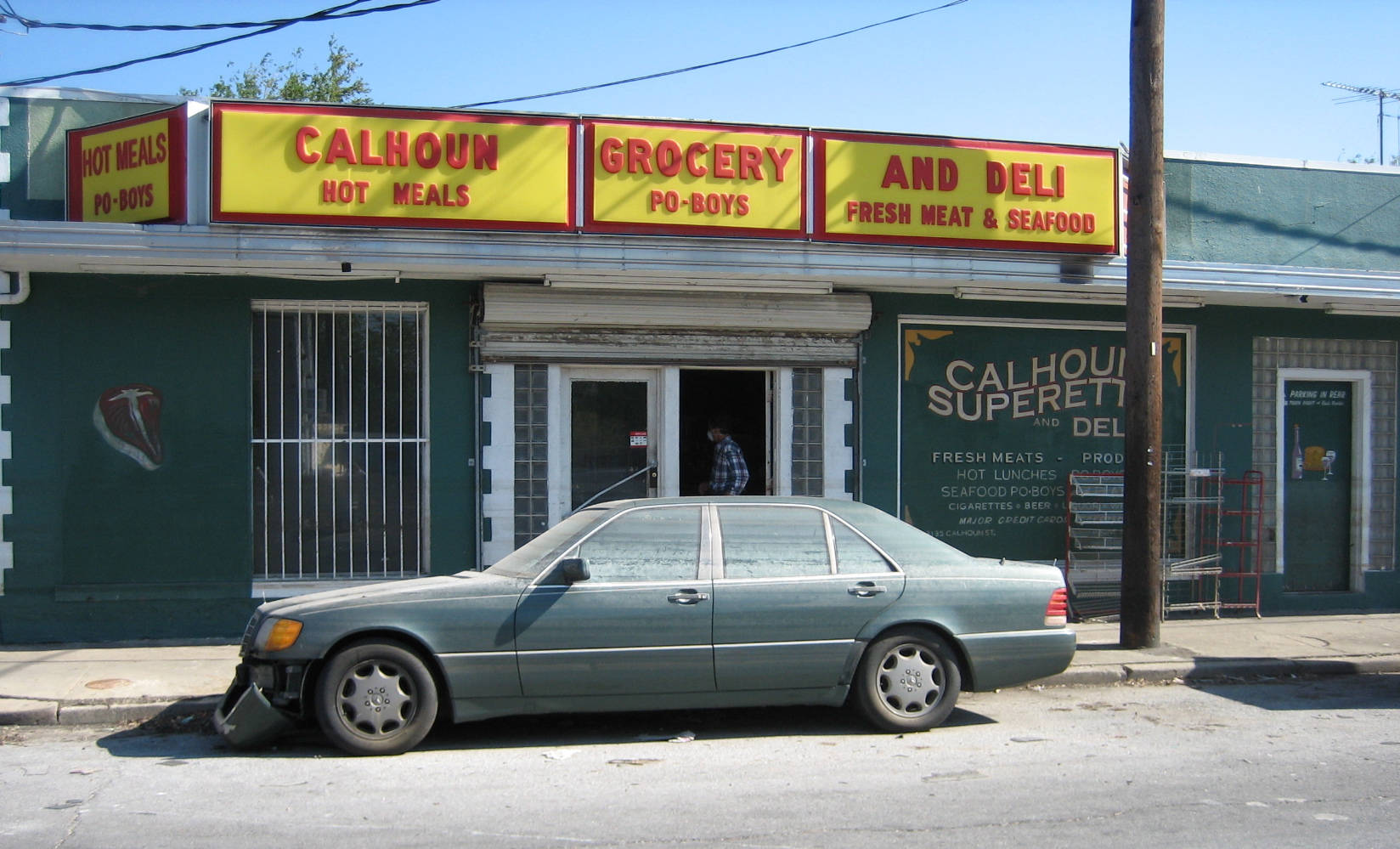
Calhoun Grocery, one of the settings of A.D.: New Orleans After the Deluge

Tuesday, August 30. Katrina has finally passed New Orleans, and Hamid and Mansell emerge, blinking in the sunlight, ecstatic to have survived the storm. But then the flooding begins. Reluctant to abandon the store and fearful of looters, the two men stand fast in the rising waters.

Wednesday, August 31. Hamid and Mansell wake up from a long night on the roof of Hamid's maintenance shed. They spend the day wading through the chest-high waters, refusing a boat ride out of the flooded sections of the city. Denise and her family, having momentarily escaped the flooding, await transport out of the flooded city. What they find instead is a van to the Convention Center. In Houston, Leo and Michelle are dismayed to discover that their neighborhood took over five feet of water. The Doctor makes the rounds of the French Quarter, administering aid where needed. Hamid and Mansell deliver much-needed water to a trapped neighbor. And in Tallahassee, Kevin sees footage of the flooding and realizes he won't be returning home any time soon. Denise arrive at the Convention Center to find it completely without vital services, and filled with abandoned people. Mansell narrowly avoids being crushed by a bobbing refrigerator case. Mansell's asthma and the high water makes Hamid face the fact that they probably should evacuate the flooded city. In Houston, Leo & Michelle discuss what their next move should be. And in Tallahassee, Kevin learns that he and his younger brother will be sent off to California to attend school there.

Thursday, September 1. Three days after the hurricane and two days after the city began flooding. Denise and her family, having been dropped off at the New Orleans Convention Center, find themselves stranded and abandoned, surrounded by thousands of other refugees. And from there things only get worse. Denise and her family are still trapped at the New Orleans Convention Center. The NOLA police roll by in armored SWAT vehicles, with rifles loaded — but no food or water. This companion section to Chapter 12 tells the real story — from the perspective of the people who were there — of what went down at the Convention Center in the days after Hurricane Katrina.

In the epilogue, "Picking Up The Pieces," A.D. concluded its online run with a final look at all the characters. Picking up the story a year and a half after the hurricane, readers find out about Denise's escape from the Convention Center; Hamid & Mansell's rescue from the flooded store; Kevin's years-long odyssey; the Doctor's formation of the New Orleans Health Department in Exile; and Leo & Michelle's return to their flooded home. The epilogue concludes with a jump of another year ahead in time, to early 2008, and a final check-in with the Doctor, Leo, and Denise.

=== Book ===
The A.D. book includes 25% more story and art, as well as extensive revisions to the material from the webcomic. Other changes include dividing the book into five sections rather than 15 chapters, as well as the changing of some of the characters' names.

== Critical response ==
The A.D. webcomic received recognition from magazines, newspapers, and websites such as Newsweek, the Los Angeles Times, the New Orleans Times-Picayune, the Atlanta Journal-Constitution, Rolling Stone, BoingBoing, the Toronto Star, and National Public Radio's "News & Notes". USA Today’s "Pop Candy" named A.D. one of 2007's best comics, Wired.com called it “a sterling example of comics with a social conscience," and the New Orleans Gambit Weekly said "it took Josh Neufeld only 13 panels to storyboard New Orleans’ worst nightmare."

The 2009 hardcover edition of A.D. gained more critical recognition. The Los Angeles Times called the book "a work . . . of literature, of high art, and of reverence for nature and humanity." The book was covered by (among others) the New York Times, Newsweek, National Public Radio's "Tell Me More," the New Orleans Times-Picayune, USA Today, Salon.com, and the Wall Street Journal.

A.D. was selected by first-year reading programs at, among others, University of Wisconsin–Madison, Washington State University Vancouver, St. Edward's College, SUNY Brockport, Bunker Hill Community College, and Louisiana State University.

== Awards and recognition ==
A.D. was nominated for a 2010 Eisner Award (for Best Graphic Album—Reprint), a Harvey Award (for Best Previously Published Graphic Album), and a Harry Chapin Media Award (in the Book category). It was also a YALSA 2010 Great Graphic Novels for Teens selection. The A.D. hardcover was recognized on many top-ten lists for 2009. It was declared MTV's Best Nonfiction Comic of 2009, one of Vanity Fair magazine's top five books of 2009, and a Salon Critics' Pick. In addition, it was a Mother Jones magazine MoJo Top Book of 2009, and a Daily Beast recommended book.

A.D. was selected for inclusion in The Best American Comics 2010, guest-edited by Neil Gaiman.

In June 2026, the Library of Congress acquired the A.D. archives — including original artwork, preparatory drawings, scripts, and other documents — from Neufeld for its permanent collection.
