= Clear and hold =

Counter-insurgency military strategy

Clear and hold is a counter-insurgency strategy in which military personnel clear an area of guerrillas or other insurgents, and then keep the area clear of insurgents while winning the support of the populace for the government and its policies. As defined by the United States Army, "clear and hold" contains three elements: civil-military operations, combat operations, and information warfare. Only highly strategic areas are initially chosen for "clear and hold" operations; once they are secure, the operation gradually spreads to less strategic areas until the desired geographic unit (county, province, or nation) is under control. Once an area has been cleared, local police (rather than military) authority is re-established, and government authority re-asserted.

== Development and critical elements ==
The clear and hold strategy was first developed by Robert Thompson and the British Army during the Malayan Emergency, from 1948 to 1960. It was also widely employed by the British during the Mau Mau Uprising of 1952 to 1960. The strategy was also implemented by General Creighton Abrams, as part of the "pacification" effort conducted by the Republic of Vietnam and the US Army during the Vietnam War, at which time the strategy became widely known. Clear and hold has also been used as a counter-insurgency tactic in Algeria, Greece, the Philippines, and South Korea. The strategy was used extensively by the United States and its allies during the Iraq War.

Several critical elements of the clear and hold strategy have been identified. One element is to secure support for the strategy at all levels of the traditional military forces. Experience in Vietnam has shown that traditional military forces dislike the limited role they play in the clear and hold strategy and may successfully advocate for a more traditional war-making role. Another challenge is that the strategy takes time, which a government may lack for various reasons. The strategy also requires significant numbers of on-the-ground "clearing" combat and "holding" police forces. Thompson and others have also argued that clear and hold operations can be successful by only isolating the population from insurgents, but some strategists point out that can have deleterious effects on public support for the government and its policies.

== Assessment ==
The success of clear and hold as a counter-insurgency strategy is hotly debated. Military historian Lewis Sorley has argued that clear and hold tactics were markedly successful in the Vietnam War despite being implemented after a decade of conflict and under less than ideal conditions. His view is supported by others, who see the strategy as still viable in the 21st century.

While combat operations against insurgents are often successful, some authors conclude that combat operations themselves make it very difficult to win support for the government, "hold" operations are rarely successful, and guerrillas easily adapt. Others argue that the initial limited goals of clear and hold operations enable guerrilla forces to regroup militarily, limiting the combat effectiveness of the strategy. Some analysts have also voiced the concern that the strategy relies too heavily on physical security issues and ignores the role that ideology, nationalism, and other belief systems play in fomenting insurgency in the first place.

More recently, American military strategists in both Iraq and Afghanistan have proposed modifications to the strategy. Sometimes defined as "clear, hold and build" or "shape, clear, hold, and build," native forces identify the nature and strength of the enemy threat in a given area (shape), foreign and native forces defeat the enemy threat (clear), foreign and native forces keep the area clear of enemies (hold), and native democratic institutions are established that draw their legitimacy from the local people (build). Basic services such as electricity, sewer systems, fresh water, farms, and marketplaces were provided. By 2008, the strategy had "shown some results in Iraq." International affairs expert Anthony Cordesman has noted less success in Afghanistan, where many areas were still in the "shape", "clear", and "hold" stage after nine years, and only a few others in beginning, mixed "hold/build" stages. Journalist Fred Kaplan has argued that the revised doctrine is ethnocentric, capitalist, and materialistic and ignores such important beliefs as religion and cultural norms and institutions. Kaplan also concludes that too little discussion is given to local versus national government (especially regarding corruption and trustworthiness) and situations in which a majority of the population is on the side of the insurgents.

== See also ==
- List of established military terms

== Bibliography ==
- Asprey, Robert B. War in the Shadows: The Guerrilla in History. Bloomington, Ind.: iUniverse, 2002. ISBN 0-595-22594-2
- Bowman, Steve. War in Afghanistan: Strategy, Military Operations, and Issues for Congress. Darby, Pa.: DIANE Publishing, 2010. ISBN 978-1-4379-2698-9
- Collins, John M. Military Strategy: Principles, Practices, and Historical Perspectives. Washington, D.C.: Brassey's, 2002. ISBN 1-57488-430-1
- Elliott, David W. P. "Parallel Wars? Can 'Lessons of Vietnam' Be Applied to Iraq?" In Iraq and the Lessons of Vietnam, or, How Not to Learn From the Past. Lloyd C. Gardner and Marilyn Blatt Young, eds. New York: New Press, 2007. ISBN 1-59558-149-9
- Elliott, David W. P. The Vietnamese War: Revolution and Social Change in the Mekong Delta, 1930–1975. 2d ed. Armonk, N.Y.: M.E. Sharpe, 2007. ISBN 0-7656-0603-8
- Gettleman, Marvin E. Vietnam and America: A Documented History. 2d rev. ed. New York: Grove Press, 1995. ISBN 0-8021-3362-2
- Headquarters. Department of the Army. Counterinsurgency Operations. Washington, D.C.: Department of the Army, 2004. ISBN 7-116-69200-2
- Ignatius, David. "A Better Strategy For Iraq." The Washington Post. November 4, 2005.
- Joes, Anthony James. America and Guerrilla Warfare. Lexington, Ky.: University Press of Kentucky, 2004. ISBN 0-8131-9095-9
- Joes, Anthony James. The War for South Viet Nam, 1954–1975. 2d rev. ed. Santa Barbara, Calif.: Greenwood Publishing, 2001. ISBN 0-275-96806-5
- Kaiser, David E. American Tragedy: Kennedy, Johnson, and the Origins of the Vietnam War. Cambridge, Mass.: Harvard University Press, 2000. ISBN 0-674-00672-0
- Kaplan, Fred. The Insurgents: David Petraeus and the Plot to Change the American Way of War. New York: Simon & Schuster, 2012. ISBN 978-1-4516-4263-6
- Marston, Daniel and Malkasian, Carter. "Introduction." In Counterinsurgency in Modern Warfare. Daniel Marston and Carter Malkasian, eds. Westminster, Md.: Osprey Publishing, 2008. ISBN 1-84603-281-4
- Ricks, Thomas E. Fiasco: The American Military Adventure in Iraq. New York: Penguin Group, 2006. ISBN 1-59420-103-X
- Sorley, Lewis. A Better War: The Unexamined Victories and Final Tragedy of America's Last Years in Vietnam. New York: Houghton Mifflin Harcourt, 1999. ISBN 0-15-601309-6
- "South Viet Nam: To Clear & to Hold." Time. March 27, 1964.
- Taber, Robert. War of the Flea: The Classic Study of Guerrilla Warfare. Reprint ed. Washington, D.C.: Brassey's, 2002. ISBN 1-57488-555-3
- Thompson, Sir Robert. Defeating Communist Insurgency: Experiences from Malaya and Vietnam. New York: Palgrave Macmillan, 1978. ISBN 0-333-24825-2
- Trinquier, Roger. Modern Warfare: A French View of Counterinsurgency. Santa Barbara, Calif.: Greenwood Publishing Group, 2006. ISBN 0-275-99268-3
- Tuohy, William. "Ky's Army Switches to Pacification Role." Los Angeles Times. November 6, 1966.
- Walton, C. Dale. The Myth of Inevitable US Defeat in Vietnam. Florence, Ky.: Taylor & Francis, 2002. ISBN 0-7146-8191-1
- West, Bing. The Strongest Tribe: War, Politics, and the Endgame in Iraq. Reprint ed. New York: Random House, 2009. ISBN 0-8129-7866-8
- Woodward, Bob. State of Denial: Bush at War. Reprint ed. New York: Simon and Schuster, 2007. ISBN 0-7432-7224-2
- Young, Marilyn Blatt. The Vietnam Wars, 1945–1990. Reprint ed. New York: HarperCollins, 1991. ISBN 0-06-092107-2
