= Sari Wilson =

American novelist and writer

- Born: Saralyn Wilson; New York City, U.S.
- Education: Oberlin College (BA)
- Occupations: Writer, editor
- Spouse: Josh Neufeld
- Children: 1
- Writing career
- Notable work: Girl Through Glass
- Website: www.sariwilson.com

Sari Wilson is an American novelist and writer. She has written prose and comics, and is the author of the novel Girl Through Glass. Wilson's short fiction has been nominated for a Pushcart Prize and has appeared in literary journals such as AGNI, the Oxford American, and Slice. Her essays have appeared in The New York Times, New York magazine, and Catapult.

== Biography ==
Wilson was born in New York City and grew up in Brooklyn Heights. She studied ballet for many years, including with the Harkness Ballet and Eliot Feld's New Ballet School. She attended Packer Collegiate Institute and Oberlin College, graduating with a BA in history.

Wilson and her partner, the cartoonist Josh Neufeld, met at The Nation magazine. Later, they traveled through Southeast Asia and Central Europe, living for almost a year in Prague, the Czech Republic. Wilson spent this time abroad pursuing her interest in writing.

Upon returning to the United States, Wilson and Neufeld moved to Chicago, where she worked for three years as a research editor at Playboy magazine while continuing to hone her fiction writing.

Wilson was awarded a Wallace Stegner Fellowship in Creative Writing at Stanford University from 1997 to 1999, where she studied with Tobias Wolff, Elizabeth Tallent, and Gilbert Sorrentino. Following that experience, Wilson was awarded a Fine Arts Work Center residency in Cape Cod, Massachusetts, from 1999 to 2000. She was awarded a residency at Yaddo in 2011.

Wilson's short stories have been published in AGNI, Third Coast, and Slice, among others, and has been nominated for a Pushcart Prize. Her comics writing has been published in the Oxford American, Smith Magazine, and anthologized in The Big Feminist BUT and the Trina Robbins project, From Girls to Grrrlz: A History of Women’s Comics from Teens to Zines. Wilson was a co-writer of the motion comics elements of the American Broadcasting Company television program Earth 2100.

Wilson and Neufeld co-edited the comics and prose anthology Flashed: Sudden Stories in Comics and Prose, which features contributions from Junot Díaz, Lynda Barry, Sheila Heti, Gabrielle Bell, Kellie Wells, Nick Bertozzi, and many more authors.

Wilson's debut novel Girl Through Glass was published by Harper in February 2016. Jean Lenihan of the Los Angeles Review of Books described Girl Through Glass:

In the end, the well-honed storyline . . . is not unlike a certain kind of stylized psychological ballet, á la Antony Tudor, with heightened characters dancing along dire boundaries. Powerfully stark, both pretty and not, the scene begins with a dissolving family, the father exiting right, the mother left, leaving room for a mysterious caped man to lure the remaining girl-child into an inhumanly fast pas de deux. Is this Lazarus or Lucifer? A woman enters from upstage, dancing with strength and purpose, here, perhaps, to save the girl. But the man has a double, too."

The book was included in BuzzFeed’s Most Exciting Books of 2016 list, The Millions Most Anticipated 2016 fiction list, and was named The Rumpus Book Club's January book. The book was featured on National Public Radio and in The New York Times, was long-listed for The Center for Fiction's First Fiction Prize, was a The Millions best-seller, and was an Amazon Book of the Month.

== Personal life ==
Wilson lives in Brooklyn with her husband, cartoonist Josh Neufeld, and their daughter.

== Awards, fellowships, and residencies ==
- 1997 Wallace Stegner Fellowship in Creative Writing
- 1999 Fine Arts Work Center residency
- 2006 Byrdcliffe Colony residency
- 2006 Rockefeller Brothers Fund residency
- 2011 Yaddo residency
- 2018 Ragdale Foundation residency
- 2019 Bethany Arts Community residency
- 2022 Ragdale Foundation residency

== Bibliography ==
- Girl Through Glass: A Novel (Harper, 2016) ISBN 9780062326270
- (editor) Flashed: Sudden Stories in Comics and Prose (Pressgang, 2016) ISBN 978-0990636427
