= Best of Enemies (2015 film) =

- Theatrical release poster
- Directed by: Robert Gordon; Morgan Neville
- Written by: Robert Gordon; Morgan Neville
- Produced by: Julie Goldman; Clif Phillips; Caryn Capotosto
- Cinematography: David Leonard; Mark Schwartzbard; Graham Willoughby
- Edited by: Eileen Meyer; Aaron Wickenden
- Music by: Jonathan Kirkscey
- Production companies: Media Ranch; Tremolo Productions
- Distributed by: Magnolia Pictures; Participant Media
- Release dates: January 23, 2015 (Sundance); July 31, 2015
- Running time: 88 minutes
- Country: United States
- Language: English
- Budget: $750,000
- Box office: $904,119

Best of Enemies is a 2015 American documentary film co-directed by Robert Gordon and Morgan Neville about the televised debates between William F. Buckley Jr. and intellectual Gore Vidal during the 1968 United States presidential election. The film premiered at the 2015 Sundance Film Festival. It was acquired by Magnolia and Participant Media.

The film took five years to make because of struggles to secure funding, get interviews, and uncover archival footage.

== Content ==
The film examines the ten televised debates between Buckley and Vidal in August 1968 that were moderated by anchorman Howard K. Smith during ABC News coverage of the Republican National Convention in Miami Beach and the Democratic National Convention in Chicago. It especially focuses on a specific incident of on-air insults exchanged by Vidal and Buckley during the Democratic convention, and follows their subsequent thoughts and actions, including articles each wrote for Esquire magazine and the years-long litigation that resulted. It also expands on the impact of these debates on the beginning of modern American punditry.

== Narrative cast ==
- John Lithgow (off-camera voice for Vidal)
- Kelsey Grammer (off-camera voice for Buckley)
- Sam Tanenhaus, Buckley's authorized biographer
- Dick Cavett
- Christopher Hitchens (Hitchens died in December 2011, four years prior to the film's release.)
- Brooke Gladstone
- Ginia Bellafante
- James Wolcott

== Reception ==
On December 1, 2015, the film was selected as one of 15 shortlisted for the Academy Award for Best Documentary Feature.

It premiered on PBS television series Independent Lens on October 3, 2016, during the run-up to the 2016 United States presidential election.

=== Box office ===
The film debuted in three theatrical screens on July 31, 2015, as well as video-on-demand. It grossed $50,378 for a 37th-place finish. The second week saw an increase to 19 screens, resulting in a weekend gross of $81,587. Its highest weekend gross came in week three, where it had an expansion to 47 screens, resulting in a weekend gross of $120,986. The maximum number of screens was 69, in its fifth week, but the film went downhill in gross. The film had a 15-week theatrical run before closing on November 12, 2015, with a total of $892,802. The film had a one-week theatrical run in the United Kingdom the week before the film's US release, grossing $11,317 from 6 screens. As of 22 August 2018, the film has a worldwide total of $904,119.

=== Critical response ===
Best of Enemies received very positive reviews from critics. Review aggregator website Rotten Tomatoes gives the film a 93% rating based on 118 reviews, with an average rating of 7.61/10. The website's critical consensus states: "Smart, fascinating, and funny, Best of Enemies takes a penetrating—and wildly entertaining—look back at the dawn of pundit politics." On Metacritic, the film has a 77 out of 100 rating based on 21 critics, indicating "generally positive reviews". A Vulture article entitled "18 Best Films From Sundance 2015" said of the film, "This might have been both the most entertaining and the saddest film of this year’s Sundance: a riveting gabfest that slowly becomes a lament for the Republic". Gordon and Neville appeared on the C-SPAN program Q&A on July 26, 2015, with host Brian Lamb to discuss the film.

=== Stage adaptation ===
In 2021, a play inspired by the film premiered at the Young Vic, written by James Graham.

== Soundtrack ==
The film was scored by cellist Jonathan Kirkscey. The music used in the film's opening sequence is "Portofino" by Raymond Scott.
