= Can't Buy Me Like =

2013 book by Bob Garfield and Doug Levy

- First edition
- Author: Bob Garfield, Doug Levy
- Publisher: Portfolio
- Publication date: 2013
- ISBN: 978-1591845775

Can't Buy Me Like is a 2013 book by Bob Garfield and Doug Levy (ISBN 978-1591845775). Can't Buy Me Like focuses on demonstrating to marketers how to build meaningful business returns in the Relationship Era by cultivating authentic customer relationships. The book was published in March 2013 by the Penguin Group.

The book proposes an ongoing shift in marketing from the Consumer Era, where marketers spin product advertising, to the Relationship Era, where companies who have a core purpose and care about something other than selling products sell more of their products. It indicates that the success of companies in the Relationship Era is based on authenticity, trust, and relationships.

== Synopsis ==
Can't Buy Me Like: How Authentic Customer Connections Drive Superior Results" is a 2013 book by Bob Garfield and Doug Levy that argues for a shift in marketing and advertising towards what the authors call the "Relationship Era." In this era, companies are encouraged to focus on building authentic, purpose-driven relationships with their customers, rather than relying solely on traditional advertising methods.

The book is organized into an introduction, 11 chapters, and an afterword, and is presented in a narrative format. It includes case studies from both large and small businesses, supported by public and proprietary data. Additionally, the book provides practical tools such as graphics, charts, and step-by-step guidelines aimed at helping businesses succeed in the Relationship Era. Central to the book’s thesis is the idea that companies must have a clear and genuine purpose in their branding to thrive in this new marketing paradigm.

In the introduction, the authors state: "At the most basic level, Can't Buy Me Like is a book about a simple truth: if you are still selling goods and services by blanketing the world with advertising, trying to persuade or entertain or flatter consumers into submission, you are doing things all wrong. Because the world has changed. A lot."

== Release and reception ==
Can't Buy Me Like was well received in the business and marketing fields. It was profiled in The Street, CBC TV, HispanicMPR Podcast, and Forbes.

Jack Covert of 800CEORead praised Can't Buy Me Like for its refreshing and clear roadmap to success in the Relationship Era.

"The book is full of stories about companies that soared in the Consumer Era and are struggling in the Relationship Era and of companies now thriving in the Relationship Era. In many cases, these examples are of such ubiquitous brands that we can't help but see the immediate wisdom in the appraisal of the situation. Garfield and Levy bring their decades of experience in advertising and brand analysis to (literally) lay out a map that companies can use to move toward more sustainable and profitable relationships with their customers."

Can't Buy Me Like and its authors, Garfield and Levy, have also been featured on radio shows such as KERA and NPR, the American Marketing Association podcast, and articles in PBS, MediaPost, Slate.com, Destination CRM, and The Motley Fool, among others.

== See also ==
- Social marketing
