= Ketzel Levine =

American journalist

Ketzel Levine is an American radio journalist who began her broadcast career in 1974. She joined National Public Radio (NPR) in 1977 and worked, variously, as the network's arts producer, sports director, features reporter and garden expert. From 2000 through 2008, she was senior correspondent for the NPR program Morning Edition. At the end of that year, due to cutbacks at the network, Levine was laid off, while working on a documentary series about Americans coping with economic stress and job loss. Her final NPR broadcast was about how she, herself, had just lost her job.

== Broadcast career ==
Levine's academic background was in music and communications. Her first job in broadcasting was at the full-time, non-commercial classical music station WMHT-FM in Schenectady, NY. She moved to Washington, D.C., in 1977 to work at NPR, where she produced the arts magazine, Voices in the Wind. In 1979, she became part of the original staff of Morning Edition, where she remained until moving to London to report for the BBC World Service. While abroad, she also freelanced for NPR, CNN and the BBC domestic service. She returned to NPR full-time as its arts reporter in 1986. In 1990, she took up studies in horticulture, began her own landscape and design business, and in 1992 became NPR's horticultural reporter, the "Doyenne of Dirt", broadcasting for the next ten years on NPR's Weekend Edition with Scott Simon. During this time she was also a contributing writer for Horticulture Magazine, a features writer for Martha Stewart Living and a contributing writer for The Oregonian. In 2000, she published 'Plant This!' (Sasquatch Books, 2000).

In 2000, Levine became a senior correspondent for Morning Edition. In 2007, she expanded her horticultural reporting with the year-long special program, "Climate Connections". She also produced and reported for the series, "Take Two: People Reinventing Themselves Through Their Work", and at the time of her dismissal, was producing and writing a series documenting the effects of the economic crisis, "American Moxie: How We Get By".

Levine's career with NPR ended on an ironic note when she was one of 64 people laid off in December 2008, as she was producing the "American Moxie" series. In her last series installment, she reported about her own layoff.

== Horticultural career ==
Levine studied at the George Washington U School of Landscape Design. She began her own business, Hortus Landscaping, in 1991, then later began a career writing about horticulture, botanizing, and lecturing for garden clubs, botanic gardens and arboretums. After moving to Portland, OR in 1996, she became the northwest regional correspondent for Horticulture Magazine and a contributing editor for The Oregonian. Her newspaper plant profiles were published in the book, Plant This! (Sasquatch Books, 2000). Levine's own garden has been featured in several magazines, including Portland Monthly. A profile of Levine and her garden was published in the February 2011 issue of Sunset Magazine.

== Animal rescue ==
Following her layoff from NPR, Levine pursued a lifelong interest in animal welfare. She began writing for the Humane Society of the United States and working for the Portland office of In Defense of Animals (IDA). In September 2010, she became the volunteer creative and communications director for The Animal Rescue Association of the Americas, the first professional association for animal rescue groups. As of November 2015 she was in Ecuador pursuing local animal rescue efforts.

== Personal life ==
Levine lives in Portland, Oregon. She was raised in Conservative Judaism, but in a 2008 article, stated she considered herself a non-observant Jew. Brooke Gladstone is a cousin.
