= Influencing Machine (book) =

Nonfiction graphic novel by Brooke Gladstone and Josh Neufeld

The Influencing Machine: Brooke Gladstone on the Media
- The cover to the hardcover edition of The Influencing Machine.
- Author: Brooke Gladstone
- Illustrator: Josh Neufeld
- Language: English
- Subject: Media
- Genre: Comics, Journalism, Media Studies, Communication
- Publisher: W. W. Norton
- Publication date: May 2011
- Publication place: United States
- Media type: hardcover, paperback
- Pages: 192
- ISBN: 978-0393077797
- OCLC: 668194783

The Influencing Machine: Brooke Gladstone on the Media is a nonfiction graphic novel by journalist Brooke Gladstone and cartoonist Josh Neufeld. Gladstone describes the book as "a treatise on the relationship between us and the news media." It was further described by the New York Observer as "a manifesto on the role of the press in American history as told through a cartoon version of herself." The title of the book refers to On the Origin of the "Influencing Machine" in Schizophrenia, a 1919 article written by psychoanalyst Viktor Tausk.

== Publication history ==
The Influencing Machine was released in hardcover in May 2011. A paperback edition with a new cover was released in May 2012.

In 2021, a tenth anniversary edition was published, with a new cover, interior revisions, and a new afterword that reckons with the decade since 2011, when social media's growing power complicated Gladstone’s original optimism that “we get the media we deserve."

== Synopsis ==
Much in the vein of Scott McCloud's Understanding Comics, Gladstone appears in the book as an illustrated character, taking the reader through two millennia of history — from the newspapers in Caesar's Rome to the penny press of the American Revolution and the activities of contemporary journalism. Issues discussed include bias, objectivity, misinformation, ethics, and a large chapter on war reporting. In a reference to the Trausk's "Influencing Machine," the book debunks the notion that “The Media” is an external force, outside of our control. Instead, it posits that the media is a mirror — sometimes a distorted one — reflecting society's beliefs and morals back at itself.

== Reception ==
The Influencing Machine received recognition from magazines, newspapers, and websites such as The New Yorker, National Public Radio, the Associated Press, The Nation, Columbia Journalism Review, and many others.

The book was named one of the best comics/graphic novels of 2011 by Publishers Weekly and the Library Journal. It was listed on a number of 2011 holiday gift guides, including New York magazine and BoingBoing. It was selected for 1book140, The Atlantic.com's reading club.

The Influencing Machine has been selected as a common read by a number of universities, including Alaska Pacific University, American University, Millersville University, the University of Alaska Anchorage, and the University of Maryland.

== Editions ==
- Hardcover: The Influencing Machine: Brooke Gladstone on the Media, ISBN 978-0393077797, W.W. Norton, May 2011
- Paperback: ISBN 978-0393342468, W.W. Norton, May 2012
- 10th anniversary paperback: ISBN 978-0-393-54157-1, W.W. Norton, January 2021

The book has been translated and published in four foreign-languages:

- Korean: 미디어 씹어먹기 - 꼼꼼한 언론의 역사, 예리한 미디어 비평 (Devouring the Media: A Meticulous History of the Press, Incisive Media Criticism), DoddleSaeghim, 2012
- Italian: Armi di Persuasione di Massa: Abbiamo i media che ci meritiamo, ISBN 978-8817058704, Rizzoli Lizard, February 2013
- French: La Machine à Influencer: Une historie des medias, ISBN 978-2-916207-96-4, Çà et Là, April 2014
- German: Der Beeinflussungsapparat, ISBN 9783981740004, Correctiv, April 2016

== See also ==
- On the Media
