= Earth 2100 =

2009 television film directed by Rudy Bednar

- Title card
- Genre: Social problem film
- Written by: Josh Neufeld; Abigail Thomas
- Directed by: Rudy Bednar
- Starring: Bob Woodruff; Jared Diamond; Thomas Homer-Dixon; Peter Gleick; Thomas Friedman; Alex Steffen
- Country of origin: United States
- Original language: English

Production
- Producers: Michael Bicks; Linda Hirsch; Ralph Avellino
- Editors: Ralph Avelino; Geoff Gruetzmacher; Bria Lough
- Running time: 85 minutes

Original release
- Network: ABC
- Release: June 2, 2009

Earth 2100 is a television program and a science fiction documentary film that was presented by ABC on June 2, 2009, aired on the History Channel in January 2010, and was shown throughout the year. The two-hour special, which Bob Woodruff hosted, looked at what "a worst-case" future might entail if people do nothing about current or impending issues that could endanger civilization. The problems addressed in the program include current climate change, overpopulation, and misuse of energy resources.

The events following the life of a fictitious storyteller, "Lucy" (told through the use of motion comics, or limited animation), as she describes how the events affect her life. The program included predictions of a dystopian Earth in the years 2015, 2030, 2050, 2085, and 2100 by scientists, historians, social anthropologists, and economists, including Jared Diamond, Thomas Homer-Dixon, Peter Gleick, James Howard Kunstler, Heidi Cullen, Alex Steffen and Joseph Tainter. It ended with a quote from writer Alex Steffen, saying:

Kids born today will see us navigate past the first greatest test of humanity, which is: can we actually be smart enough to live on a planet without destroying it?

According to executive producer Michael Bicks, "this program was developed to show the worst-case scenario for human civilization. Again, we are not saying that these events will happen — rather, that if we fail to seriously address the complex problems of climate change, resource depletion and overpopulation, they are much more likely to happen."

== Plot ==
Lucy is born on June 2, 2009 (the date the program aired; changed to January 1, 2009, in subsequent airings), in the suburbs of Miami, and is still alive in the year 2100. In 2015, negotiations on climate change action breaks down between the West and India/China as the former is unwilling to transfer clean technology to the latter, while Lucy's family moves out of the suburbs and into an apartment in Miami after chronic gas shortages. A few months later a powerful hurricane named Linda hits and levels much of Miami, killing thousands of people. She and her parents move to San Diego. She becomes an EMT and meets her husband, Josh, an engineer, during a protest against high water prices of California desalinated seawater in 2030 (Las Vegas had run dry).

In 2050, they and their nineteen-year-old daughter Molly move to New York City by car, passing desperate Texans begging for rides north, which is refused by the trio. One pulls a gun on Molly, but others in the car/truck convoy point automatic weapons on the desperate man, who is forced to back off. While the others in the convoy make it to Canada, New York City is a marvel of clean power, clean transit, and community gardening. Josh sets to work building a flood barrier to hold back the ocean, but the CO_{2} warming unleashes trapped methane in the Arctic, which causes even faster, non-linear warming.

An attempt to use sulfur dioxide as a last resort to cool the planet is called off when it is found to destroy the ozone layer. Lucy finds and helps quarantine and neutralize a strange new disease, and Molly moves upstate to an agricultural community. During a storm at high tide in 2075, Josh is killed while trying to fix a stuck gate, and New York City is flooded. Lucy refuses Molly's offer to live with her, her husband, and son. Starving people among the rotting flood damage set the stage for the return of the disease Lucy saw, now called "Caspian Fever."

Caspian Fever soon becomes a pandemic and kills so many people on Earth that the human population starts shrinking, international trade stops and basic services begin to break down. Eventually, the grid fails, modern technology stops working, and unrest follows (a plot contradiction as it was stated earlier that all technology in New York was self-sustaining), it dawns on Lucy and every American that there is no Federal response, no National Guard, no soldiers to keep order. Democracy and civilization at the national level have died in America.

Lucy leaves the city with some friends and a dog in the 2080s, and eventually finds her daughter, now a widow like herself, and her grandson. Initially, there is no communication with the outside world, until someone set up a two-way radio discovering former cities have become relatively advanced walled enclaves, while surrounded by masses of poverty. In 2100, Lucy ponders what strange advice to pass along to her grandson, now denied the education she took for granted, as she is the oldest person in the world.

== Development ==
According to early ABC press releases, Earth 2100 was meant to be an "unprecedented television and Internet event." The initial phase of the project was an online "crowdsourcing" project where viewers were encouraged to submit homemade videos imagining life in 2015, 2050, and 2100 in locations in Africa, Australia, United States, Europe, India, South America, and China. During the summer and fall of 2008, users began to post their submissions on the Earth 2100 website, and these videos were cobbled together into a Web-based narrative showing the worldwide consequences of population growth, resource depletion, and climate change.

Multiple delays changed the scope of the project. Originally, Earth 2100 was set to air in September 2008. Then, partly for personal reasons on the part of producer Michael Bicks, the program was rescheduled for Spring 2009. The final product was innovative in its use of the "motion comics" element and the "Lucy" story, but used very little user-generated footage.

The Earth 2100 website, however, does feature selections of user-created videos representing the crisis points of 2015, 2050, and 2100.

=== Motion comic ===
Lucy's story was created with a limited animation technique using the talents of comic book creators, including Josh Neufeld, Sari Wilson, Joe Infurnari, George O'Connor, Tim Hamilton, and Leland Purvis. Their story was brought to "life" by the visual effects company Guerilla FX and lead animator John Bair.

== Reception ==
The Earth 2100 premiere garnered an audience of nearly 3.7 million viewers, according to Nielsen Media Research.

Response to the broadcast was mostly confined to online comment boards, which soon buzzed with debates about the validity of Earth 2100's predictions, and the show's overall effectiveness. Many commenters were annoyed by the show's apocalyptic, dystopian tone, accusing ABC of far-fetched fear-mongering. Thomas Fuller, writing for Examiner.com, accused ABC of portraying "science fiction" as fact, and stating that:

. . . when people realize (as they are realizing now) that temperatures are not going to climb every year, they are not going to remember what sober scientists say. They are going to think of Earth 2100 and other scare stories about catastrophe, and realize that they were lies. They will then completely tune out science and it will be impossible to even do the sensible things we can and should do.

ABC made sure to post annotated transcripts on the Earth 2100 website, outlining the scientific sources for the program's various predictions, scenarios, and statements.

Some commenters found the Lucy/motion comic storyline a very effective way of depicting the various predictions. Posts also congratulated ABC for devoting a two-hour, prime-time spot to the issue, and asked when the program would be re-aired, made available on DVD, or posted online.

== See also ==
- Ecological economics
- Global warming
- Malthusian catastrophe
- Peak oil, Peak gas, Peak uranium
- Planetary boundaries
- Societal collapse
- Survivalism
- Water crisis
