= Brooke Gladstone =

American journalist, author and media analyst

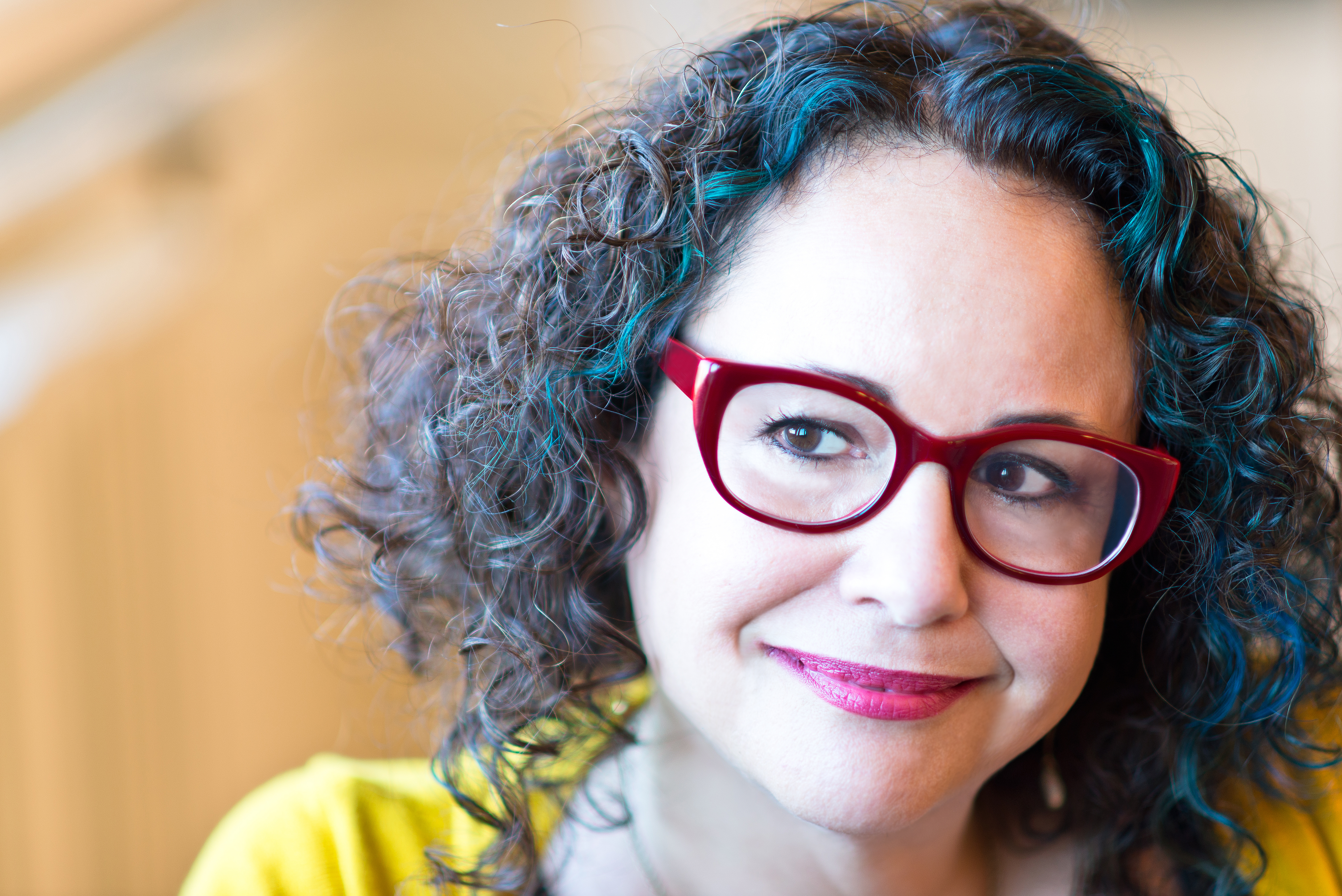
- Gladstone in 2014
- Born: 1955 (age 70–71); Long Island, New York, US
- Education: University of Vermont (BA)
- Occupations: Journalist, author, media analyst
- Notable credit(s): On the Media; All Things Considered; Weekend Edition; The Influencing Machine
- Spouse: Fred Kaplan (m. 1983)
- Children: 2

Brooke Gladstone (born 1955) is an American journalist, author, and media analyst. She is the host and managing editor of the WNYC radio program On the Media.

== Early life and education ==
Gladstone was born on Long Island, New York, one of six siblings. She grew up in Syosset, and attended Syosset High School. Shortly before college, she moved with her family to the Northeast Kingdom area of Vermont, and ended up attending the University of Vermont, majoring in theatre and graduating in 1978.

== Career ==
Gladstone has covered media for much of her career. In the early 1980s, she covered public broadcasting for the industry newspaper Current and reported for Cablevision and The Washington Weekly in Washington, D.C.

In 1987, Gladstone joined National Public Radio, first as editor of Weekend Edition with Scott Simon, and later became senior editor of All Things Considered. In 1991, she received a Knight Fellowship to study Russian language and history. A year later, she was reporting from Moscow for NPR, covering stories such as the bloody 1993 Russian constitutional crisis. In 1995, Gladstone returned to the United States and was hired as NPR's first "media reporter", based in New York City.

In October 2000, Gladstone joined WNYC—New York Public Radio—to help relaunch On the Media, a locally produced and nationally distributed radio show. By 2010, it had quadrupled its audience and earned several major journalism awards.

Gladstone wrote The Influencing Machine, a nonfiction graphic novel illustrated by Josh Neufeld and others in 2011. Gladstone describes the book as "a treatise on the relationship between us and the news media," further described by Leon Neyfakh as "a manifesto on the role of the press in American history as told through a cartoon version of herself." The Influencing Machine was listed seventh among the ten Masterpieces of Graphic Nonfiction by The Atlantic, and listed among the top books of 2011 by The New Yorker, Library Journal, Kirkus Reviews, and Publishers Weekly. Academic journals called her book an illustration of the history of media's influence on culture.

In 2015, Gladstone was part of the cast of the historical documentary Best of Enemies, directed by Robert Gordon and Morgan Neville.

In 2017, Gladstone wrote The Trouble With Reality: A Rumination on Moral Panic in Our Time, a nonfiction book in which she talks about how people's filtered reality in a constantly changing media landscape threatens democracy, published by Workman Publishing Company.

In 2019, Gladstone joined NPR Detroit to host a one-month-long series on the house-evictions crisis on Detroit today with Stephen Henderson. In 2022, she was a Critic in Residence at the American Academy in Rome.

Gladstone gives lectures as a guest at universities including Princeton and the University of Texas at Austin.

== Personal life ==
Gladstone is married to Fred Kaplan, a journalist and author. Together, they have twin daughters. Gladstone is Jewish and lives in Brooklyn, New York. Ketzel Levine is a cousin.

== Honors and awards ==
- 1991 John S. Knight Fellowships for Professional Journalists (Stanford University)
- Overseas Press Club Award
- 2003 Milwaukee Press Club Sacred Cat Award
- 2004 Peabody Award
- 2012 Honorary Doctorate from The New School
- 2020 Front Page Award for Radio In-Depth Reporting for the series "Busted: America's Poverty Myths"

== Works ==
- Brooke Gladstone (w), Josh Neufeld (a). The Influencing Machine: Brooke Gladstone on the Media (2011). W. W. Norton & Company. ISBN 9780393077797
- — (2017). The Trouble with Reality: A Rumination on Moral Panic in Our Time. Workman Publishing Company. ISBN 9781523502387.
