= Josh Neufeld =

American cartoonist (born 1967)

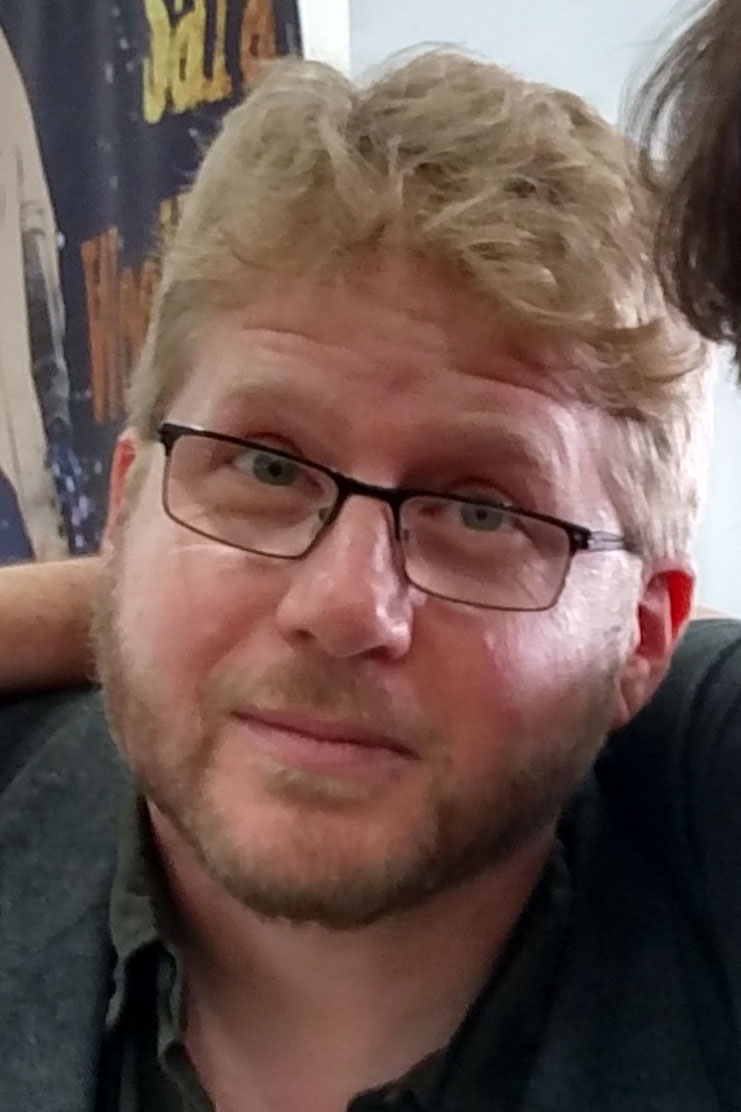
- Josh Neufeld, photographed at a comics festival, in 2015.
- Born: Joshua Michael Rosler Neufeld; August 9, 1967 (age 59) New York City, U.S.
- Areas: Cartoonist, Artist
- Notable works: A.D.: New Orleans After the Deluge; The Influencing Machine; A Few Perfect Hours; American Splendor
- Collaborators: Harvey Pekar; Brooke Gladstone; Rob Walker; David Greenberger
- Awards: Graphic Medicine Award, 2023; Knight-Wallace Fellowship, 2012–2013; Xeric Award, 2004

Josh Neufeld (born August 9, 1967) is an alternative cartoonist known for his comics journalism work on subjects like graphic medicine, equity, and technology; as well as his collaborations with writers like Harvey Pekar and Brooke Gladstone. He is the writer/artist of A.D.: New Orleans After the Deluge, and the illustrator of The Influencing Machine: Brooke Gladstone on the Media.

== Biography and career highlights ==
Born in New York to parents Leonard Neufeld and artist Martha Rosler, Neufeld spent most of his youth in California (San Diego and San Francisco), and then moved back to New York City during his teenage years. He graduated from the Fiorello H. LaGuardia High School in 1985 and Oberlin College with a B.A. in Art History in 1989. Shortly after graduating from college, he spent over a year backpacking with his then-girlfriend (now his wife) through Southeast Asia and Central Europe, and living for a period in the Czech Republic.

As a child, Neufeld's influences were Belgian cartoonist Hergé's The Adventures of Tintin, Goscinny & Uderzo's Asterix, and the Curt Swan-Murphy Anderson issues of Action Comics and Superman. Later in life, as he gravitated toward alternative comics, Neufeld was inspired by the writing and work of Scott McCloud, Chris Ware, and Dan Clowes; and the real-life stories of Joe Sacco, Harvey Pekar, and David Greenberger.

In 2010, Neufeld was invited to act as a representative of the United States Department of State's Speaker and Specialist program, which sends Americans abroad as cultural "ambassadors." In March 2010, Neufeld spent two weeks in Burma as part of the program; in October he visited Egypt, Algeria, Bahrain, and Israel/Palestine as part of the same program.

Neufeld was a 2012–2013 Knight-Wallace Fellow in journalism at the University of Michigan; he was the first so-called "comics journalist" to be awarded a Knight-Wallace Fellowship.

In October 2014, Neufeld was a Master Artist at the Atlantic Center for the Arts, where he led a three-week residency for mid-career cartoonists.

Neufeld is also a comics educator. He is on the faculty of the School of Visual Arts, as well as the faculty of Michigan State University. He is the lead faculty mentor for the Comics & Graphic Narratives concentration at the Solstice Low-Residency MFA Program of Lasell University. He was a visiting professor at CUNY Queens College in the spring of 2017, and returned in the same role in spring 2020.

Neufeld currently resides with his wife, the writer Sari Wilson, and their daughter, in Brooklyn, New York.

== Works ==
=== Creator-owned titles ===
Neufeld was awarded a 2004 grant from the Xeric Foundation for his graphic novel, A Few Perfect Hours (and Other Stories From Southeast Asia & Central Europe), a collection of real-life stories about his travel experiences. He is the creator of the comic book series The Vagabonds (published by Alternative Comics), and co-creator (with high school friend Dean Haspiel) of Keyhole (Millennium/Modern and Top Shelf Productions) and (with R. Walker) Titans of Finance: True Tales of Money and Business (Alternative Comics).

=== A.D.: New Orleans After the Deluge ===
In 2005, shortly after Hurricane Katrina struck the Gulf Coast, Neufeld spent three weeks as an American Red Cross volunteer in Biloxi, Mississippi. The blog he kept about that experience turned into a self-published book, Katrina Came Calling (2006). Later, Neufeld was asked to write the introduction to a book called Signs of Life: Surviving Katrina, a collection of photos of the hand-made signs that appeared in New Orleans and along the Gulf Coast following Hurricane Katrina. Profits from sales of the book went two organizations still working in the area: Common Ground Relief and Hands On Network.

In 2007–2008, Neufeld wrote and drew A.D.: New Orleans After the Deluge, an online graphic novel serialized on SMITH Magazine. A.D. tells the real stories of seven New Orleans residents and their experiences during and after Hurricane Katrina. A.D. received extensive press coverage, including in such venues as the Los Angeles Times, the New Orleans Times-Picayune, the Atlanta Journal-Constitution, Rolling Stone, Wired.com, BoingBoing, the Toronto Star, and National Public Radio's "News & Notes". Through this work, and his later collaboration, The Influencing Machine, Neufeld leads an intense reflection about the way the media treats information.

In May 2008, it was announced that a four-color hardcover edition of A.D. would be published by Pantheon Graphic Novels. The book included 25% more story and art, as well as extensive revisions to the material from the webcomic. Debuting on August 18, 2009, shortly before Hurricane Katrina's fourth anniversary, A.D. went on to become a New York Times bestseller. In 2026, the A.D. archives were acquired by the Library of Congress.

=== Other publications ===
His comics have also been published in The Boston Globe, the Chicago Sun-Times, Columbia Journalism Review, World War 3 Illustrated, FSB, The Village Voice, The Chicago Reader, In These Times, and many other venues. Neufeld's illustrations have appeared in The New York Times, the Wall Street Journal, Forbes, Nickelodeon Magazine, the Austin American-Statesman, the Washington City Paper, New York Press, and many other publications.

Neufeld was one of the founding members of the online comics collective ACT-I-VATE. In 2014 he joined the comics collective Hang Dai Editions (of whose founding members was his long-time friend Dean Haspiel).

Neufeld co-wrote the "motion comics" element of the ABC News documentary Earth 2100, which premiered on ABC on June 2, 2009. Neufeld worked on the sections of the documentary dealing with the fictional character "Lucy," who witnesses the apocalyptic effects of climate change and societal upheaval during the course of the 21st century.

His comics were introduced in France through Angoulême's International Comic Festival in 2012 and 2015.

== Collaboration ==
Neufeld was a long-time artist for Pekar’s American Splendor, and has collaborated with many writers from outside the comics world, including poets, memoirists, and theatre groups. Other comics writers Neufeld has illustrated stories for include Pekar's wife Joyce Brabner (in American Splendor), and Greenberger in Duplex Planet Illustrated (published by Fantagraphics), R. Walker (in Titans of Finance), and Peter Ross (in a self-published mini-comic called Mortgage Your Soul).

Neufeld's collaborations with writers from outside the traditional comics world tend to be formalist and experimental in spirit. He has adapted a number of poet Nick Flynn's pieces into comics, which have appeared in various literary journals and websites. Neufeld is an Associate Artist with the New York-based theatre collective The Civilians, and has adapted portions of a number of their plays into comic book form. He has also collaborated with writer Eileen Myles, and Neufeld's mother, artist Martha Rosler. A special issue (subtitled "Of Two Minds") of Neufeld's comics series The Vagabonds was dedicated to his many collaborations.

Neufeld collaborated with journalist Brooke Gladstone on The Influencing Machine, published by W.W. Norton. Gladstone describes the book as "a treatise on the relationship between us and the news media, ... a manifesto on the role of the press in American history as told through a cartoon version of [me] that would preside over each page." The Influencing Machine was released in hardcover in May 2011. A paperback edition with a new cover was released in May 2012. A tenth anniversary edition, with a new cover, interior revisions, new material, and a new afterword, was released in January 2021.

In 2019–2020, Neufeld and his longtime friend/collaborator Dean Haspiel delved into podcasting, producing Scene by Scene with Josh & Dean, a deep dive into the movie American Splendor and the two artists' relationships with Harvey Pekar.

== Selected bibliography ==
Neufeld's website features a complete bibliography.

=== Graphic novels and creator-owned works ===
- The Vagabonds (issues #1-2 Alternative Comics, 2003–2006; issues #3–6 Hang Dai Productions, 2014-2018)
- (as co-editor with Sari Wilson) Flashed: Sudden Stories in Comics and Prose (Pressgang, 2016) ISBN 978-0990636427
- (with Brooke Gladstone) The Influencing Machine (W. W. Norton & Company, 2011) ISBN 978-0393077797
- A.D.: New Orleans After the Deluge (SMITH Magazine 2007–2008; Pantheon, 2009) ISBN 978-0-307-37814-9
- A Few Perfect Hours (and Other Stories From Southeast Asia & Central Europe) (self-published through a grant from the Xeric Foundation, 2004) ISBN 978-1-891867-79-8
- (with writer R. Walker) Titans of Finance (Alternative Comics, 2001) ISBN 978-1-891867-05-7
- (with Dean Haspiel) Keyhole (issues #1-4 Millennium/Modern, 1996–1997; issues #5–6 Top Shelf Productions, 1998; issue #7 ("Keyhole 25") Hang Dai Productions, 2021)

=== Comics journalism stories ===
- "Before the Doctor Sees It: Test Results in the Era of Instant Access," co-published by The Journalist's Resource and The Boston Globe (May 2026)
- "Recovery, and Finding the Next Frame," Chamber Music magazine (Fall 2025)
- "Answering Francis' Call: Every Campus A Refuge," The Boston Globe Opinion (May 24, 2025)
- "Closing the Gap: How a Church-Hospital Partnership on Chicago's West Side is Aiming to Reduce Hypertension," co-published by The Journalist's Resource and the Chicago Sun-Times (Jan. 10, 2025)
- "Empathy 101: How Medical Schools are Using Improv Theater, Virtual Reality, and Comics to Help Physicians Understand Their Patients," The Journalist's Resource (Dec. 21, 2023); reprinted in the Chicago Sun-Times Sunday edition
- "Kansas City and the Case for Restitutional Medicine," Harvard Public Health magazine (Fall 2022)
- “Vaccinated at the Ball: A True Story About Trusted Messengers,” The Journalist's Resource (June 13, 2022); reprinted in the Chicago Sun-Times Sunday edition
- “Clean Slate: A Student-Debt Forgiveness Story,” The Emancipator (Apr. 24, 2022)
- “A Tale of Two Pandemics: A Nonfiction Comic About Persistent Racial Disparities,” The Journalist’s Resource (Nov. 16, 2020)
- “Supply Chain Superhero,” PANDEMIX: Quarantine Comics in the Age of ‘Rona (July 2020)
- "A Brief Introduction to Differential Privacy: A Data Protection Plan for the 2020 Census,” The Journalist's Resource (Mar. 23, 2020)
- "A Graphic Guide to the 2020 US Census," The Journalist's Resource (Dec. 2, 2019)
- "Still Life: Thinking Outside the Casket," The Nib (Nov. 8, 2018)
- "The Trump-Russia memos: a graphic account of the so-called ‘dossier’ that had the media world buzzing," Columbia Journalism Review (Fall 2017)
- "Why We Break Our Stuff Accidentally-on-Purpose," Harvard Business School Working Knowledge (March 29, 2017)
- "Costumed Chaos in Times Square: The infamous street Elmos of NYC fight for their right to take selfies with tourists," The Nib (Sept. 26, 2016)
- "The Secret Life of Emojis," The Boston Globe (March 11, 2016)
- (with Adam Bessie) "A Scanner Constantly,” Pacific Standard (Feb. 8, 2016)
- (with Alia Malek and Peter van Agtmael) "The Road to Germany: $2400," Foreign Policy (Jan./Feb. 2016)
- (co-written with Michael Keller) "Fare Game: Taking the Rating Economy for a Ride," Al Jazeera America (Dec. 19, 2015)
- "Where are they now? Revisiting 4 Katrina survivors 10 years later," Fusion (Aug. 28, 2015)
- (with Adam Bessie) "Notification: You’ve Got Cancer," The Boston Globe (July 2, 2015)
- (with Martha Rosler) "Gift to the World,” The Art of Saving a Life (Bill & Melinda Gates Foundation, Feb. 2015)
- "Crossing the Line: Racial Profiling at the U.S. Border," Medium/The Nib (Jan. 5, 2015)
- (co-written with Michael Keller) "Terms of Service: Understanding Our Role in the World of Big Data," Al Jazeera America (Oct. 30, 2014)
- (with Adam Bessie) "The School is Not a Pipe" Truthout (Feb. 7, 2014)
- "SuperStorm Stories: a Red Hook Family," Medium/The Nib (Oct. 29, 2013)
- "Türk Cayi,” The Journal of the Knight-Wallace Fellows of the University of Michigan (2013)
- "Adventures in Comics Journalism," Mint's "The Small Picture" (2013)
- "The Bitumen Junket," The Journal of the Knight-Wallace Fellows of the University of Michigan (2012)
- (with Tori Marlan) "Stowaway," Atavist (May 2012)
- "Bahrain: Lines in Ink, Lines in the Sand," Cartoon Movement (Dec. 8, 2011)
- (with Martha Rosler) "Scenes From an Illicit War: From Planet Invisible," System Error: War is a Force That Gives Us Meaning (Silvana Editoriale, 2007)
- (with Harvey Pekar) "Global Warming," American Splendor (vol. 2) #2 (Vertigo, 2008)
- (with R. Walker) "Titans of Finance: Hoodoo," Drawn Bits (2002)
- (with R. Walker) "Titans of Finance: The Comic Book Villain," EXPO 2000 (2000)
- (with Harvey Pekar) "Stupid Capitalists," Green Magazine (Winter 2000)
- (with R. Walker) "Titans of Finance: Look the Part," SPX’99: The Comic (1999)
- (with R. Walker) "Titans of Finance: Ask Jay," Small Press Expo (1997)
- (with Harvey Pekar) "Andy Statman," The Village Voice (1996)

== Awards ==
- 2024:
  - Honorable Mention, Excellence-in-Features journalism awards (general feature, 1,000-2,499 words) (Society for Features Journalism). For "Empathy 101: How Med Schools Are Using Improv, Virtual Reality, and, Yes, Comics, to Help Doctors and Patients Communicate" (The Journalist's Resource/Chicago Sun-Times)
  - First Place, Informational Graphic (Illinois Press Association Awards). For "Empathy 101" (The Journalist's Resource/Chicago Sun-Times)
- 2023:
  - GMIC Award for Excellence in Graphic Medicine, Short Form (Graphic Medicine International Collective). For "Vaccinated at the Ball: A True Story About Trusted Messengers" (The Journalist's Resource/Chicago Sun-Times)
  - Salute to Excellence for Newspaper – Newsroom Staff of 51 – 100: Specialty (National Association of Black Journalists). For "Vaccinated at the Ball" (The Journalist's Resource/Chicago Sun-Times)
  - Honorable Mention, Excellence-in-Features journalism awards (Special Product, Division 2) (Society for Features Journalism). For "Vaccinated at the Ball" (The Journalist's Resource/Chicago Sun-Times)
  - Best of the Press for Informational Graphic: 1st Place, Division F (Illinois Press Association). For "Vaccinated at the Ball" (The Journalist's Resource/Chicago Sun-Times)
- 2018:
  - CASE Circle of Excellence Award — Bronze Medal: Writing for the Web (Council for Advancement and Support of Education). For “The Story of Why Humans Are So Careless with Their Phones” (Harvard Business School Working Knowledge)
  - National First Place Award (American Society of Business Publication Editors). For “The Story of Why Humans Are So Careless with Their Phones” (Harvard Business School Working Knowledge)
- 2015:
  - Economic Hardship Reporting Project Grant (Institute for Policy Studies, Washington, D.C.) For "Where Are They Now?" (Fusion)
  - EPPY Award for Best Innovation Project on a Website (Editor & Publisher). For Terms of Service
- 2014:
  - Master Artist (Atlantic Center for the Arts, New Smyrna Beach, Florida)
  - "Media Education" Special Award (Assises Internationales du Journalisme). For La Machine à Influencer (French edition of The Influencing Machine)
- 2012 Knight-Wallace Fellowship in Journalism at the University of Michigan
- 2004 Xeric Award for A Few Perfect Hours (and Other Stories from Southeast Asia & Central Europe)
- 1996 CAAP (Chicago Arts Assistance Program) Grant, City of Chicago Department of Cultural Affairs

=== Nominations ===
- 2025:
  - GMIC Award for Excellence in Graphic Medicine, Short Form (Graphic Medicine International Collective). For "Closing the Gap" (The Journalist's Resource/Chicago Sun-Times)
  - Sarah Brown Boyden Award for Innovative Storytelling (Chicago Journalists Association). For "Closing the Gap" (The Journalist's Resource/Chicago Sun-Times)
- 2024 GMIC Award for Excellence in Graphic Medicine, Short Form (Graphic Medicine International Collective). For "Empathy 101" (The Journalist's Resource/Chicago Sun-Times)
- 2022 Peter Lisagor Awards for Best Illustration or Graphics (Chicago Headline Club). For "Vaccinated at the Ball: A True Story About Trusted Messengers" (The Journalist's Resource/Chicago Sun-Times)
- 2016 One World Media Press Award (One World Media, London, England, UK). For “The Road to Germany: $2400” (Foreign Policy)
- 2015 Prix France Info de la Bande dessinée d’actualité et de reportage (franceinfo, Paris, France). For La machine à influencer
- 2012 Eisner Award for Best Digital Comic. For "Bahrain: Lines in Ink, Lines in the Sand".
- 2010:
  - Harvey Award for Best Previously Published Graphic Album. For A.D.: New Orleans After the Deluge.
  - Eisner Award for Best Graphic Album-Reprint. For A.D.: New Orleans After the Deluge.
  - Harry Chapin Media Award in the Book category. For A.D.: New Orleans After the Deluge
- 1997 Ignatz Award for Outstanding Comic. For Keyhole #2.
