= Robert Gordon (writer and filmmaker) =

American writer and filmmaker

Robert Gordon is an American writer and filmmaker from Memphis, Tennessee. His work has focused on the American south—its music, art, and politics—to create an insider's portrait of his home, both nuanced and ribald.

== Films ==
Robert Gordon's first film, All Day and All Night: Memories From Beale Street Musicians, was a 30-minute documentary shot on 16mm. Produced by the Center for Southern Folklore, the film featured musicians such as B.B. King, Booker T. Laury, Rufus Thomas, and Evelyn Young. The film showed at MOMA's New Directors/New Films Festival in 1990.

Gordon is also the writer and associate producer of The Road To Memphis, a Richard Pearce film that documented the career of musician B.B. King. The Road To Memphis was featured in Martin Scorsese's 2003 documentary series The Blues.

In 2005, Gordon produced and directed the acclaimed Stranded in Canton, a black-and-white counterculture immersion filmed by photographer William Eggleston in 1975. Stranded in Canton heavily features Memphis rock and roll outlaw Jerry McGill, who recorded at Sun Records for a short period in the late 1950s. Gordon produced the follow-up Very Extremely Dangerous, a 2012 film documenting the turbulent life of McGill. The film saw its regional premiere at Indie Memphis Film Festival, where it won the Special Jury Prize for Documentary Feature.

His more traditional documentaries include Muddy Waters: Can’t Be Satisfied (which aired on PBS’s American Masters) and the PBS Great Performances special, Respect Yourself: The Stax Records Story. Other titles include Johnny Cash’s America (A&E) and Shakespeare Was A Big George Jones Fan, a documentary about Jack Clement. His work has been broadcast on PBS, A&E, and numerous international networks, and has been exhibited nationally and internationally at prominent museums (The Whitney, MOMA, LACMA, SFMOMA, Haus der Kunst).

In 2014, Gordon produced Big Star: Live in Memphis, the only known professionally filmed concert of the Memphis band. The film documented Big Star's performance at the New Daisy Theatre in Memphis on October 29, 1994.

Most recently, Gordon directed and produced Best of Enemies, a behind-the-scenes account of the explosive 1968 televised debates between the liberal Gore Vidal and the conservative William F. Buckley Jr. Co-directed with Morgan Neville, Best of Enemies premiered at Sundance, where it sold to Magnolia Pictures and enjoyed a successful theatrical run. It was shortlisted for the 2016 Academy Awards, won the Int’l Documentary Association’s Best Documentary Award, and is nominated for Best Doc at the Independent Spirit Awards. Remake rights have been purchased by Aaron Sorkin.

== Books ==
Gordon's first book, It Came From Memphis, "is a penetrating, bare knuckles portrait of a strange town in a fertile time, and the impact it had on American music." Gordon's research "careens through the 1950s, '60s, and '70s, riding shotgun with the weirdoes, winos, and midget wrestlers responsible for rock and roll."

In 2003, Gordon wrote the definitive biography of Muddy Waters, the award-winning Can’t Be Satisfied: The Life and Times of Muddy Waters.

In 2005, Gordon and Bruce Nemerov co-edited Lost Delta Found: Rediscovering the Fisk University-Library of Congress Coahoma County Study, 1941-1942. With Lost Delta Found, Publishers Weekly stated that "Gordon and Nemerov have rescued from oblivion an important study of black life in rural Mississippi."

Gordon has also written two books about Elvis Presley in cooperation with the singer's Graceland estate: Elvis: The King on the Road and The Elvis Treasures.

Gordon's latest book, Respect Yourself: Stax Records and the Soul Explosion sets the story of America's premier soul music company against Memphis's history of racism and segregation. The book has gone into four hardback printings and received accolades from the Wall Street Journal, the New York Times, and Rolling Stone. Neil Spencer of the Guardian noted Gordon's ability to "[write] with infectious brio and devotion, drawing on a mass of interviews for what is an engrossing, sometimes salutary narrative."

== Awards and nominations ==
Work	Award	Result
Al Green Anthology (box set)	1997 Grammy Award	Nominated
The Road To Memphis (Martin Scorsese Presents the Blues: A Musical Journey)	2003 Grammy Award	Nominated
Muddy Waters: Can't Be Satisfied	2004 Grammy Award	Nominated
Respect Yourself: The Stax Records Story	2009 Grammy Award	Nominated
Johnny Cash's America	2010 Grammy Award	Nominated
Keep an Eye on the Sky	2011 Grammy Award	Won

== Music videos ==
Gordon has directed a number of music videos for artists including Cat Power, Tav Falco's Panther Burns, Flat Duo Jets, Big Ass Truck, and Mojo Nixon.
