= Fred Kaplan (journalist) =

American author and journalist (born 1954)

Fred M. Kaplan
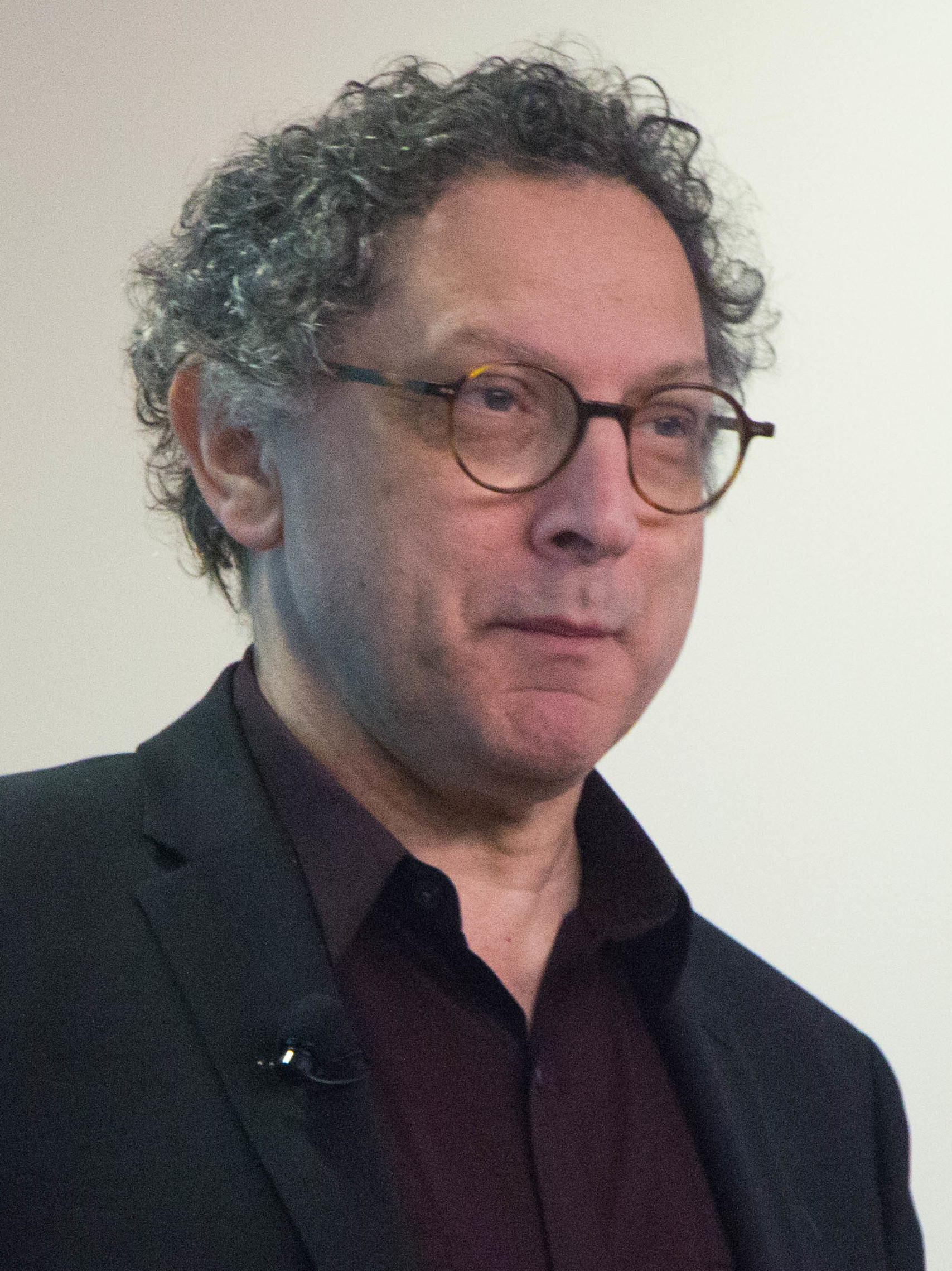
- Kaplan in 2016
- Born: July 4, 1954 (age 72); Hutchinson, Kansas
- Education: Oberlin College; Massachusetts Institute of Technology
- Occupations: Author, journalist
- Spouse: Brooke Gladstone (m. 1983)
- Children: 2

Fred M. Kaplan (born July 4, 1954) is an American author and journalist. His weekly "War Stories" column for Slate magazine covers international relations and U.S. foreign policy.

== Early life and education ==
Kaplan was born in Hutchinson, Kansas, to Jewish parents Julius E. and Ruth (Gottfried) Kaplan.

Kaplan earned a bachelor's degree at Oberlin College in 1976, followed by two degrees from the Massachusetts Institute of Technology: a Master of Science in 1978 and a Ph.D. in political science in 1983.

== Career ==
From 1978 to 1980, Kaplan was a foreign and defense policy adviser to U.S. Congressman Les Aspin (D, Wisconsin).

Before writing for Slate, Kaplan was a correspondent at The Boston Globe, reporting from Washington, D.C., Moscow, and New York City. In 1982, he contributed to "War and Peace in the Nuclear Age," a Sunday Boston Globe Magazine special report on the U.S.–Soviet nuclear arms race that received the Pulitzer Prize for National Reporting in 1983. He has also written for other publications, including The New York Times, The Atlantic, The New Yorker, The New York Review of Books and Scientific American.

Kaplan has authored several books on military strategy. His 1983 book on the individuals who created American nuclear strategy in the late 1940s and '50s, The Wizards of Armageddon, won the Washington Monthly Political Book of the Year award. He published Daydream Believers in 2008, a work which analyzes the George W. Bush administration's use of Cold War tactics in post-9/11 military activities. He criticizes the administration for pursuing policies he believes to be unilateral and violate prohibitions on pre-emptive warfare. In late 2012, Kaplan published The Insurgents: David Petraeus and the Plot to Change the American Way of War, which examines how General David Petraeus attempted to implement new thinking in Afghanistan and Iraq regarding the traditional clear-and-hold counter-insurgency strategy, and the shortcomings of this strategy, its intellectual underpinnings, and the individuals who defined it. The book was a finalist for the Pulitzer Prize for General Nonfiction in 2014.

In 2009, Kaplan published 1959: The Year Everything Changed. The book argues that the course of world history was not changed by the counter-culture movements of the 1960s but rather by artistic, scientific, political and economics events occurring in the year 1959.

== Personal life ==
Kaplan married Brooke Gladstone, a journalist, author and media analyst, in 1983. The couple has twin daughters.

Kaplan is an enthusiast of high-end audio and video equipment, and has reported from the Consumer Electronics Show on new technologies in this area, as well as penning shopping-advice columns on which new televisions offer the best value. He has also authored articles covering jazz and hi-fi equipment for the magazine Stereophile.

== Works ==
Books

- Dubious Specter: A Skeptical Look at the Soviet Nuclear Threat, Institute for Policy Studies, 1980, ISBN 9780897580236
- The Wizards of Armageddon. Simon & Schuster. 1983. ISBN 9780804718844.
- Daydream Believers. John Wiley & Sons. 2008. ISBN 9780470121184.
- 1959: The Year Everything Changed. John Wiley & Sons. 2009. ISBN 9780470730270.
- The Insurgents: David Petraeus and the Plot to Change the American Way of War, Simon and Schuster, 2013, ISBN 9781451642667
- Dark Territory: The Secret History of Cyber War. Simon and Schuster. 2016. ISBN 9781476763279.
- Kaplan, Fred (2020-01-28). The Bomb: Presidents, Generals, and the Secret History of Nuclear War (First Simon & Schuster hardcover ed.). New York. ISBN 978-1-9821-0729-1. OCLC 1105937787.

Select essays

- Kaplan, Fred (January–February 2016). "Obama's Way: The President in Practice". Foreign Affairs. 95 (1). Council on Foreign Relations: 46–63.
- Kaplan, Fred (September–October 2016). "Rethinking Nuclear Policy". Foreign Affairs. 95 (5). Council on Foreign Relations: 18–25.

== Bibliography ==
- Contemporary Authors. Detroit: Gale Research Company, 1998.
