= On the Media =

American public radio show and podcast

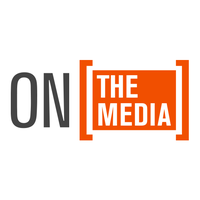
- Other names: OTM
- Genre: News (media analysis)
- Running time: c. 50 minutes
- Country of origin: United States
- Language: English
- Home station: WNYC
- Syndicates: 300 public radio stations via WNYC Studios
- Hosted by: Brooke Gladstone Micah Loewinger
- Produced by: Eloise Blondiau; Molly Rosen; Rebecca Clark-Callender; Candice Wang
- Executive producer: Katya Rogers
- Edited by: Brooke Gladstone
- Recording studio: New York City
- Original release: 1993 – present
- Audio format: Stereophonic
- Opening theme: Ben Allison, composer
- Website: www.onthemedia.org
- Podcast: Podcast

On the Media (OTM) is a public radio show and podcast from WNYC Studios that primarily covers the media. Since relaunching in 2001 with Brooke Gladstone as host, the show has received at least 10 awards, including two Peabody Awards.

== Format ==
OTM explores how the news and other media influence the public's world view. Many stories center on events of the previous week and critique how they were covered in the news. These segments often consist of interviews with reporters about the challenges they face in covering controversial issues, as well as media scholars and analysts.

OTM has covered topics such as the use of video news releases, net neutrality, digital broadcast flags, media consolidation, censorship, freedom of the press, disinformation, the influence of 24-hour cable news television coverage, media bias, and how technology is changing the media.

The show addresses questions about how the media are influenced or spun by politicians, corporations and interest groups with the intent to shape public opinion. This includes an OTM feature that covers the media's use of terminology that may engender biased points of view, such as the use of hot-button issues and code words such as "Michael Moore," "torture," "evangelical" and "islamofascist".

In the wake of the election of Donald Trump to the U.S. presidency, OTM shifted its editorial focus somewhat to give more time to reporting under-covered stories. Since then, OTM has produced a 2016 series on poverty, a 2019 series on eviction, a 2022–25 series on right-wing talk radio, shortwave broadcasting in the United States and Stuart Epperson, as well as a 2018 investigative series, in partnership with The Guardian, on what the media get wrong in coverage of white supremacists.

OTM's ongoing "Breaking News Consumer's Handbook" series advises the public on how to tell good reporting from bad during the early hours and days of coverage of "a big, tragic story", such as coverage of hurricanes.

== History ==
On the Media first aired February 7, 1993, on WNYC as a local call-in show, initially hosted by Brian Lehrer, then Warren Levinson, and later by Alex S. Jones. During its early episodes it was called Inside Media, but the title was changed to avoid confusion with a same-named trade publication. In 1997, the show went national in a magazine-style format, hosted by Brian Lehrer. During this period, On the Media was under-resourced, Lehrer had commitments stemming from his own daily show, and On the Media did not have an editor.

In late 2000, Gladstone was brought in by WNYC's director of programming to rethink and relaunch the show. The newly formatted OTM debuted in January 2001, co-hosted by Gladstone and Bob Garfield. In May 2021, WNYC dismissed Garfield over alleged repeated violations of WNYC's anti-bullying policy. Gladstone continued as the show's sole host. In July 2024, longtime OTM producer Micah Loewinger was named Gladstone's co-host.

Since 2005, the program has also been available as a podcast.

The show was distributed by NPR until 2015, when WNYC began self-distributing the show.

OTM also publishes a weekly newsletter featuring news on current and past projects, as well as relevant links from around the web.

As of late 2022, the show reaches about 1.2 weekly million listeners across the United States.

As of March 2024, the show's website cited more than 300 public radio stations broadcasting the show.

== Awards ==
=== Peabody Awards ===
A 2023 Peabody award was given to On the Media for its series "The Divided Dial", which charted the growth of and influence of the broadcasting company Salem Media Group and its impact on far-right politics.

A 2004 Peabody Award for excellence went to On the Media with the judges writing, "On the Media reminds us that the messenger is always part of the message and must be examined as such".

=== Gracie Award ===
In 2017, producer Meara Sharma was awarded a Gracie Award for her production of the episode "Kidnapped", a special hour on how people around the world get news from Syria.

=== Edward R. Murrow award ===
In 2003, the show won the Edward R. Murrow Award for investigative reporting.

=== Mirror awards ===
In 2014 and again in 2015, On the Media won Best Single Story—Radio, Television, Cable or Online Broadcast Media at the Mirror Awards.

=== Other awards ===
In 2016, On the Media was awarded the Silver Gavel Award by the American Bar Association for its episode "Bench Press".

In 2012 and again in 2013, On the Media won the Bart Richards Award for Media Criticism.

The show was the 2003 winner of the National Press Club's Arthur Rowse Award for Press Criticism.

== See also ==
- Media literacy
- The Media Project
