= Evelyn Young (saxophonist) =

American saxophonist

Evelyn "The Whip" Young (March 25, 1928 – October 2, 1990) was an American saxophonist from Memphis, Tennessee, United States.

== Career ==
At age 14, Young began playing saxophone professionally at Beale Street Chitlin' Circuit clubs run by Sunbeam Mitchell, while still enrolled at Manassas High School. In 1952, she formed a touring band with Bill Harvey for B.B. King in 1952, which lasted for eight years. From 1960 onward, she performed regularly at Mitchell's Club Handy, directing a 21-piece band there, and recorded with Little Richard, Bobby "Blue" Bland, Little Milton, Memphis Slim, and the Fieldstones.

== Influence ==
Terry Johnson of the Stax session band the Mar-Keys recalls sneaking into Club Handy to hear Young play. In the documentary All Day and All Night: Memories from Beale Street Musicians, Young recalls B.B. King telling her that "everything I played on the saxophone was what he wanted to play on the guitar."

After her death, Fred Ford wrote that "She was as fine a musician as you'll ever hear . . . She never got the recognition she deserved in her lifetime, but she could sure play with anyone."

== Selected recordings ==
- Rufus Thomas, "I'll Be a Good Boy" (1950)
- B.B. King, "3 O'Clock Blues" (1952)
